= Küstriner Bach =

River in Germany

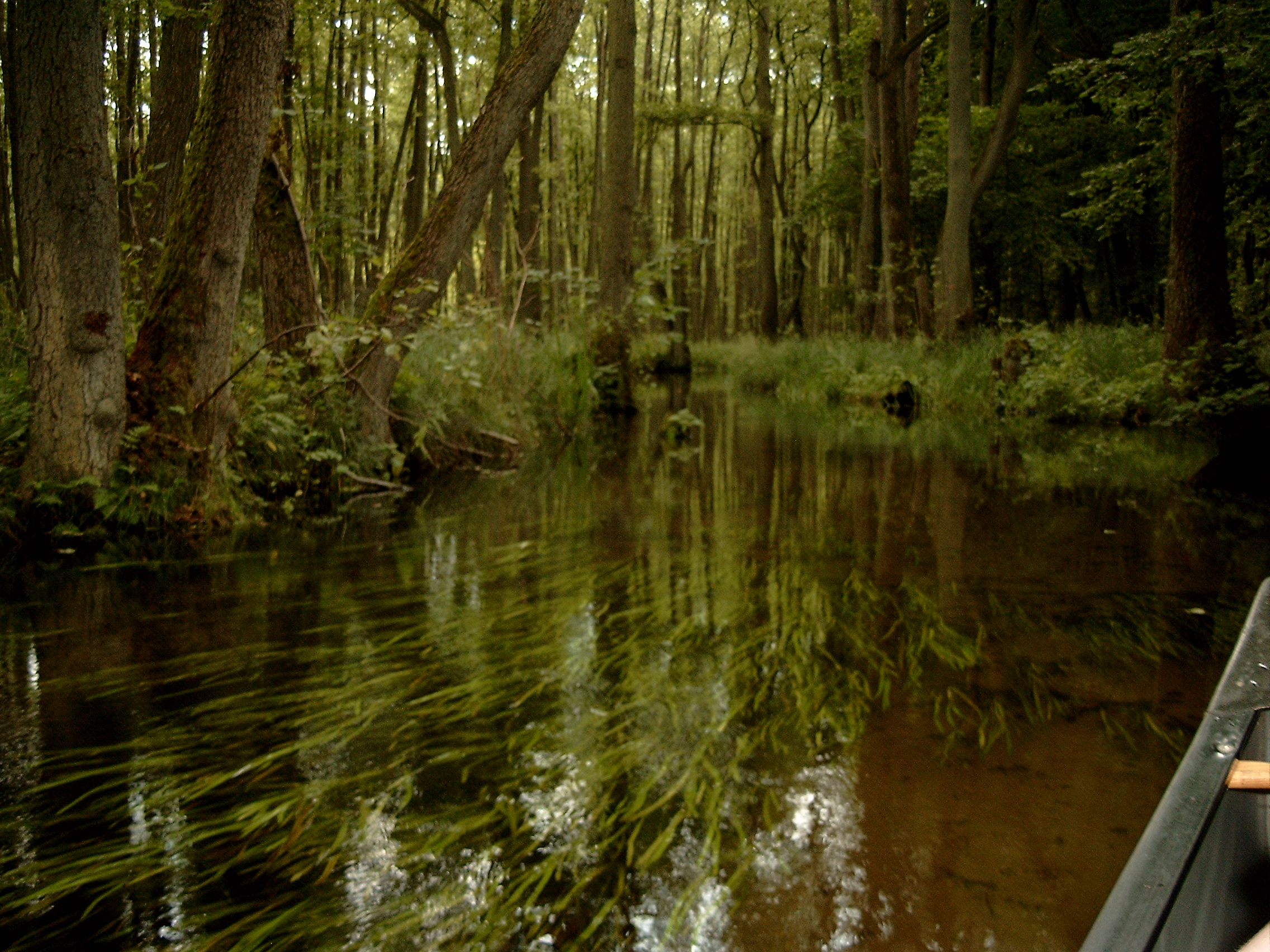

Location
- Country: Germany
- State: Brandenburg

Physical characteristics
- Source: Großer Küstriner
- Mouth
  - location: Oberpfuhl
  - coordinates: 53.2165°N 13.3290°E

Basin features
- Progression: Woblitz→ Havel→ Elbe→ North Sea

Küstriner Bach is a river of Brandenburg, Germany. It flows into the Oberpfuhl, which is drained by the Woblitz, near Lychen. It does not take its name from the town Küstrin (Kostrzyn nad Odrą) but from the village Küstrinchen and the Großer Küstriner See, both near Lychen.

== See also ==
- List of rivers of Brandenburg
