= Blumner =

Blumner is a surname. Notable people with this surname include:

- Hugo Blümner (1844–1919), German classical archaeologist
- Martin Blumner (1826–1893), German composer
- Robyn Blumner (born 1961), American attorney and civil rights expert
