= Röblinsee =

Lake in Germany

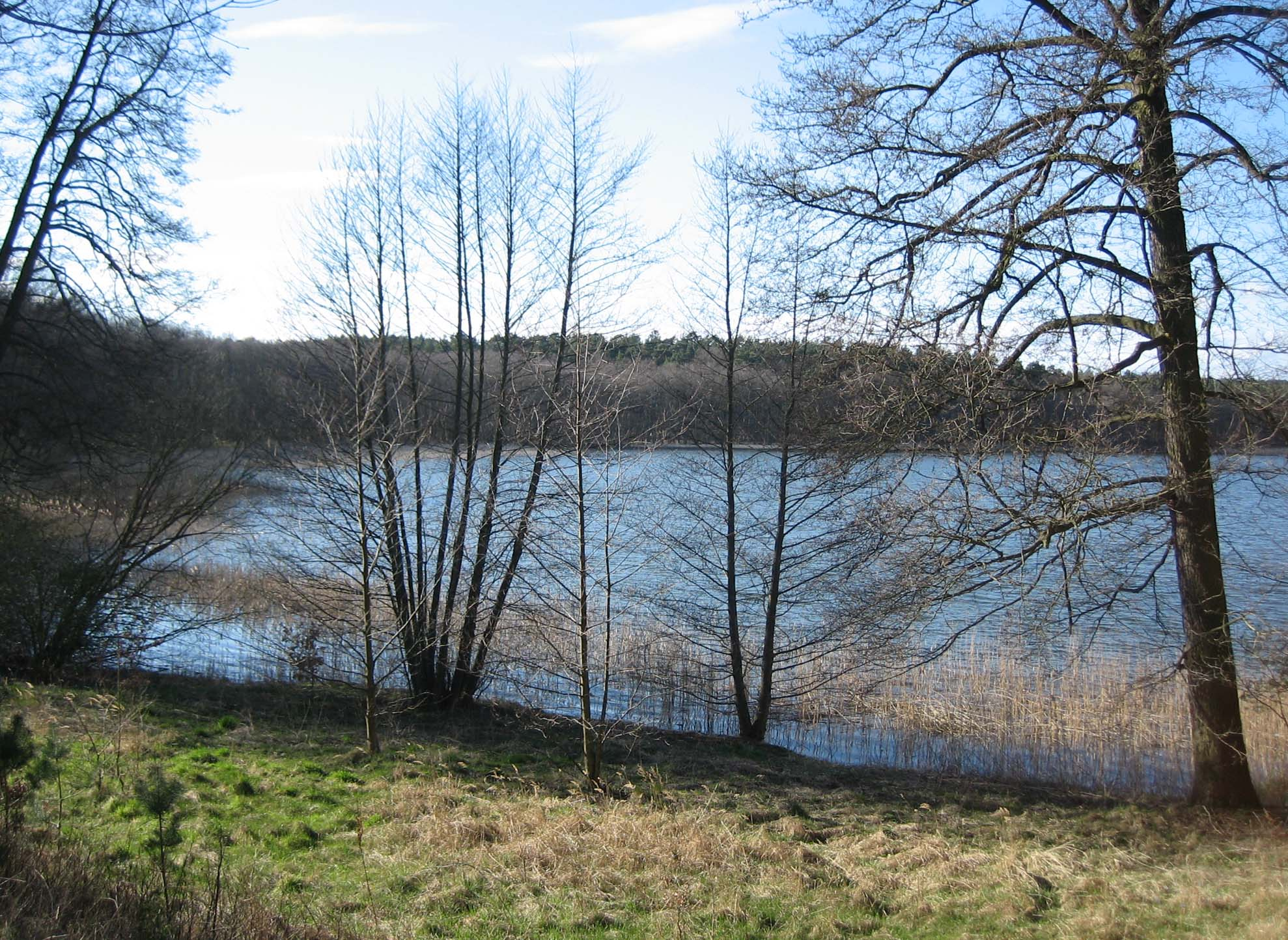
- West bank of the Röblinsee

- Location within Brandenburg
- Location: Oberhavel, Brandenburg
- Coordinates: 53.18711°N 13.116646°E
- Primary inflows: River Havel
- Primary outflows: River Havel
- Basin countries: Germany
- Max. length: 2 km (1.2 mi)
- Max. width: 0.5 km (0.31 mi)

Röblinsee is a lake in the Mecklenburg Lake District, in Germany. It is situated in the district of Oberhavel in the state of Brandenburg, and lies immediately to the west of the town of Fürstenberg. The lake has an east–west orientation, and is about 2 kilometres (1.2 mi) long and up to 0.5 kilometres (0.31 mi) wide.

The navigable River Havel flows through the Röblinsee, entering it via a 5.4 kilometres (3.4 mi) channel from the Ziernsee. The river exits the lake through a short channel and lock in the centre of Fürstenberg, before entering the linked lakes of Baalensee and Schwedtsee. Navigation is administered as part of the Obere–Havel–Wasserstraße.
