= Woblitz =

River in Germany

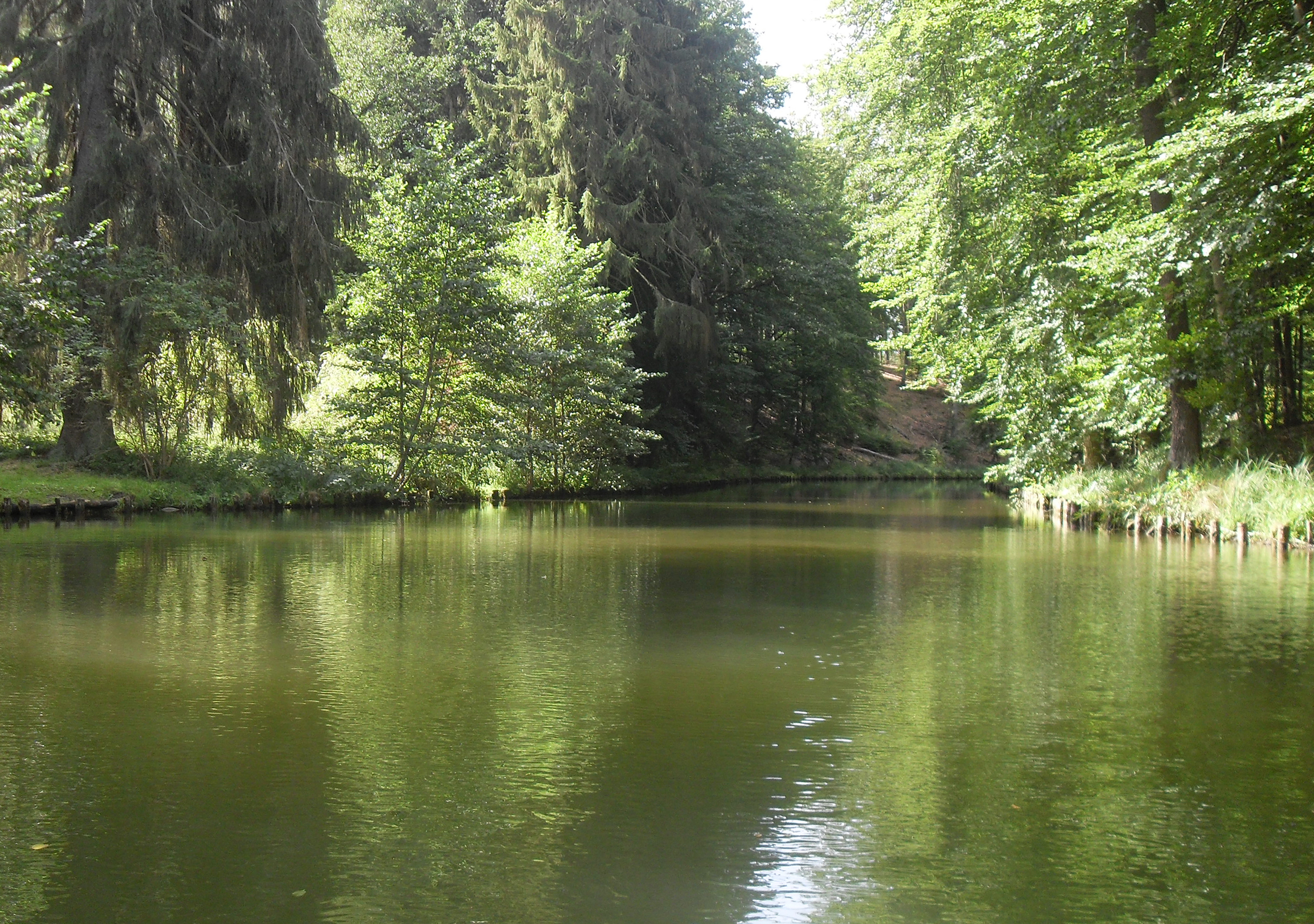

Location
- Country: Germany
- State: Brandenburg

Physical characteristics
- Mouth
  - location: Stolpsee
  - coordinates: 53.1750°N 13.2293°E

Basin features
- Progression: Havel→ Elbe→ North Sea

Woblitz is a river of Brandenburg, Germany. It flows into the Stolpsee, which is drained by the Havel, in Himmelpfort.

== See also ==
- List of rivers of Brandenburg
