= Fürstenberg/Havel =

Fürstenberg
- Town
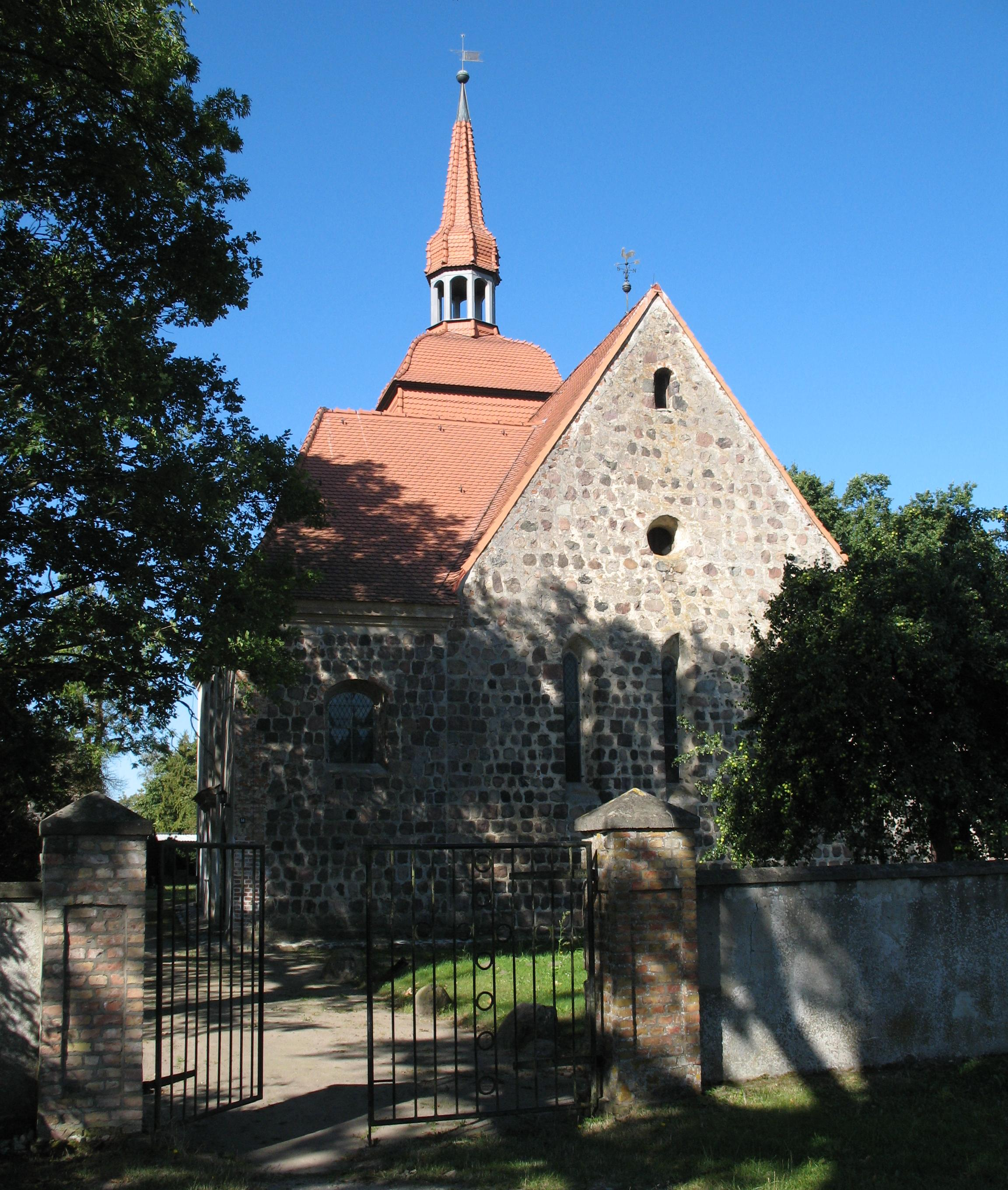
- Church in Blumenow

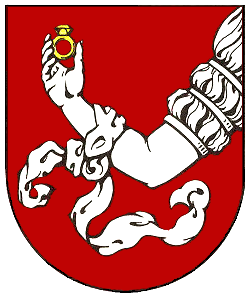
- Coat of arms

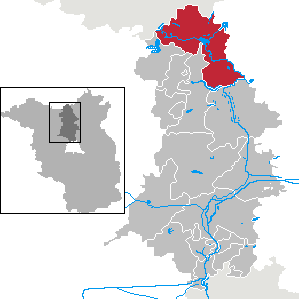
- Location of Fürstenberg within Oberhavel district
- Interactive map of Fürstenberg
- Location within Germany Location within Brandenburg
- Coordinates: 53°11′07″N 13°08′44″E
- Country: Germany
- State: Brandenburg
- District: Oberhavel
- Subdivisions: 10 districts

Government
  - Mayor (2019–27): Robert Philipp (Ind.)

Area
  - Total: 213.85 km^{2} (82.57 sq mi)
- Elevation: 53 m (174 ft)

Population (2025-12-31)
  - Total: 5,715
  - Density: 26.72/km^{2} (69.22/sq mi)
- Time zone: UTC+01:00 (CET)
  - Summer (DST): UTC+02:00 (CEST)
- Postal codes: 16798
- Dialling codes: 033093
- Vehicle registration: OHV
- Website: www.fuerstenberg-havel.de

Fürstenberg (German pronunciation: [ˈfʏʁstn̩ˌbɛʁk]) is a town in the Oberhavel district, Brandenburg, Germany.

== Geography ==
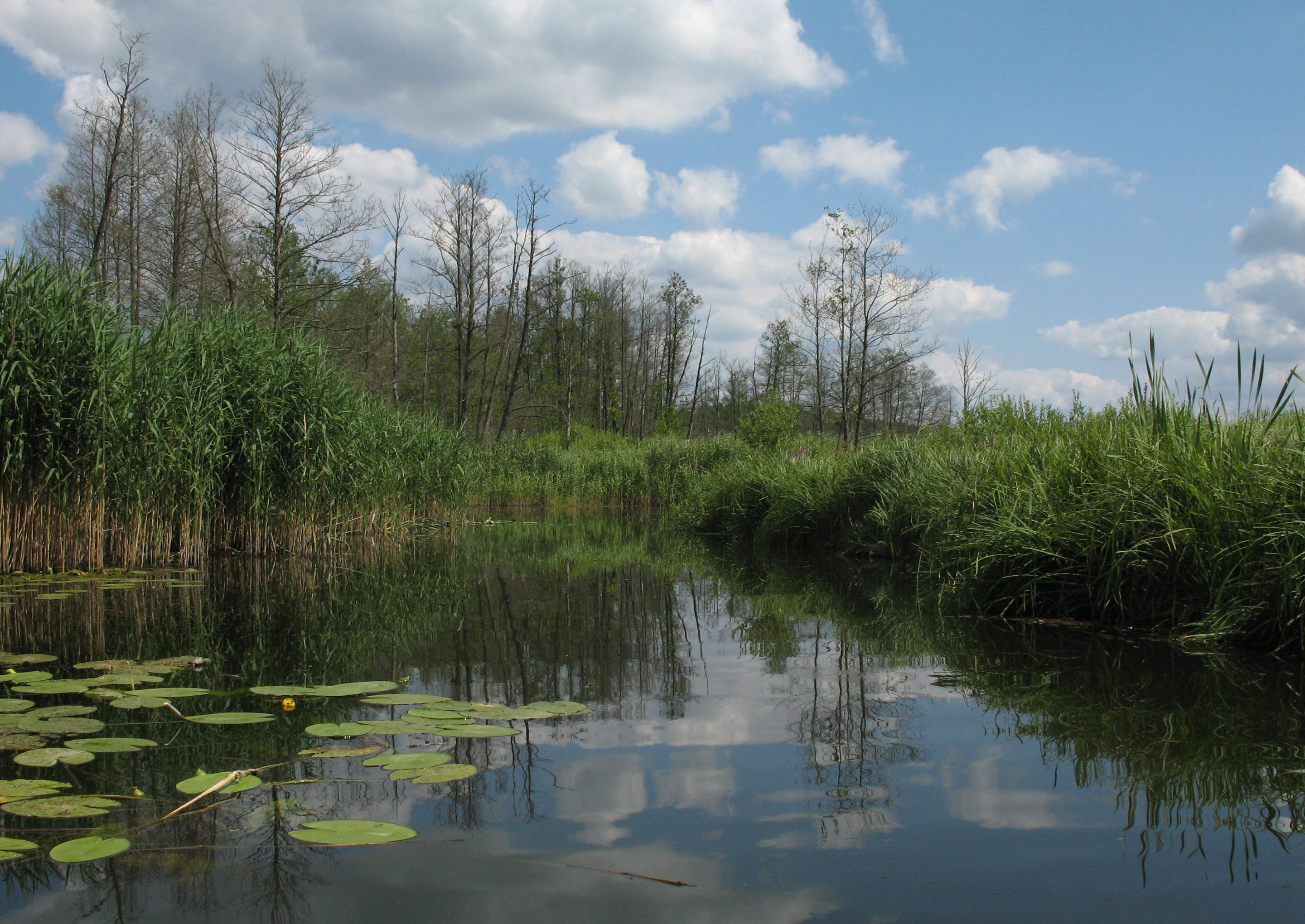
Stream near Tornow

Fürstenberg is situated on the River Havel, 21 kilometres (13 mi) south of Neustrelitz, and 75 kilometres (47 mi) north of Berlin.

The town lies at the southern edge of the Mecklenburg Lake District and is framed by the Röblinsee, Baalensee, and Schwedtsee lakes. The River Havel splits into several channels as it flows through the town, one of which contains a lock used by vessels navigating the river. The original town site was situated on an island between these channels.

=== Districts of Fürstenberg ===
Fürstenberg includes nine areas, named for former villages that are now mostly farmland or little more than a church:

- Altthymen
- Barsdorf
- Blumenow
- Bredereiche
- Himmelpfort
- Steinförde
- Ravensbrück
- Tornow
- Zootzen

== Fürstenberg Palace ==
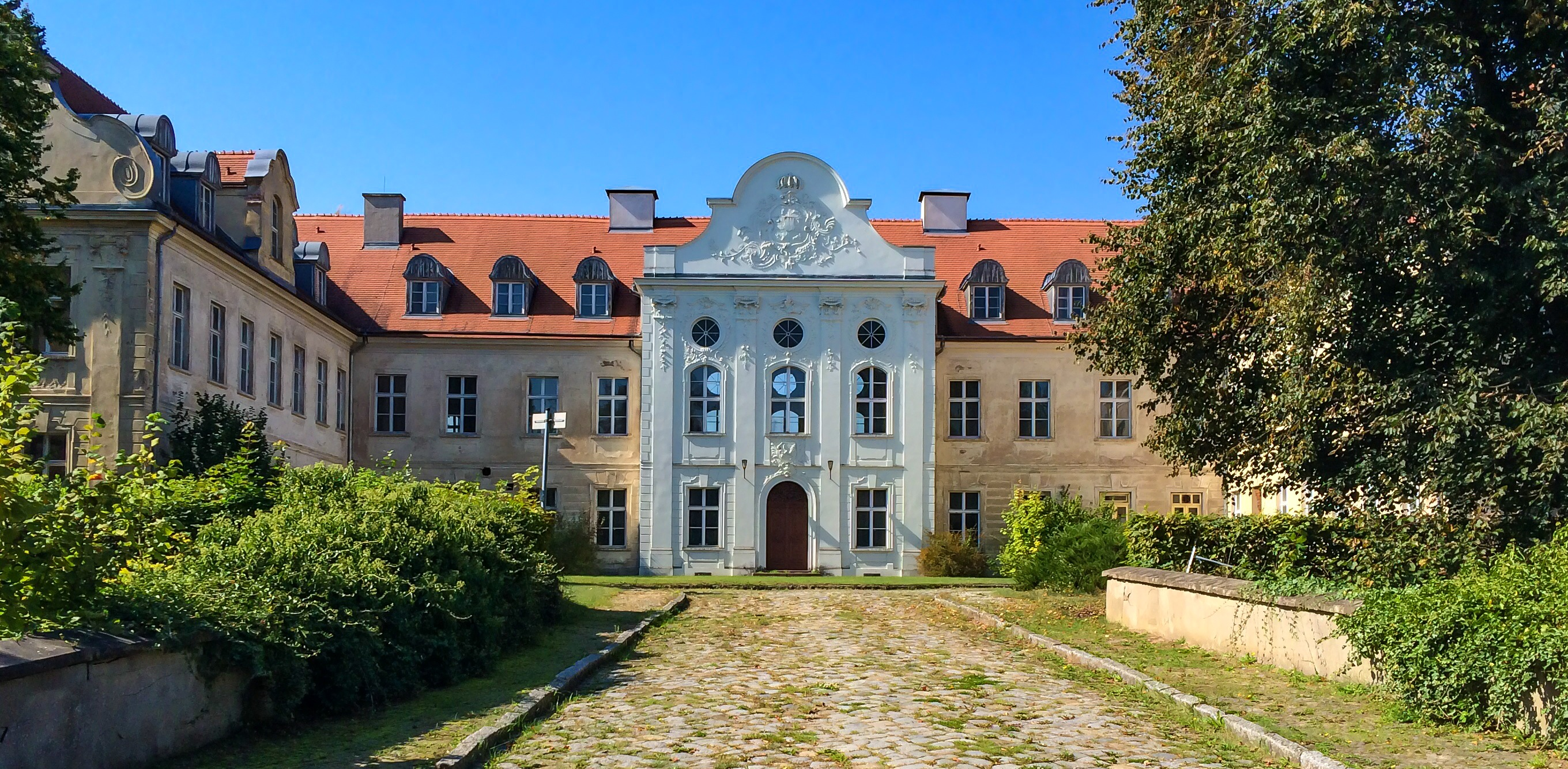
Fürstenberg Palace

North from the center of the town is Fürstenberg Palace, which was built between 1741 and 1752 by the architect Christoph Julius Löwe for Dorothea Sophie of Mecklenburg-Strelitz, the wife of Adolphus Frederick III, the Duke of Mecklenburg-Strelitz. In World War I and World War II, the palace was used as a hospital.

=== History ===
In 1701, Fürstenberg became a part of the Duchy of Mecklenburg-Strelitz, which in 1815 became the Grand Duchy of Mecklenburg-Strelitz and in 1918 the Free State of Mecklenburg-Strelitz. From 1933 to 1945, Fürstenberg was part of Mecklenburg and from 1945 to 1952 of Mecklenburg-Vorpommern. From 1952 to 1990, the town was part of the East German Bezirk Potsdam. Since German reunification in 1990, it has been part of Brandenburg.

In 1758 during the Seven Years' War, the Battle of Tornow was fought near the town between the forces of Prussia and Sweden.

In the Nazi era, Fürstenberg was the site of Ravensbrück concentration camp. Today, the site is a memorial.

Overrun by the Soviet Army in 1945, post-World War II the Red Army established the base of the 2nd Guards Tank Army of the Soviet Forces in Germany in Fürstenberg. In early 1959, three years before the Cuban Missile Crisis, the site was equipped with six R-5 Pobeda nuclear missiles, capable of launching from a mobile launcher from one of four tennis-court-sized sites capable of handling the larger R-12 Dvina. Similar sites were set up at Vogelsang, Zehdenick and Lychen (1xpad). After the withdrawal of the missiles in September 1959, the site returned to its original purpose as an army base.

From 1966, the 3rd Guards Spetsnaz Brigade, also known as military unit 83149, was the only GRU-Spetsnaz unit located outside the Soviet Union. It had a mission of missile destruction behind enemy lines and was located at 53°12′24″N 13°12′14″E near Fürstenberg/Havel, with another unit at Neustrelitz until 1975, then at Neuthymen. The 3rd Guards Spetnaz Brigade was withdrawn in April 1991 to the village of Roshchinsky, Samara Oblast under the command of the Volga-Urals Military District. Since November 2010, the unit has been under the Central Military District and is co-located with the headquarters of the Avtozavedsky Military Commissariat at the former site of the Togliatti Military Technical Institute (TVTI) (Russian: Толья́ттинский вое́нный техни́ческий институ́т (ТВТИ)) in Tolyatti which is the location of AvtoVAZ. (Note: The 3rd Guards Spetsnaz Brigade (military unit 83149) included 501st Separate Special Forces Detachment; 503rd Separate Special Forces Detachment (military unit 21209); 509th Separate Special Forces Detachment (military unit 21353); 510th Separate Special Forces Detachment; 512th Separate Special Forces Detachment.)

After the restructuring of the federal states (German Länder) following the end of the GDR in 1990, Fürstenberg was again attached to the state of Brandenburg. From 1993, the town became part of the newly formed district of Oberhavel. Russian Army troops were withdrawn from their former East German bases in 1994.

== Demography ==
Development of population since 1875 within the current boundaries (blue line: population; dotted line: comparison with population development of Brandenburg state)

Recent population development (blue line) and forecasts

Fürstenberg/Havel: Population development
within the current boundaries

Year	Pop.	±% p.a.
1875	4,896	—
1890	5,389	+0.64%
1910	5,780	+0.35%
1925	7,710	+1.94%
1933	8,799	+1.67%
1939	9,510	+1.30%
1946	12,557	+4.05%
1950	12,796	+0.47%
1964	10,041	−1.72%
1971	9,621	−0.61%
1981	8,545	−1.18%
1985	8,311	−0.69%
1989	7,990	−0.98%
1990	7,860	−1.63%
1991	7,716	−1.83%

Year	Pop.	±% p.a.
1992	7,654	−0.80%
1993	7,647	−0.09%
1994	7,607	−0.52%
1995	7,630	+0.30%
1996	7,531	−1.30%
1997	7,473	−0.77%
1998	7,403	−0.94%
1999	7,348	−0.74%
2000	7,220	−1.74%
2001	7,117	−1.43%
2002	6,966	−2.12%
2003	6,870	−1.38%
2004	6,792	−1.14%
2005	6,716	−1.12%
2006	6,623	−1.38%

Year	Pop.	±% p.a.
2007	6,517	−1.60%
2008	6,442	−1.15%
2009	6,356	−1.33%
2010	6,257	−1.56%
2011	6,054	−3.24%
2012	5,972	−1.35%
2013	5,959	−0.22%
2014	5,882	−1.29%
2015	5,854	−0.48%
2016	5,874	+0.34%
2017	5,846	−0.48%
2018	5,838	−0.14%
2019	5,827	−0.19%
2020	5,782	−0.77%

== Transportation ==
The town lies on the Berlin-Stralsund railway. The railway station is called Fürstenberg (Havel) and is serviced by DB Regio Nordost. The web site or vending machines of Verkehrsverbund Berlin-Brandenburg may be used to buy tickets.

Federal Highway Bundesstraße 96 passes through the town.

== Notable residents ==
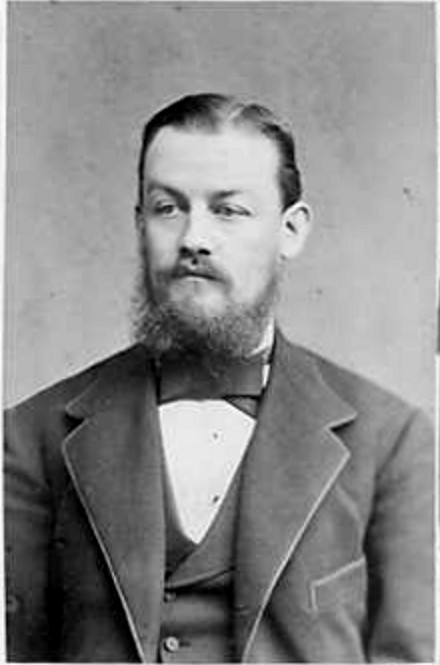
Martin Blumner (early photograph)

- Martin Blumner (1827-1901), composer, conductor and musical theorist
- Walter Bartel (1904-1992), resistance fighter and historian
- Elsa Ehrich (1914–1948), Nazi SS concentration camp guard executed for war crimes
- Daniel Domscheit-Berg (1978–), technology activist.

== Connected to Fürstenberg ==
- Heinrich Schliemann (1822-1890), archaeologist, 1836-1841 Apprentice in Fürstenberg
- Otto Hammann (1852-1928), lawyer and journalist, died in Fürstenberg
- Oskar Minkowski (1858-1931), physician, died in Fürstenberg
- Semyon Konstantinovich Kurkotkin (1917-1990), Marshal of the Soviet Union, commander of the 2. Armored Army in Fürstenberg
- Daniel Domscheit-Berg (born 1978), former speaker of the Unveiling Platform WikiLeaks, lives in Fürstenberg

== Gallery ==
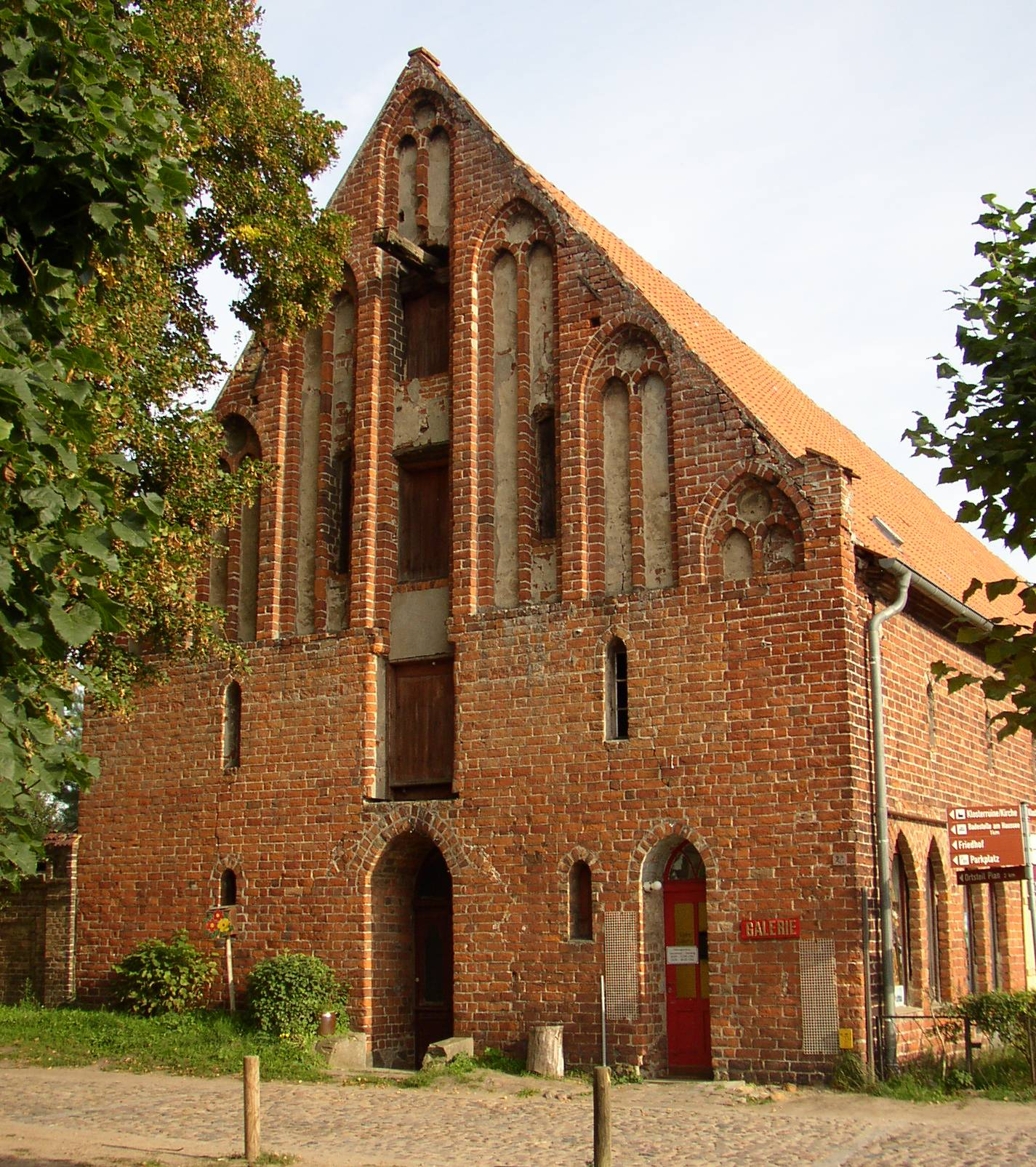
Former brewery in Himmelpfort

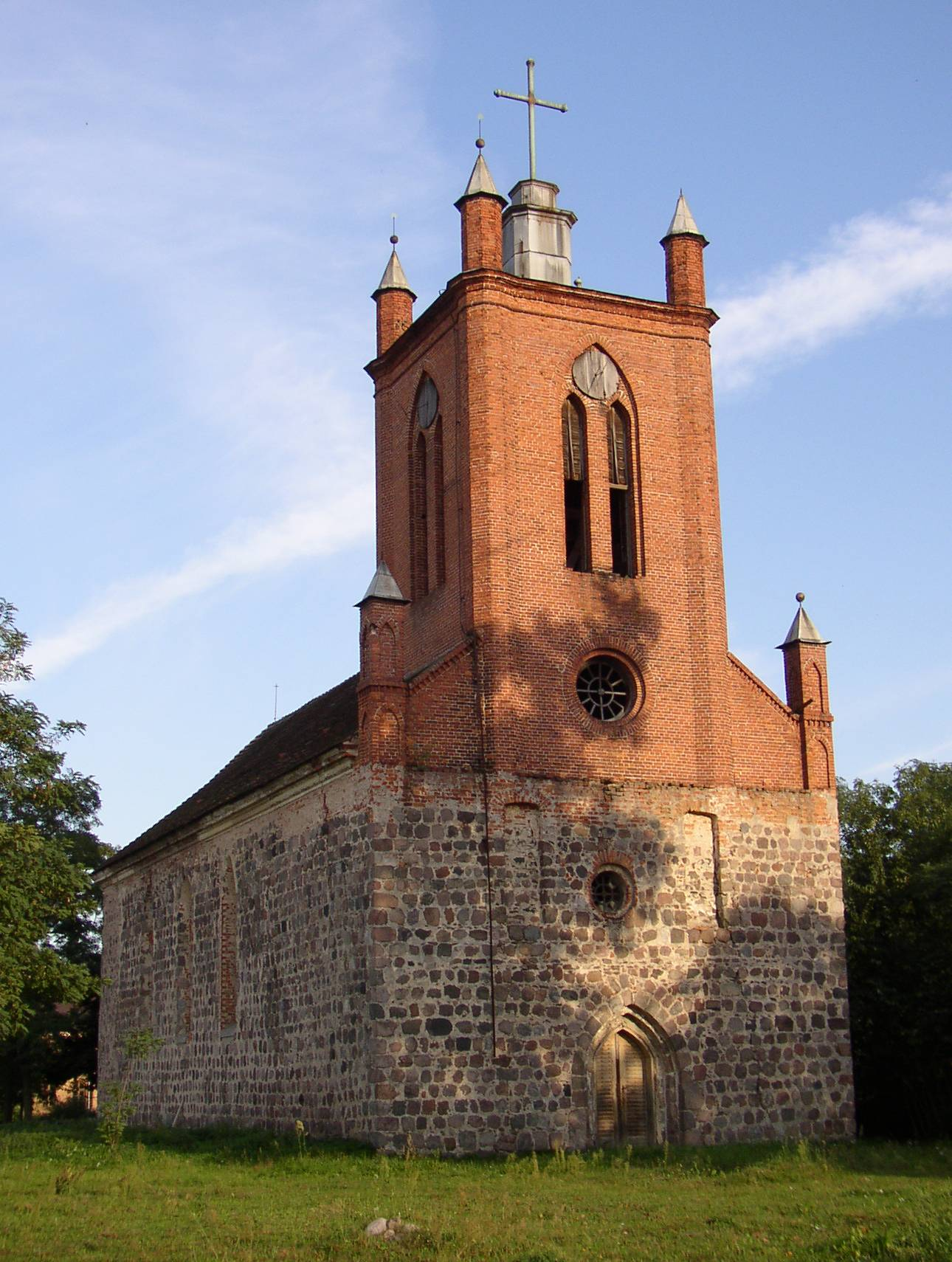
Church in Tornow

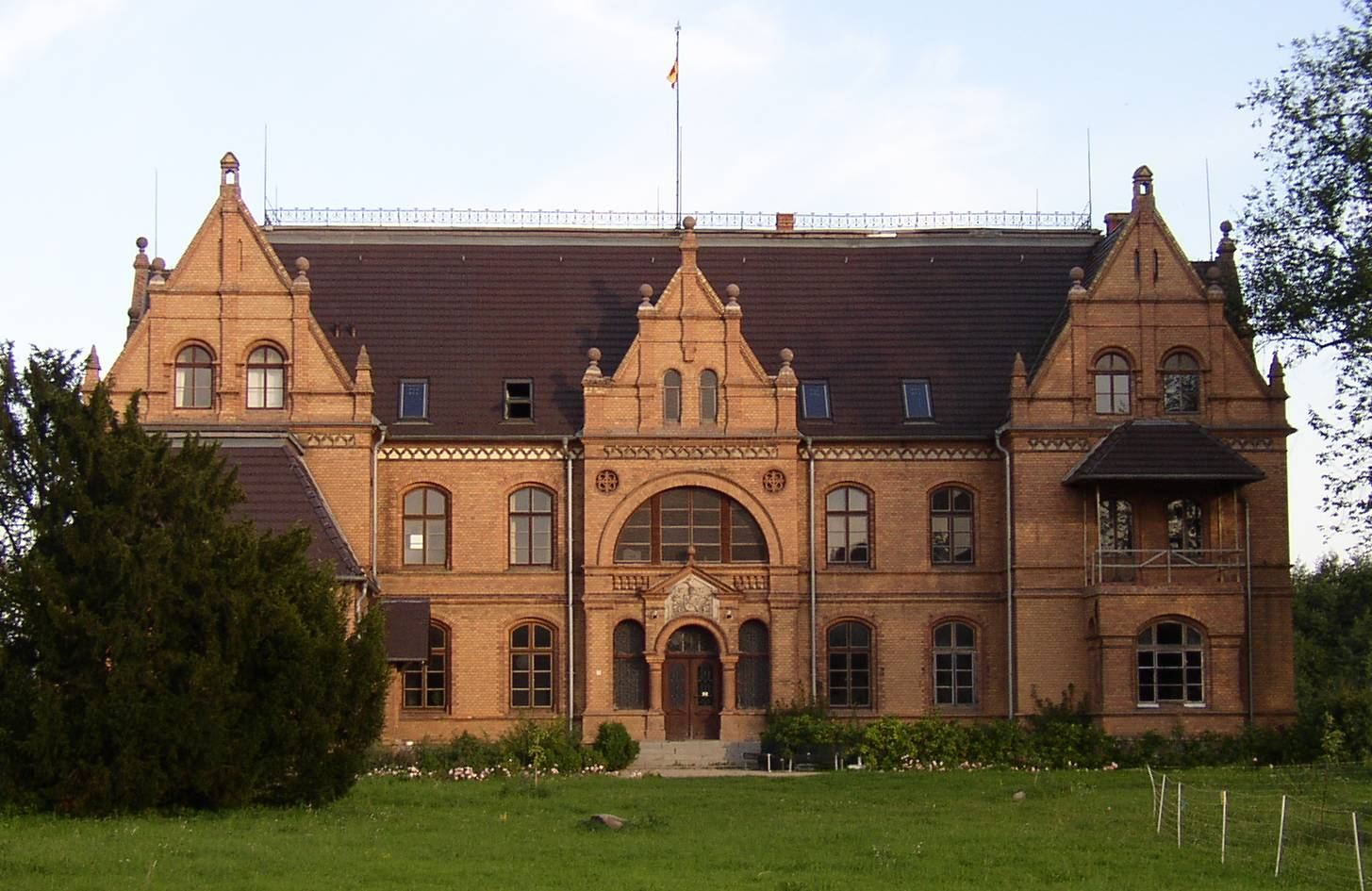
Castle in Tornow
