= Havel–Oder–Wasserstraße =

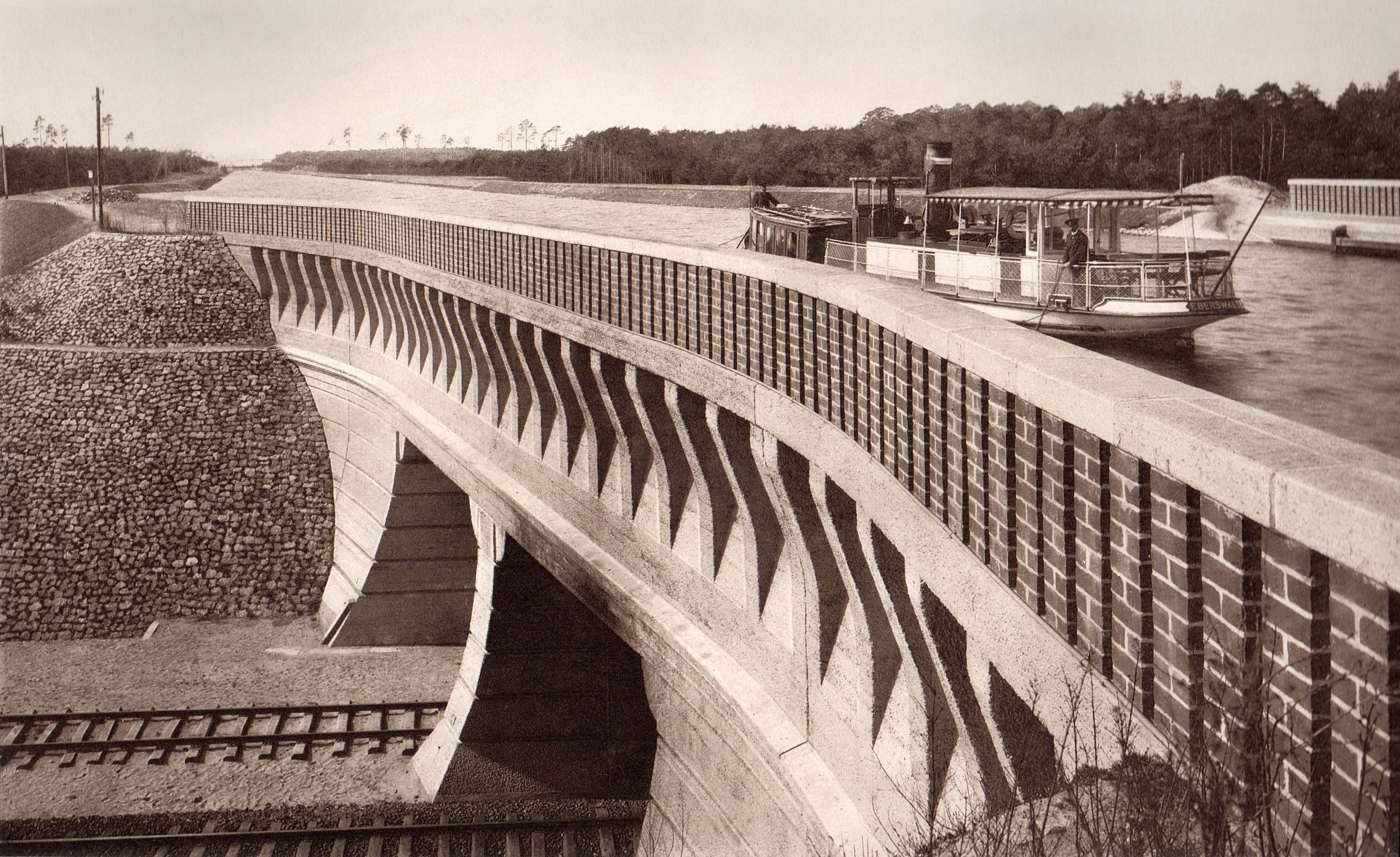
Havel-Oder-Wasserstraße - Eberswalder Kanalbrücke 1

The Havel–Oder–Wasserstraße (HOW) is a navigable waterway connecting Berlin (Havel and Spree) and the German-Polish border at the West Oder River at Friedrichsthal north of Schwedt. Approximately 135 km long, it is composed of the following sections:

- Havel-, Scheital-, Oderhaltung and the Hohensaaten-Friedrichsthaler Wasserstraße (HFW), which are connected by the Lehnitz lock,
- the ship's lift Niederfinow and
- the West Schleuse Hohensaaten.

The route between the Havel and Lehnitz lock and the peak position are together called Oder-Havel-Kanal for the Oderhaltung (Wriezener Alte Oder) section of the river, also known as the Oderberger Gewässer. The German-Polish border forms part of the west or north Mescherin (enlargement of the total length by about 14 km) and the Berlin-Spandau shipping canal, the Berlin Westhafen on a short route with the Havelhaltung (by Spandau lock above the Spreemündung).

The HOW is a class IV federal waterway with restrictions.
