= Ruppin Switzerland =

Forest region in Brandenburg, Germany

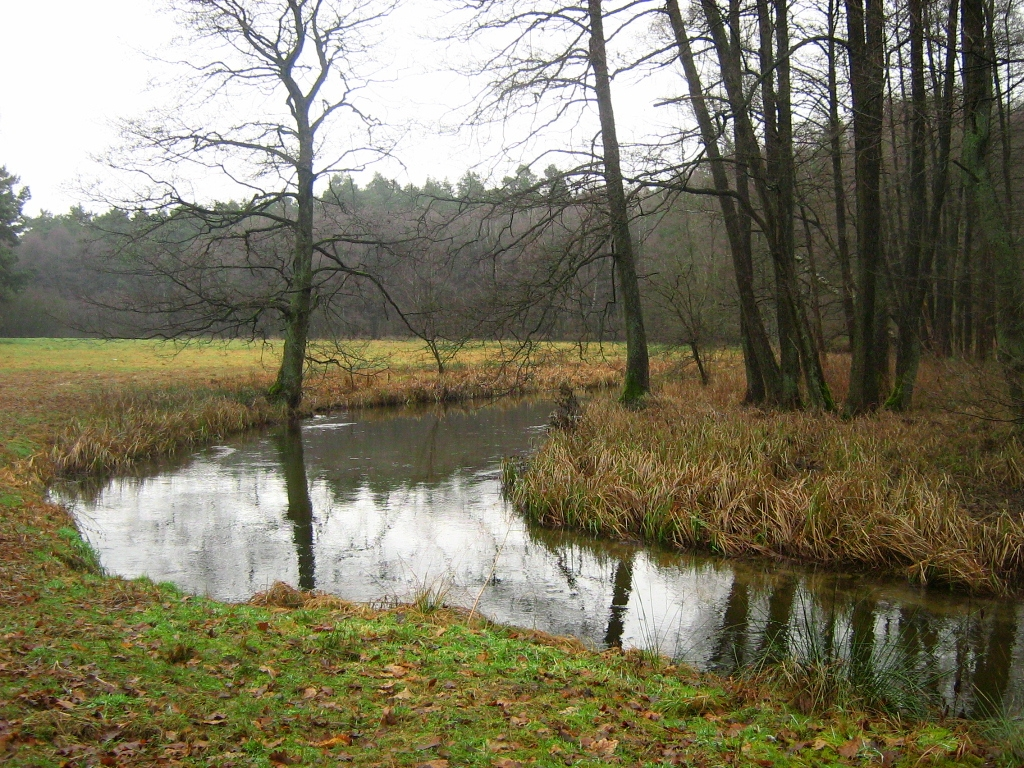
The Rhin in Ruppin Switzerland

Ruppin Switzerland (German: Ruppiner Schweiz) is an elongated hilly forest region in the north of Brandenburg, Germany. To its west is the Kyritz-Ruppin Heath, to the north the Rheinsberg Lake District and to the east the Schorfheide heathland. Ruppin Switzerland lies in a wide belt of terminal moraine and runs from Neuruppin in the south to the village of Binenwalde in the north, the largest part of it being situated in the borough of Neuruppin. The central part of Ruppin Switzerland is the nature reserve of Ruppiner Seenrinne with its chain of lakes: the Kalksee, Binenbach, Tornowsee, Zermützelsee, Tetzensee, Molchowsee and Rhin. This lake sequence starts with the Kalksee and Tornowsee and runs for over 40 kilometres southwards to the upper part of the Rhinluch.

Ruppin Switzerland is part of the Stechlin-Ruppiner Land Nature Park.

Theodor Fontane, the German novelist and poet, walked through Ruppin Switzerland 130 years ago. He recorded his impressions in his Wanderungen durch die Mark Brandenburg ("Walks through the March of Brandenburg").
