= Ziernsee =

Lake in Mecklenburg-Vorpommern, Germany

- Location within Germany
- Location: Mecklenburgische Seenplatte, Mecklenburg-Vorpommern
- Coordinates: 53.208192°N 13.076992°E
- Primary inflows: River Havel
- Primary outflows: River Havel
- Basin countries: Germany
- Surface area: 1.1 square kilometres (0.42 sq mi)
- Surface elevation: 54.6 metres (179 ft)

Ziernsee is a lake in the Mecklenburg Lake District, in Germany. Whilst most of the lake is in the district of Mecklenburgische Seenplatte (municipality Priepert) in the state of Mecklenburg-Vorpommern, a portion of its southern shore is in the state of Brandenburg.

The lake has an elevation of 54.6 metres (179 ft) and a surface area of 1.1 square kilometres (0.42 sq mi).

The navigable River Havel flows through the Ziernsee, entering it via a 0.3-kilometre (0.19 mi) long channel from the Ellbogensee to the west, and exiting via a 5.4-kilometre (3.4 mi) channel to the Röblinsee. Navigation is administered as part of the Obere–Havel–Wasserstraße.
