= Baalensee =

Lake in Brandenburg, Germany

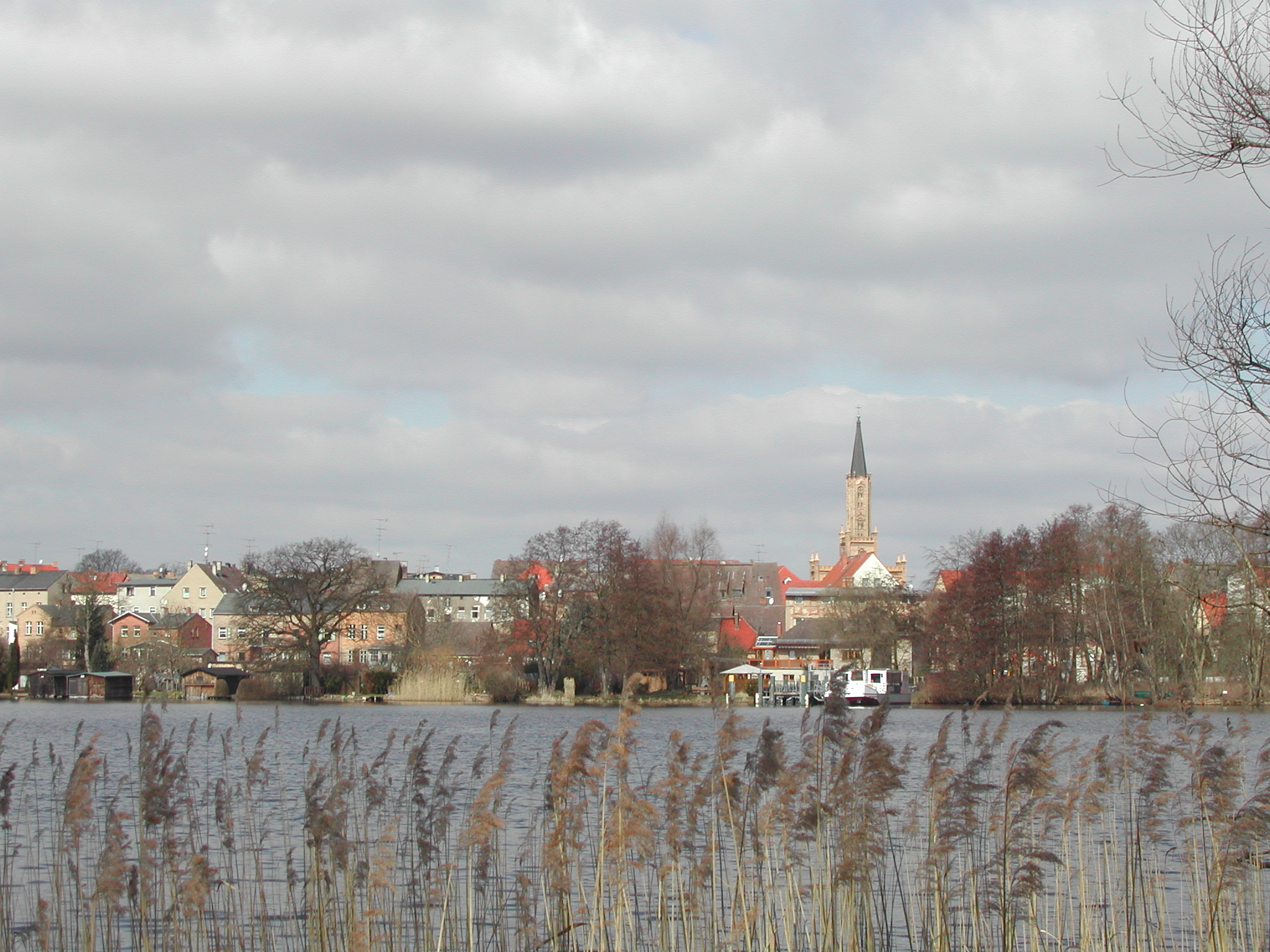
- Baalensee with Fürstenberg in the background

- Location within Brandenburg
- Location: Fürstenberg, Oberhavel, Brandenburg
- Coordinates: 53.181453°N 13.149605°E
- Primary inflows: River Havel
- Primary outflows: River Havel
- Basin countries: Germany

Baalensee is a lake in the Mecklenburg Lake District, in Germany. It is situated in the district of Oberhavel in the state of Brandenburg, and lies immediately to the east of the centre of the town of Fürstenberg.

The navigable River Havel flows through the Baalensee, entering it from the Röblinsee via a short channel and lock in the centre of Fürstenberg, and exiting directly into the adjacent Schwedtsee. Navigation is administered as part of the Obere–Havel–Wasserstraße.
