= Lake Tornow =

Lake in Ruppin Switzerland, Brandenburg

Tornowsee
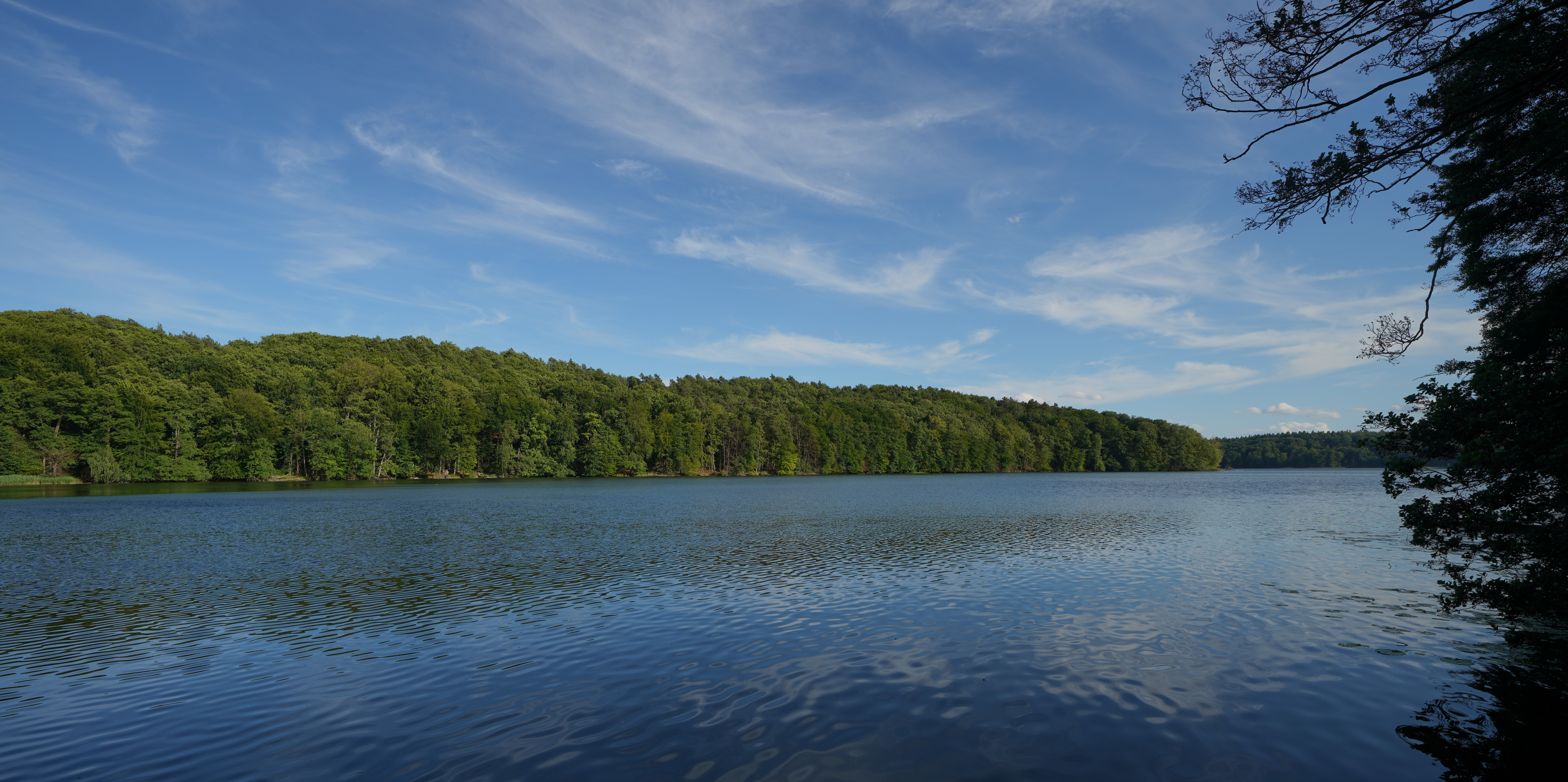
- Lake Tornow

- Location within Brandenburg
- Location: Ruppin Switzerland, Brandenburg
- Coordinates: 53°1′23.52″N 12°48′0″E
- Primary inflows: Kunster, Tornowquelle, Binenbach
- Primary outflows: Rottstielfließ
- Catchment area: 6,546 ha (16,180 acres)
- Basin countries: Germany
- Max. length: 1,570 m (5,150 ft)
- Max. width: 2,180 m (7,150 ft)
- Surface area: 124 ha (310 acres)
- Max. depth: 12 m (39 ft)
- Water volume: 7,526,514 m^{3} (265,796,300 cu ft)
- Surface elevation: 38.4 m (126 ft)

Lake Tornow (German: Tornowsee) is a lake in Ruppin Switzerland in Brandenburg, Germany. It is located east of Kunsterspring and south of Binenwalde and not far from the residential area of Tornow. It lies completely within the municipal boundaries of Neuruppin. The lake is a state waterway. It is 2.18 km (1.35 mi) wide and 1.57 km (0.98 mi) long, with an area of 124 ha (310 acres) and a maximum depth of 12 m (39 ft).

== Interpretation of the name ==
Tornow (Tornov) is a derivation of tarn, Slavic for thorn, thorn bush, i.e. a place where thorn bushes grow. Tornow was first mentioned in 1524, and in 1541 there was a big lake near Tornow. Originally Tornow was a settlement, but after the village became an abandoned field in the Middle Ages, the Tornow forester's house stands there today. The former settlement gave the lake its name.

== Geography ==
The lake is part of the Ruppin Switzerland nature reserve and the Ruppin Switzerland waterway in a glacial channel formed by the Kalksee Lake to the north of the Lake Tornow, the Lake Tornow itself, and to the south of it the Lake Zermützelsee, Lake Tetzensee, Lake Molchowsee, and the Rhin. The chain of lakes stretches for around 40 kilometers south to the upper part of the Rhinluch.

Lake Tornow is bordered to the north and east by the outer terminal moraine of the Frankfurt Phase with heights of about 100 m, and to the west by the associated outwash with heights of up to 60 m. The lake is sunken into its surroundings with a mirror height of about 38 m. It is connected to the Kalksee via the Binenbach, and to the Zermützelsee via the Rottstiel stream.

== Tourism ==
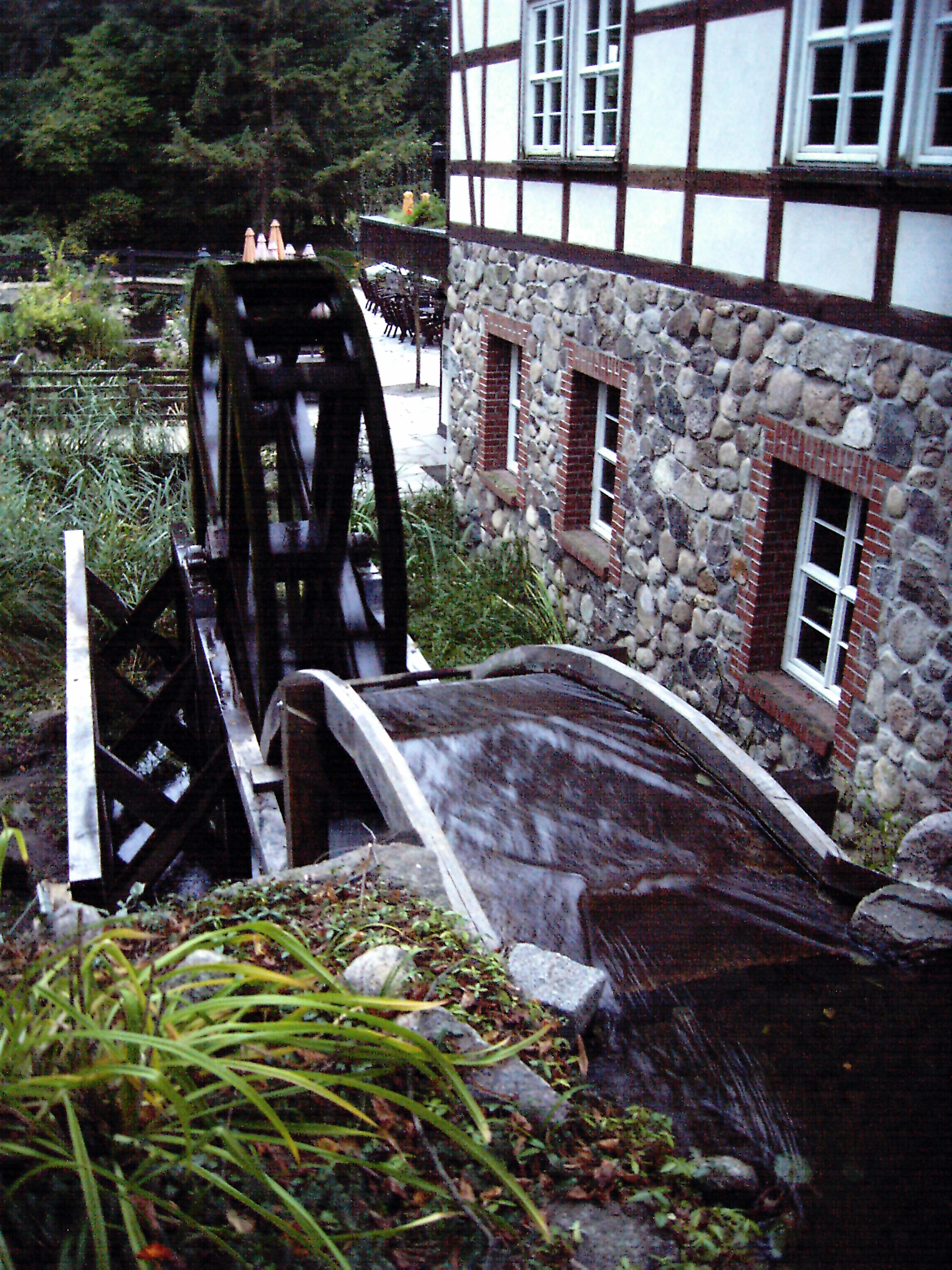
Water wheel of the Bolten mill

The navigable lake is the end of the water trail through the lakes of Ruppin Switzerland and can be navigated by motorboats to a limited extent. The vegetation of old beech trees and wet meadows makes the landscape attractive. There are several swimming spots and a campground at the Rottstiel stream.

Archaeologists found traces of a fortified settlement from the Late Bronze Age on the Weilickenberg near the Bolten mill. The finds from these excavations are kept in the Potsdam Museum of Prehistory and Early History.

== The Fontane hiking trail - a circular route around the lake ==
The Fontane hiking trail circles the lake for about seven kilometers. On the north shore, the Bolten mill can be visited, which was almost completely burned down in 1992. It has been rebuilt as an excursion restaurant. The trail crosses the Tornow source, the Binenbach, and the Rottstiel stream, and passes the Weilickenberg and the Zanderblick viewpoint. The village of Rottstiel and the Kunsterwiese are located along the Fontane hiking trail.

In some places, there are junctions to other hiking destinations such as the Kalksee Lake in the north or the Tornow Forester's Lodge in the south. A blue line marker draws attention here to the European long-distance hiking trail E 10. - After the Rottstiel bridge, the E 10 continues to the forest museum in Stendenitz and in the direction of Neuruppin.
