= Schwedtsee =

Lake in Germany

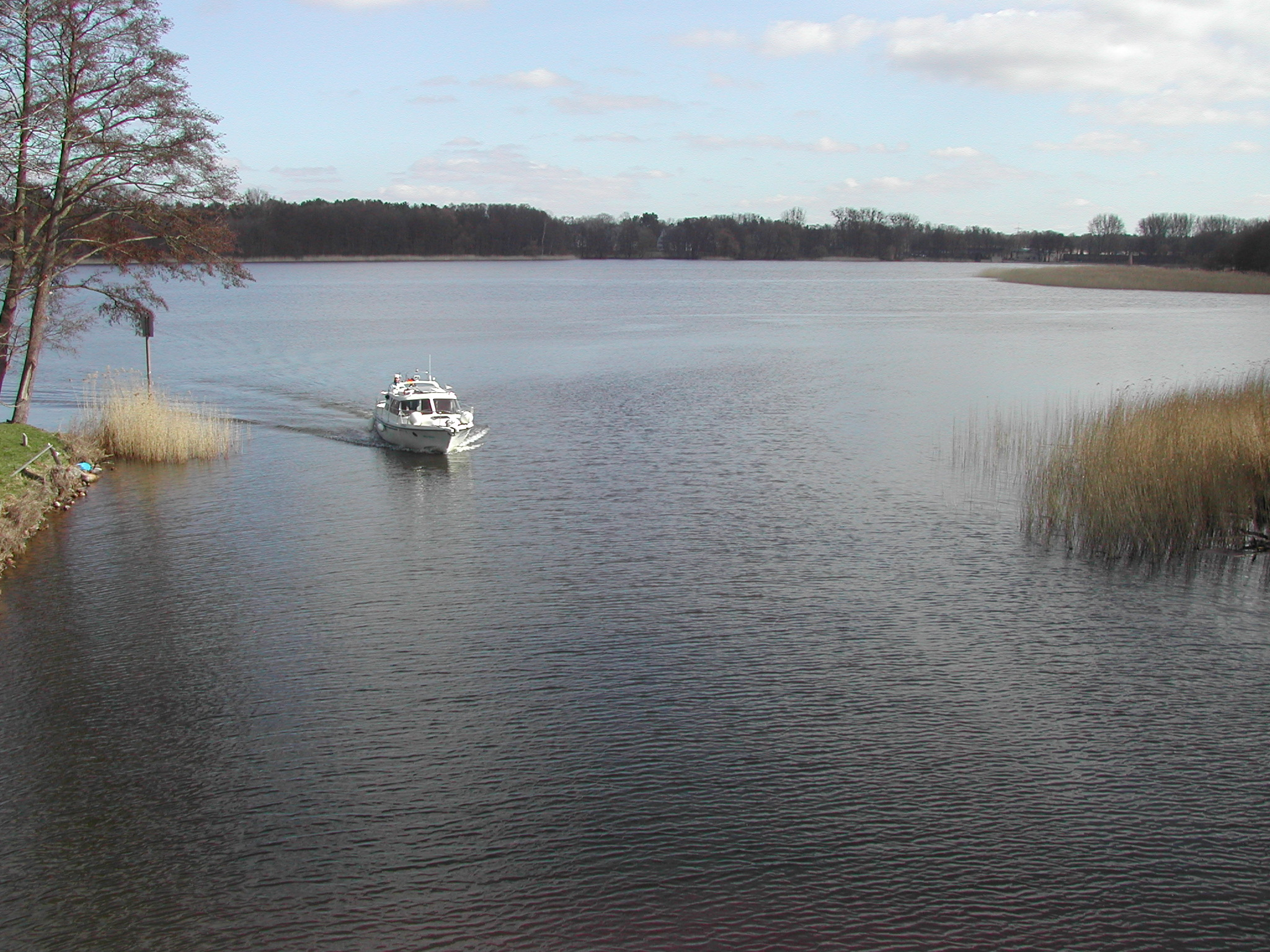

- Location within Brandenburg
- Location: Fürstenberg, Oberhavel, Brandenburg
- Coordinates: 53.188268°N 13.149605°E
- Primary inflows: River Havel
- Primary outflows: River Havel
- Basin countries: Germany
- Surface area: 750,000 m^{2} (8,100,000 ft^{2})
- Max. depth: 3.5 m (11 ft)

Schwedtsee is a lake in the Mecklenburg Lake District, in Germany. It is situated in the district of Oberhavel in the state of Brandenburg, and lies to the east of the centre of the town of Fürstenberg. The site of the Ravensbrück concentration camp was adjacent to the lake, and a memorial is now situated between the lake and the camp site.

The lake has about an area of 750,000 square metres (8,100,000 sq ft) and is up to 3.5 metres (11 ft) deep.

The navigable River Havel flows through the southern section Schwedtsee, entering it directly from the adjacent Baalensee, and exiting it via an adjacent 2.4 kilometres (1.5 mi) channel to the Stolpsee. The lake is navigable to its eastern end, and navigation is administered as part of the Obere–Havel–Wasserstraße.

Germans dumped ashes of cremated prisoners from Ravensbrück into the Schwedtsee lake.
