= Stolpsee =

Lake in Brandenburg, Germany

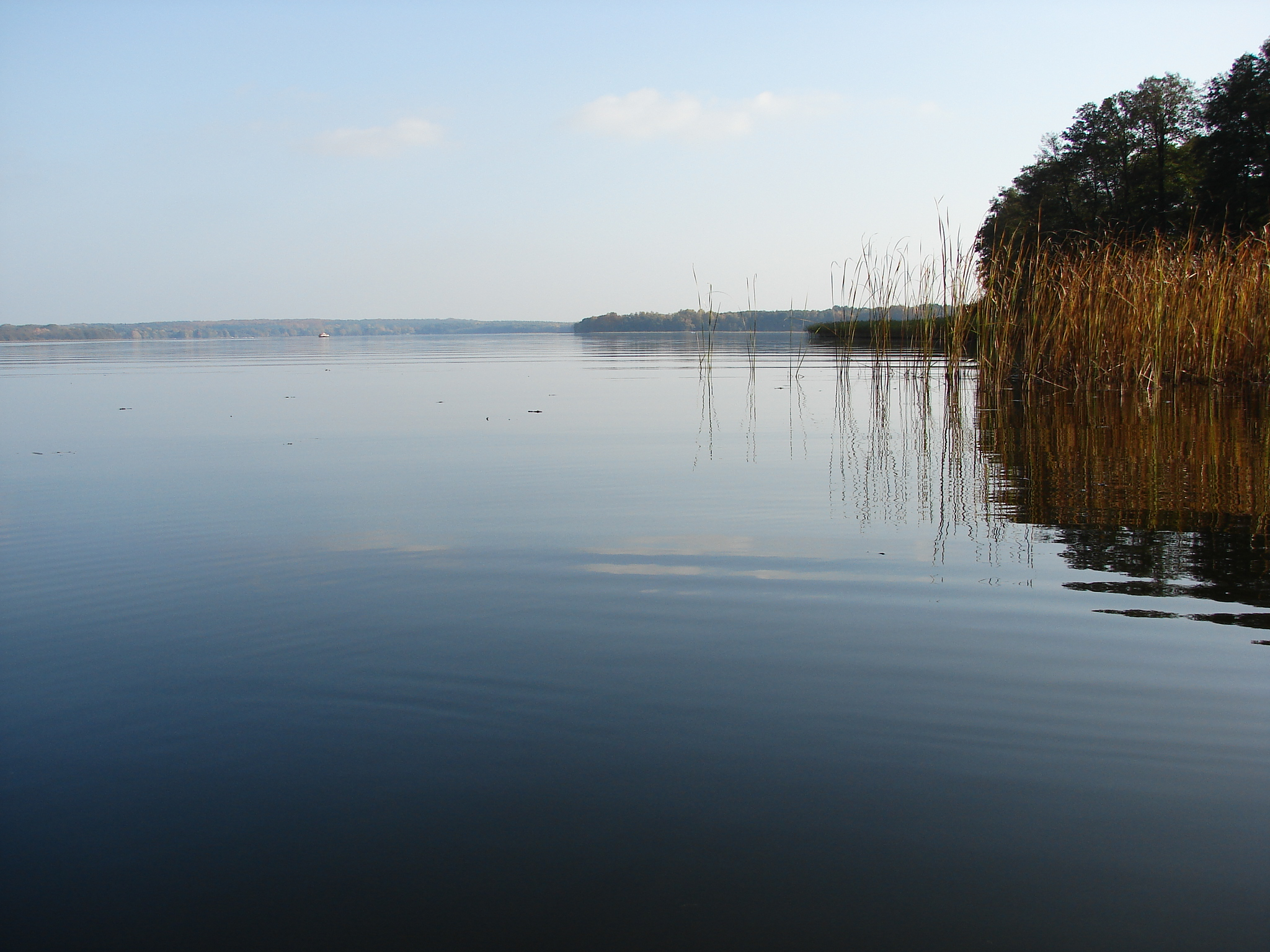
- Stolpsee

- Location within Brandenburg
- Location: Oberhavel, Brandenburg
- Coordinates: 53.174971°N 13.208485°E
- Primary inflows: River Havel
- Primary outflows: River Havel
- Basin countries: Germany
- Max. length: 3.6 km (2.2 mi)
- Max. width: 1.42 km (0.88 mi)
- Surface area: 371 ha (920 acres)
- Surface elevation: 52 m (171 ft)

Stolpsee is a lake in the Mecklenburg Lake District, in Germany. It is situated in the district of Oberhavel in the state of Brandenburg. The resort of Himmelpfort lies on the north bank of the lake.

The lake has an approximate length of 3.6 kilometres (2.2 mi) and a width of 1.42 kilometres (0.88 mi). It has a surface area of 371 hectares (920 acres) and is situated at an altitude of 52 metres (171 ft) above sea level.

The navigable River Havel flows through the lake, entering it via a 2.4 kilometres (1.5 mi) channel from the Schwedtsee. The Stolpsee is the lowest of the chain of lakes within the Mecklenburg Lake District that the river flows through, and on exit the river flows for some 90 kilometres (56 mi) before reaching the next lake, the Tegeler See on the outskirts of Berlin. Navigation is administered as part of the Obere–Havel–Wasserstraße.

The Stolpsee is also linked to the Hausee via a short canal and lock at Himmelpfort, forming the first link of the Lychener Gewässer that provides navigable access to the town of Lychen.
