= Havel =

River in Germany

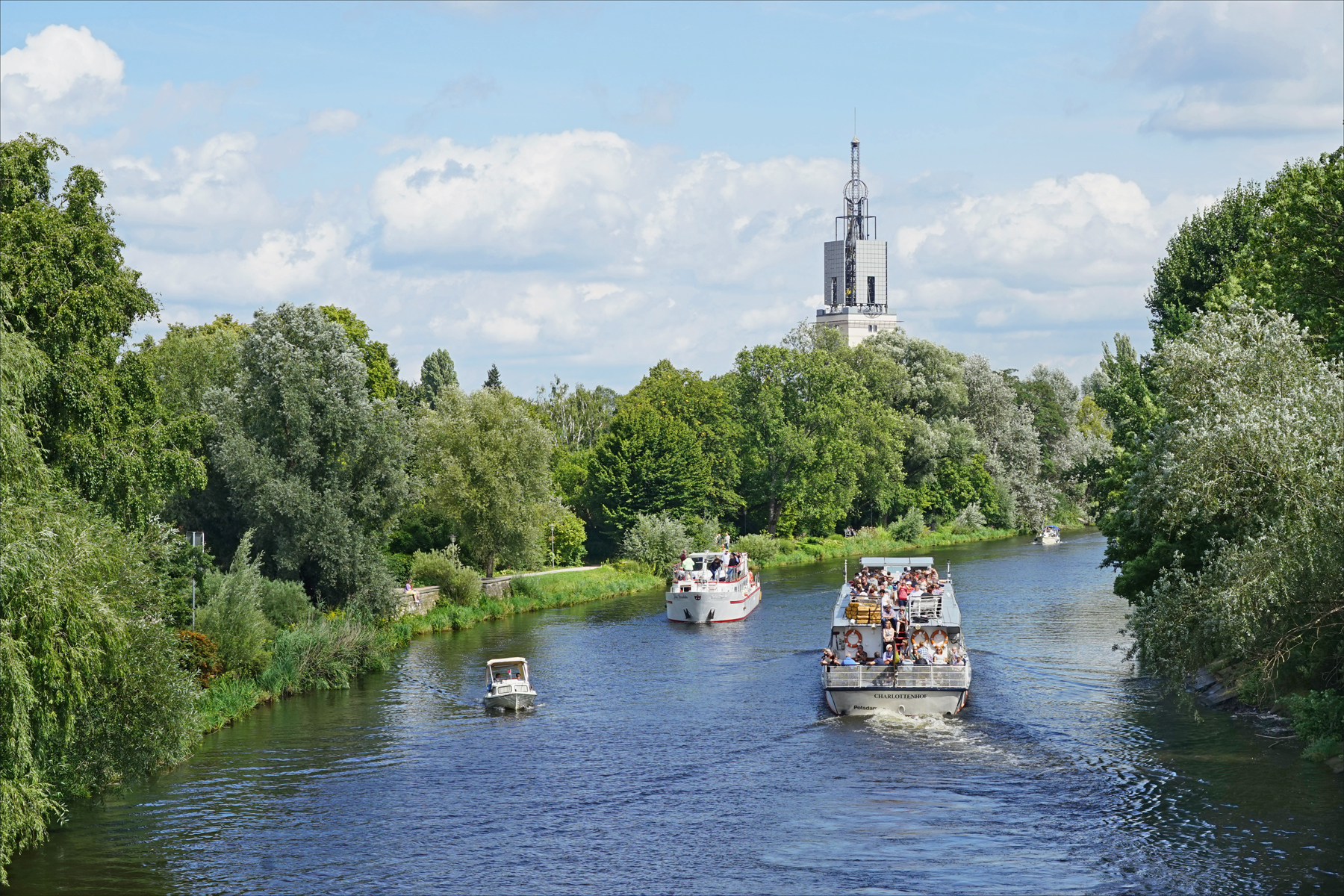
- The Havel in Potsdam

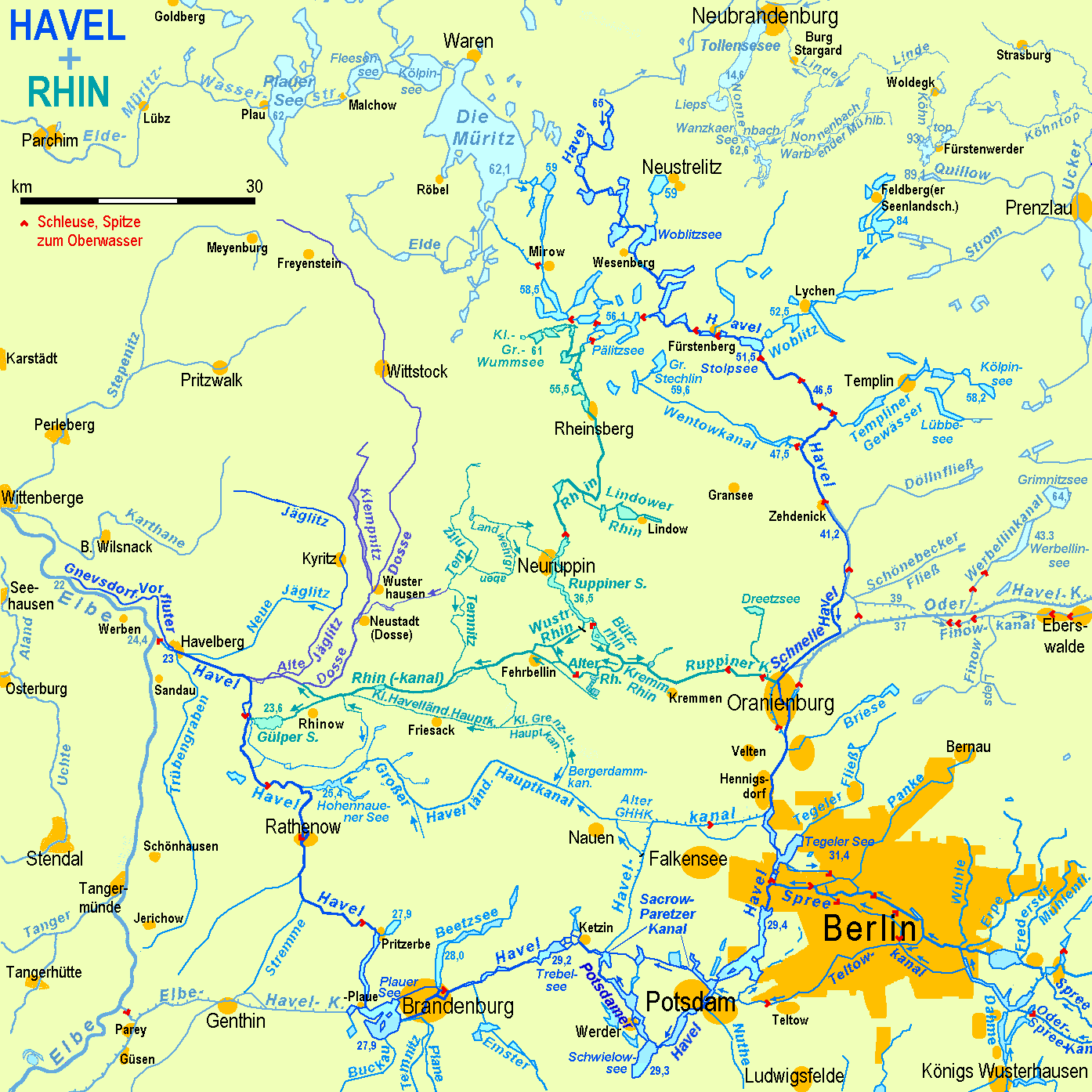
- Rivers Havel (dark blue) and Rhin (turquoise)

Location
- Country: Germany
- Cities: Oranienburg; Berlin; Potsdam; Werder (Havel); Brandenburg an der Havel; Rathenow; Havelberg

Physical characteristics
- Source
  - location: Ankershagen, Mecklenburg
  - coordinates: 53.467778°N 12.935556°E
  - elevation: 65 m (213 ft)
- Mouth: Elbe
  - location: Rühstädt-Gnevsdorf
  - coordinates: 52.908333°N 11.877222°E
  - elevation: 22 m (72 ft)
- Length: 324 km (201 miles)
- Basin size: 23,858 km^{2} (9,212 mi^{2})
- Discharge
  - location: Havelberg
  - average: 103 m^{3}/s (3,600 cu ft/s)
  - minimum: 18.8 m^{3}/s (660 cu ft/s)
  - maximum: 215 m^{3}/s (7,600 cu ft/s)

Basin features
- Progression: Elbe→ North Sea
- Tributaries
  - left: Woblitz, Briese, Tegeler Fließ, Spree, Nuthe, Plane, Buckau
  - right: Rhin, Dosse

The Havel (German: [ˈhaːfl̩]) is a river in northeastern Germany, flowing through the states of Mecklenburg-Vorpommern, Brandenburg, Berlin and Saxony-Anhalt. The 325-kilometre-long (202 mi) Havel is a right tributary of the Elbe. However, the direct distance from its source to its mouth is only 94 kilometres (58 mi). For much of its length, the Havel is navigable; it provides an important link in the waterway connections between the east and west of Germany, as well as beyond.

== Sources ==
The source of the Havel is located in the Mecklenburg Lake District, between Lake Müritz and the city of Neubrandenburg. There is no obvious visible source in the form of a spring, but the river originates in the lakes in the Diekenbruch near Ankershagen, close to and south-east of the watershed between the North and Baltic seas. From there the river initially flows southward, eventually joining the Elbe, which in turn flows into the North Sea. Every river north-east of it flows to the Baltic Sea. The river enters Brandenburg near the town of Fürstenberg. In its upper course and between Berlin and Brandenburg an der Havel the river forms several lakes.

The Havel's main tributary is the Spree, which joins the Havel in Spandau, a western borough of Berlin, and is longer and delivers more water than the Havel itself above the confluence. The second largest tributary is the Rhin, named in the Middle Ages by settlers from the lower Rhine. At the southern end of the Ruppiner See, weirs can distribute the waters of the Rhin either east- or westwards, rejoining the Havel in two places 67 kilometres (42 mi) apart along a straight line, and more than 160 kilometres (99 mi) apart along the course of the river.

The region around and north of the middle Havel is called the Havelland. It consists of sandy heights, sometimes called Ländchen, and low marshes, called luchs. A few kilometres of the river before its confluence with the Elbe near Havelberg are in the State of Saxony-Anhalt. Due to its minimal gradient it is susceptible to high waters in the Elbe.

Unless in extreme floods, if the dike of the Elbe is submerged, the discharge of the Havel is improved by the Gnevsdorfer Vorfluter (something like "Gnevsdorfer outfall"). By this canal, the mouth of the Havel, that naturally would be near Havelberg, is placed 11 km (6.8 mi) downstream. As the course of the Elbe has a higher gradient than the Havel, the water level of the Havel in Havelberg can be kept 1.4 m (4 ft 7 in) below the Elbe (at the junction of the traverse communicating canal, protected by a lock).

Towns along the river include: Fürstenberg, Zehdenick, Oranienburg, Berlin, Potsdam, Werder, Ketzin, Brandenburg, Premnitz, Rathenow and Havelberg.

== History ==
In earlier Greek or Latin sources, such as Tacitus's Germania, the name of the river was also written as Habola, Habula, Havela. The river name Havel is related to German Haff, habe, hafen, MHG Hafen meaning port, harbor).

The Slavic people who later moved into the Havel area were referred to in German sources as Heveller (occasionally as Havolane).

== Navigation ==
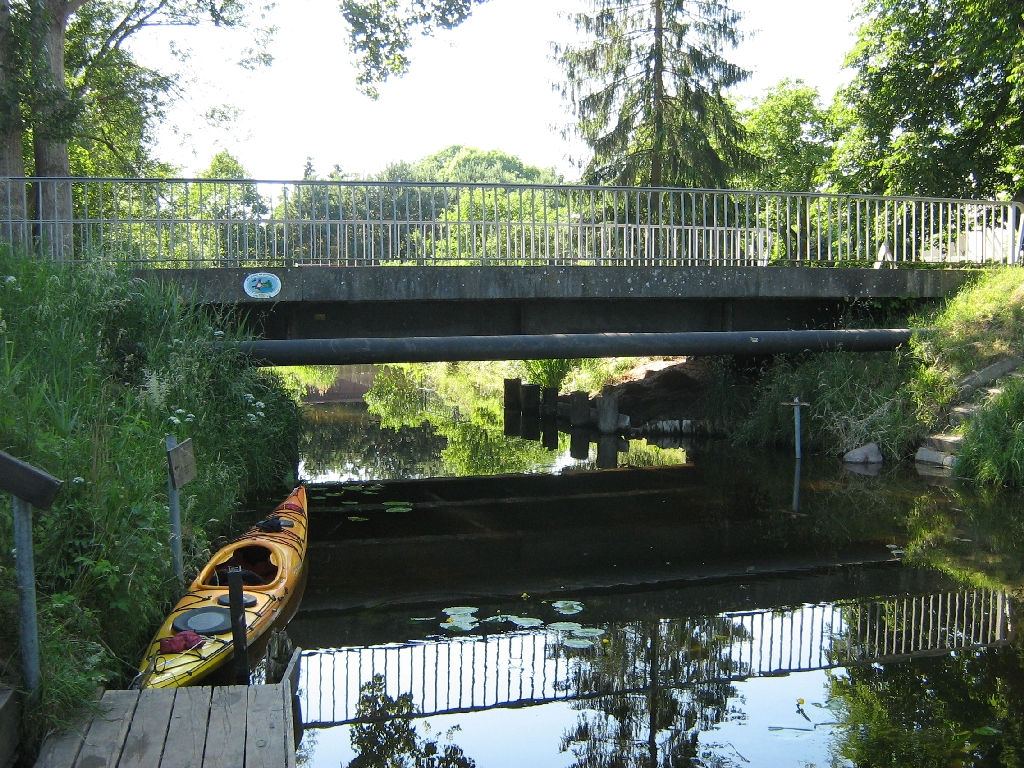
The Havel in Blankenförde is navigable to canoes and light craft only

The Havel is navigable from the Mecklenburg Lake District to its confluence with the Elbe. Whilst its upper reaches carry little other than leisure traffic, further downstream it provides an important link in the German commercial waterway network, carrying traffic from the Rhine and the North Sea to Berlin and Poland.

From a navigation perspective, the Havel can be split into four sections with somewhat different characteristics and different administrative arrangements.

=== Head of navigation to Liebenwalde ===
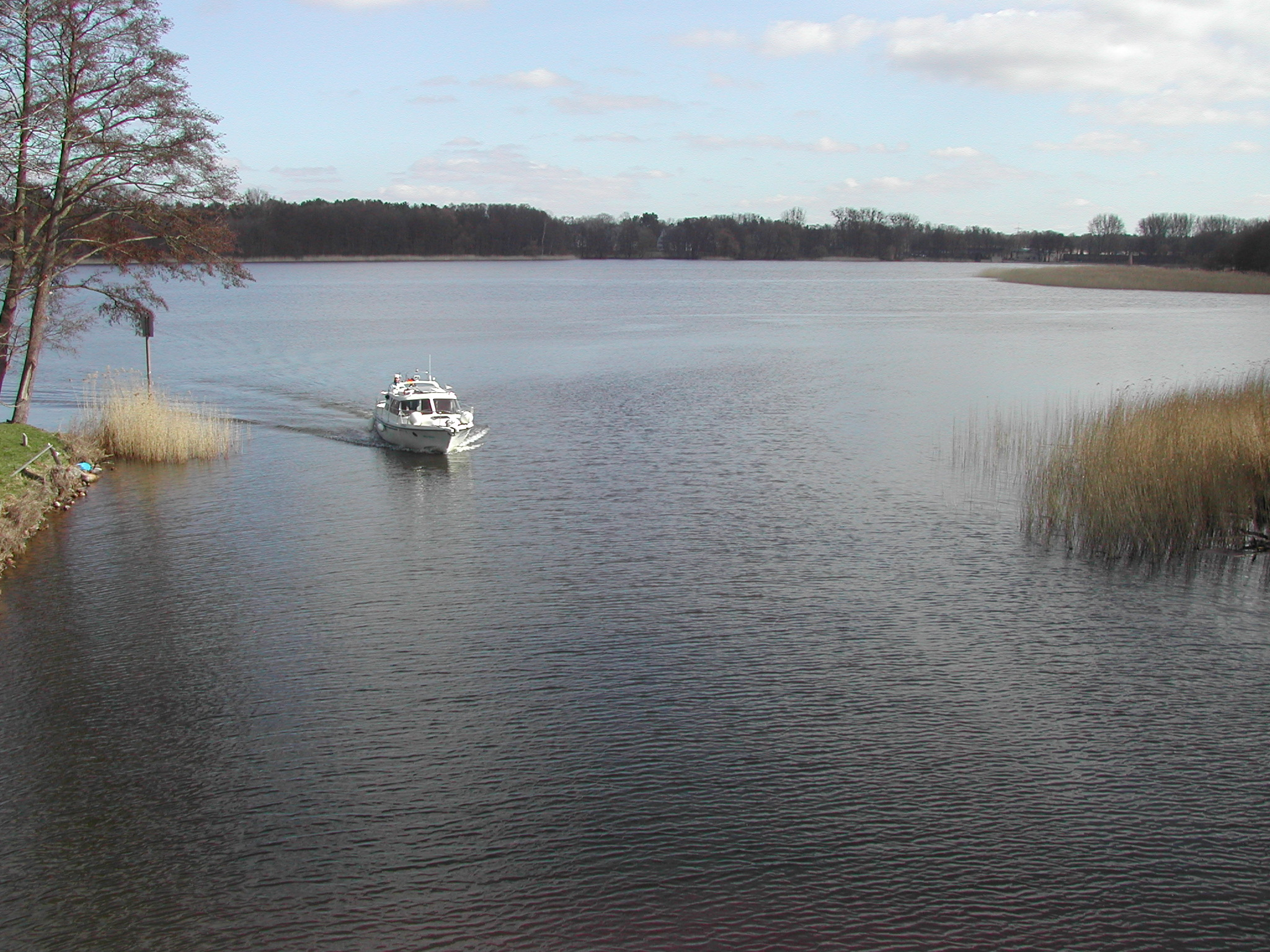
The Havel passing through Schwedtsee

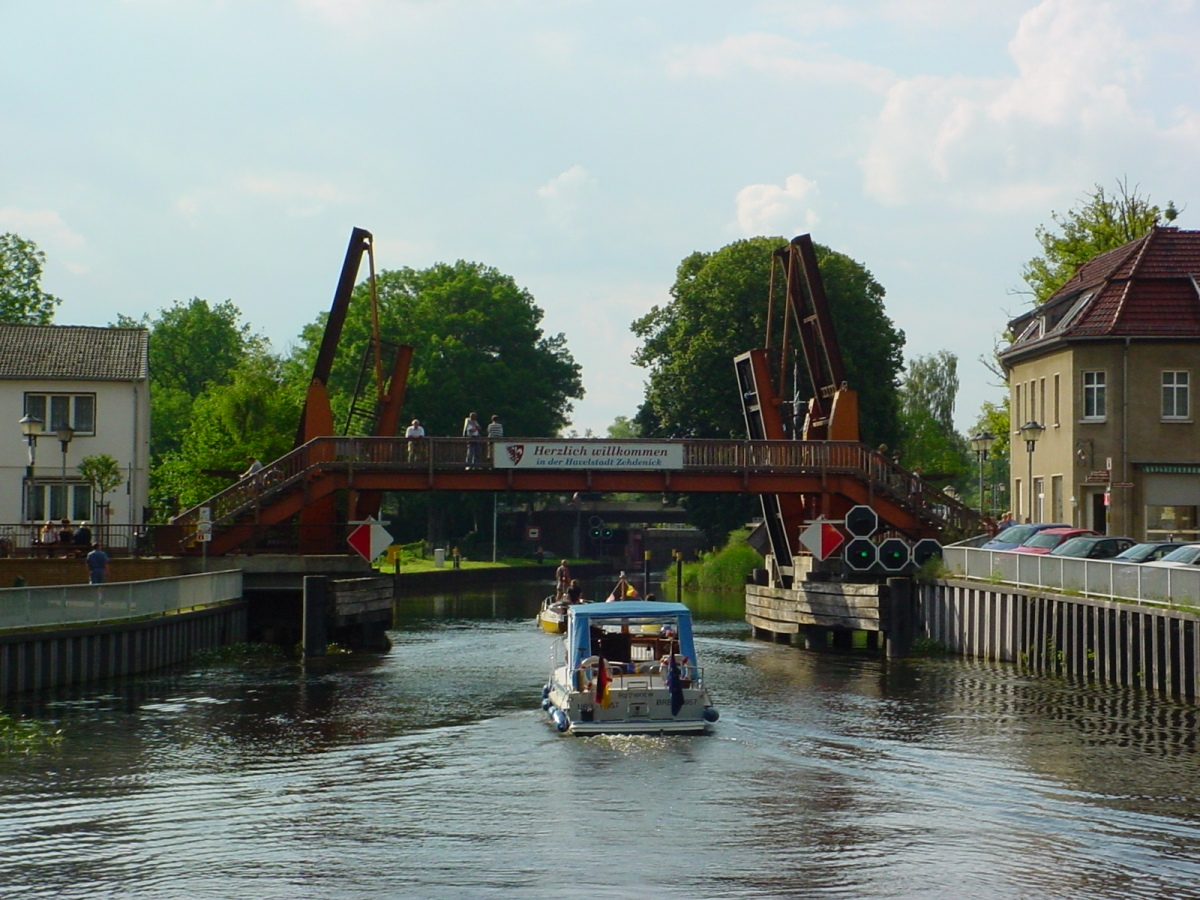
Foot and lift bridge in Zehdenick

The Havel is navigable to canoes and similar small craft from close to its source. Motor craft are prohibited above the first lock at Zwenzow, which links the Useriner See to the Großer Labussee. The stretch of the river between this lock and the junction with the Oder–Havel Canal is administered as part of the Obere–Havel–Wasserstraße, along with various connecting canals and waterways.

From Zwenzow downstream to Liebenwalde is a distance of 92 kilometres (57 mi). In this distance the navigation passes through the lakes of Großer Labussee, Woblitzsee, Wangnitzsee, Großer Priepertsee, Ellbogensee, Ziernsee, Röblinsee, Baalensee, Schwedtsee and Stolpsee. It also descends through the locks at Wesenberg, Steinhavelmühle, Fürstenberg, Bredereiche, Regow, Zaaren, Schorfheide, Zehdenick, Bischofswerder and Liebenwalde.

The Woblitzsee also gives access to the Kammer Canal, which allows vessels to reach Neustrelitz. The Ellbogensee links to the Müritz–Havel–Wasserstraße, which proceeds deeper into the Mecklenburg Lake District, eventually connecting with the Müritz–Elde–Wasserstraße. Other connected waterways are the Lychener Gewässer, the Templiner Gewässer and the Wentow Gewässer.

=== Liebenwalde to Spandau ===
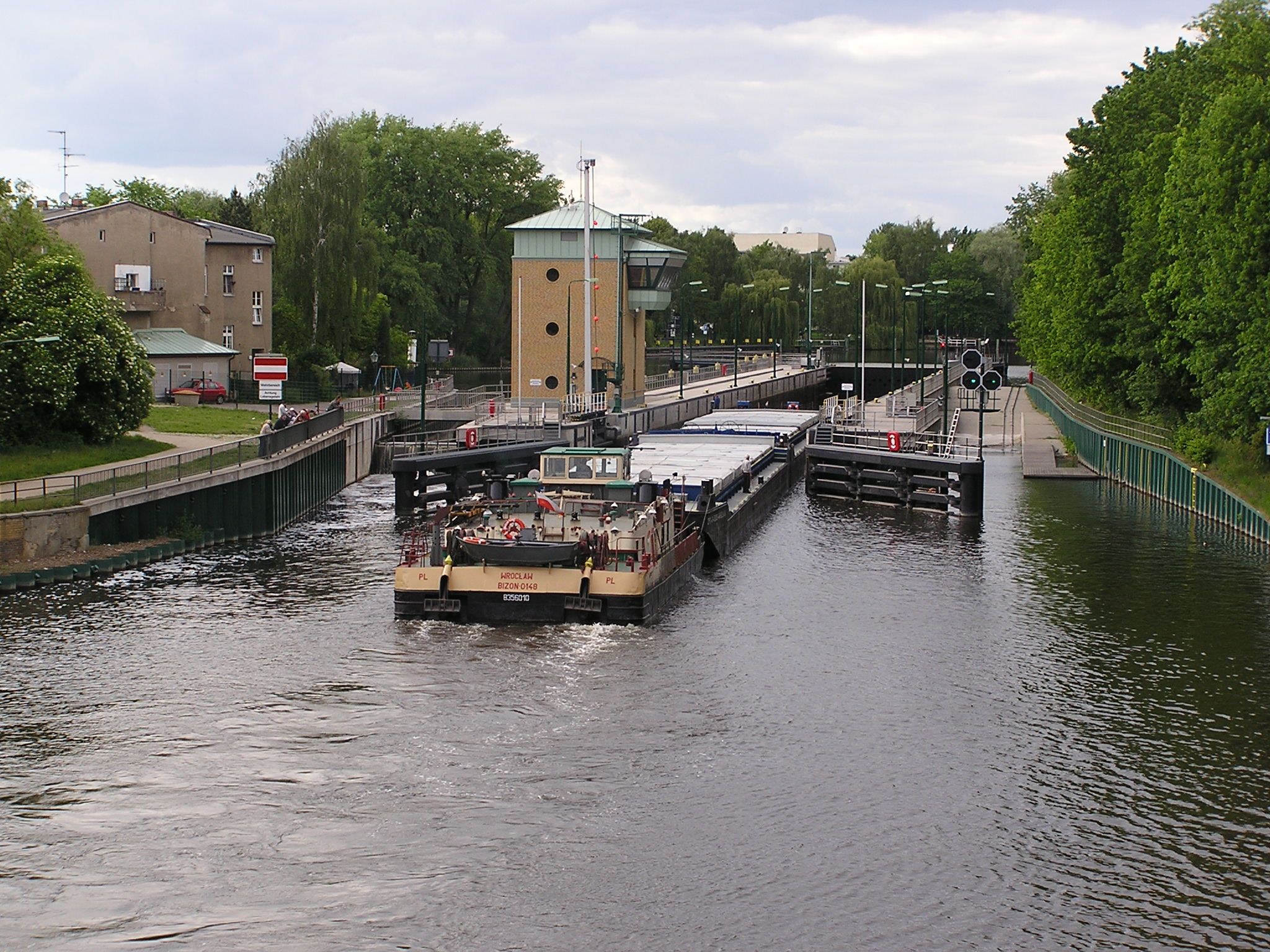
A barge tow passing through Spandau Lock

The stretch of the river between the junction with the Oder–Havel Canal near Liebenwalde and the confluence with the Spree at Spandau is administered as part of the Havel–Oder–Wasserstraße, which also includes the Oder-Havel Canal. This stretch of the river forms part of the main inland waterway route from Germany to Poland and carries significant commercial traffic. This stretch of the river is 40 kilometres (25 mi) long, and the river descends through two locks at Lehnitz and Spandau.

At Hennigsdorf, 30 kilometres (19 mi) downstream of Liebenwalde, the Havel Canal joins the river on the west bank. This canal connects to Paretz, on the Havel downstream, and was built in the 1950s to allow East German vessels to avoid the stretch of the river under the political control of West Berlin. Some 7 kilometres (4.3 mi) further downstream, the Berlin-Spandau Ship Canal joins the river on the east bank, providing a connection to central Berlin without passing through the lock at Spandau.

A car ferry crosses the river between Hakenfelde and Konradshöhe, in the Berlin boroughs of Spandau and Reinickendorf respectively.

The last 10 kilometres (6 mi) of this stretch of the river, from Hennigsdorf, passes through a series of interconnected lakes, including the large Tegeler See. The river enters Berlin 6 kilometres (4 mi) before Spandau, having formed the boundary for the previous 4 kilometres (2.5 mi). During the partition of Germany, this formed the border between East Germany and West Berlin, and border control points were established for vessels navigating the river.

=== Spandau to Plaue ===
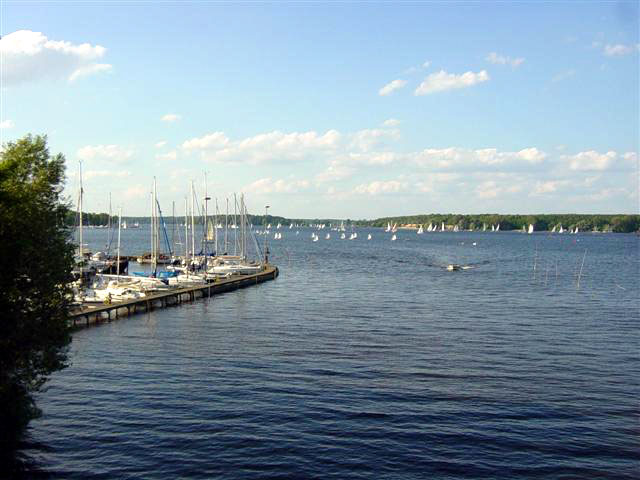
The Wannsee, looking north and upriver, with leisure craft in evidence

The stretch of the river between the confluence with the Spree at Spandau and the junction with the Elbe–Havel Canal at Plaue is administered as part of the Lower Havel–Waterway, which also includes the stretch of river downstream to the confluence with the Elbe. Between Spandau and Plaue, the river forms part of the main inland waterway route from the Rhine and the west of Germany; from Hamburg and the North Sea ports, to both Berlin and Poland. It thus carries a considerable amount of commercial traffic.

South of Spandau, the river widens into a wide lake that extends, through some narrower areas, to Potsdam. On the east bank south of Spandau is the Grunewald with several beaches, among them the Großes Fenster (German pronunciation: [ˈɡʁoːsəs ˈfɛnstɐ]; literally "Great Window") with an unobstructed view upriver, hence the name, followed by the island of Schwanenwerder and the large arm known as the Großer Wannsee. This part of the river can be very busy with leisure craft. The island of Pfaueninsel is also a feature of this stretch of the river. A public ferry crosses these waters between Wannsee and Kladow, carrying passengers and cyclists.

The Teltow Canal joins the river from the east via the Griebnitzsee just before the city reaches the city of Potsdam, providing an alternative route to the Oder–Spree Canal avoiding central Berlin. The Griebnitz Canal provides a short cut for smaller vessels from the Griebnitzsee to the Großer Wannsee.

At Potsdam the navigation splits into two channels. The Havel, here known as the Potsdamer Havel, takes a route southwest through Potsdam and the Templiner See to the Schwielowsee, then northwest to Paretz, whilst the Sacrow–Paretz Canal takes a shorter route due east to Paretz, saving some 13 kilometres (8.1 mi) compared to the 29-kilometre (18 mi) Potsdamer Havel. The Potsdamer Havel is crossed by the Kiewitt Ferry in Potsdam itself, and by the Caputh Ferry at the entrance to the Schweilowsee.

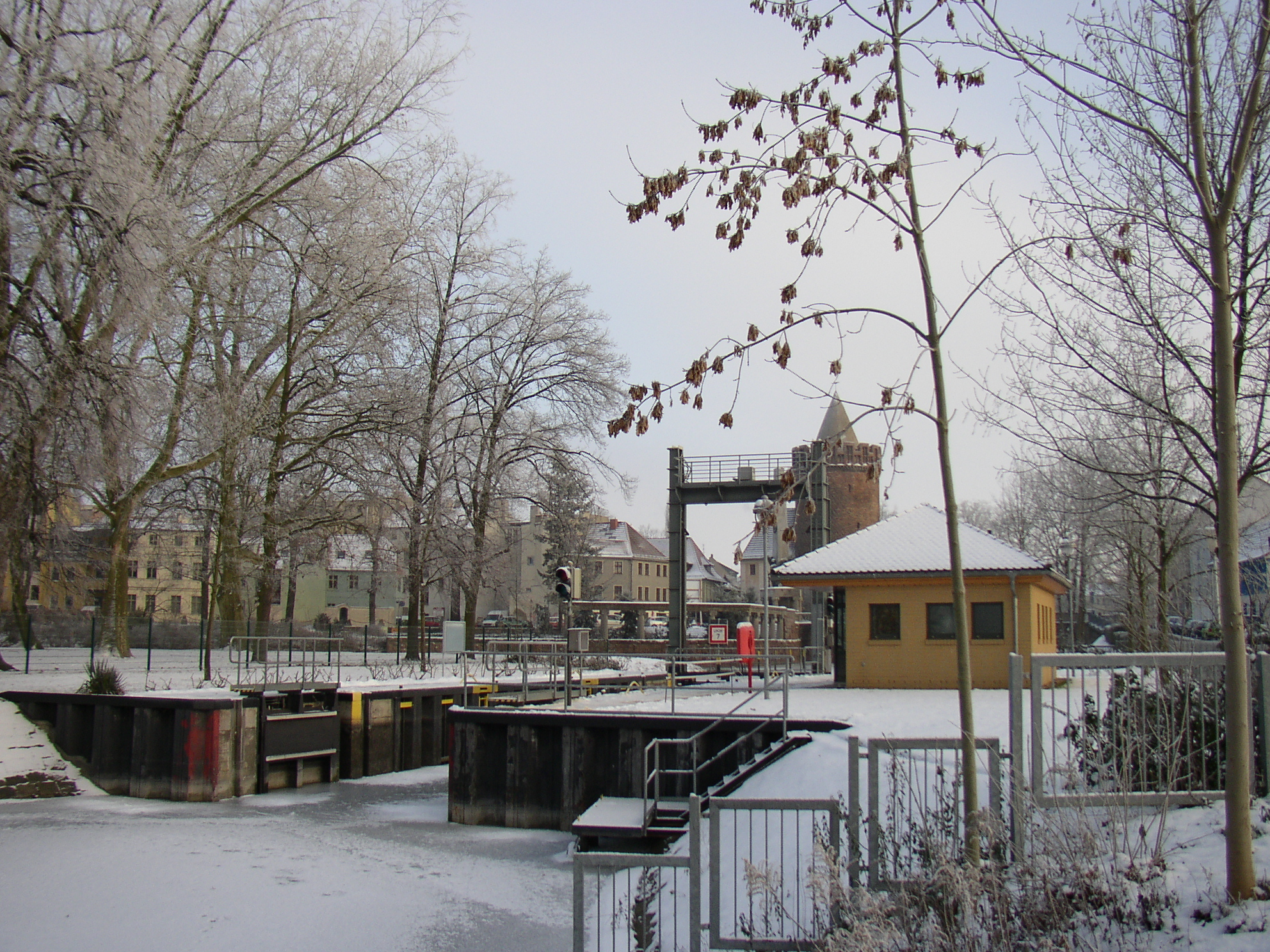
The Stadtschleuse on the Brandenburg City Canal in winter

At Paretz the two channels join up again, as does the Havel Canal from further upstream. Just downstream of Paretz, the river is crossed by the Ketzin Cable Ferry. At Brandenburg an der Havel, the navigation again splits into two routes. Commercial shipping descends through a lock into the Silo Canal that passes to the north of the city centre. Leisure craft pass through the centre of the city, using the short Brandenburg City Canal, a smaller lock, then a stretch of the river. Both routes rejoin in the linked lakes of Breitling See and Plauer See, which leads up to Plaue.

=== Plaue to Havelberg ===
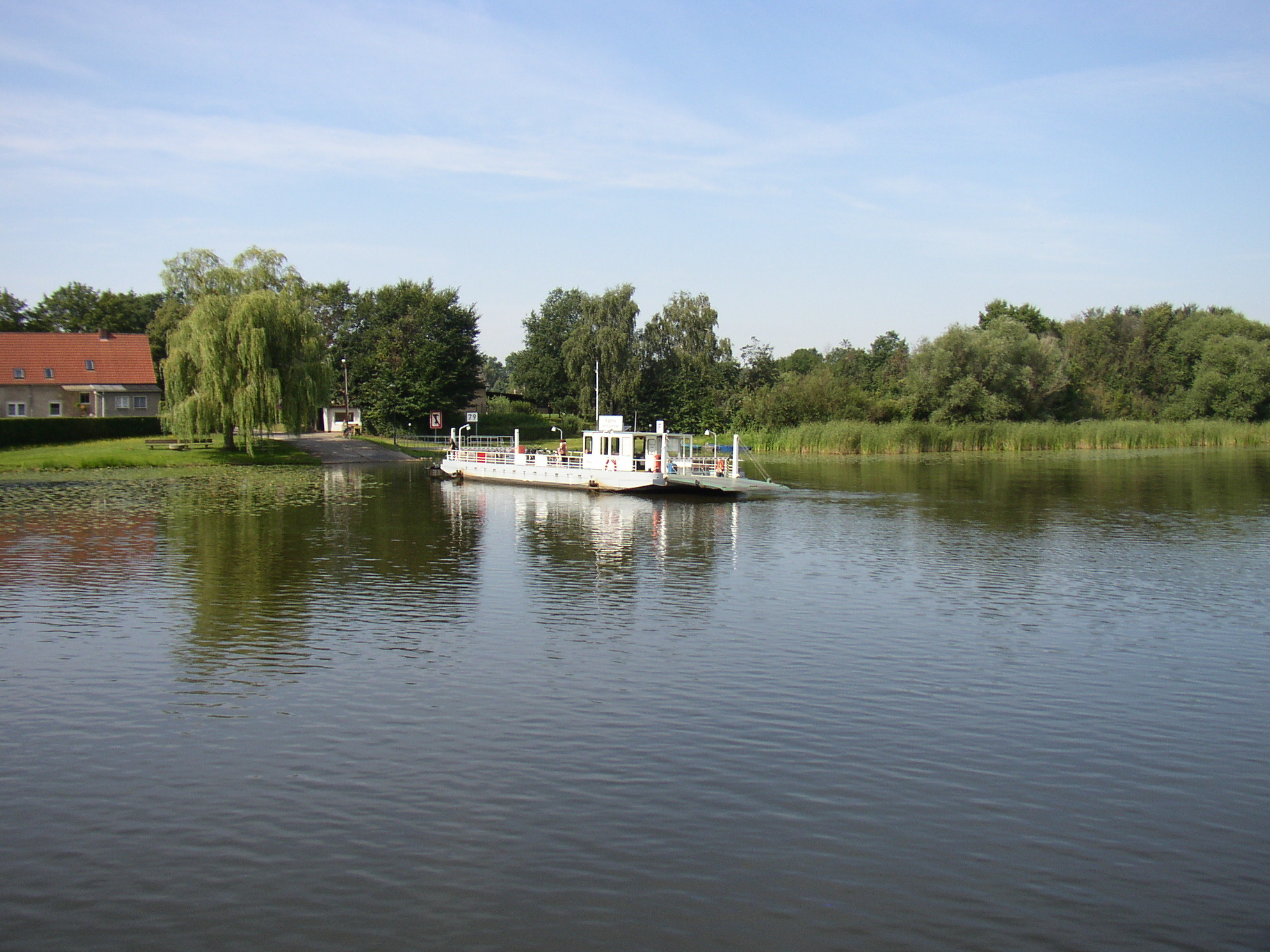
The Pritzerbe Ferry across the Havel

Like the preceding stretch of the river, the stretch from Plaue to the confluence with the Elbe at Havelberg is administered as part of the Lower Havel–Waterway. Unlike the previous stretch, this stretch carries considerably less commercial traffic.

Vessels heading to or from the Rhine and the west of Germany take the Elbe–Havel Canal at Plaue. Whilst the lower reaches of the Havel provide the most direct route to Hamburg and the North Sea ports, variable water levels in the Elbe affect those in the lower Havel; together these can restrict navigation. A less direct, but more reliable route is available via the Elbe–Havel Canal, the Magdeburg Water Bridge, the Mittelland Canal and the Elbe Lateral Canal.

This stretch of the river descends through locks at Bahnitz, Rathenow, Grütz, Garz and Havelberg. At Rathenow there are two channels, each with a lock. North of Plaue, the river is crossed by the Pritzerbe Ferry.

== Gallery ==
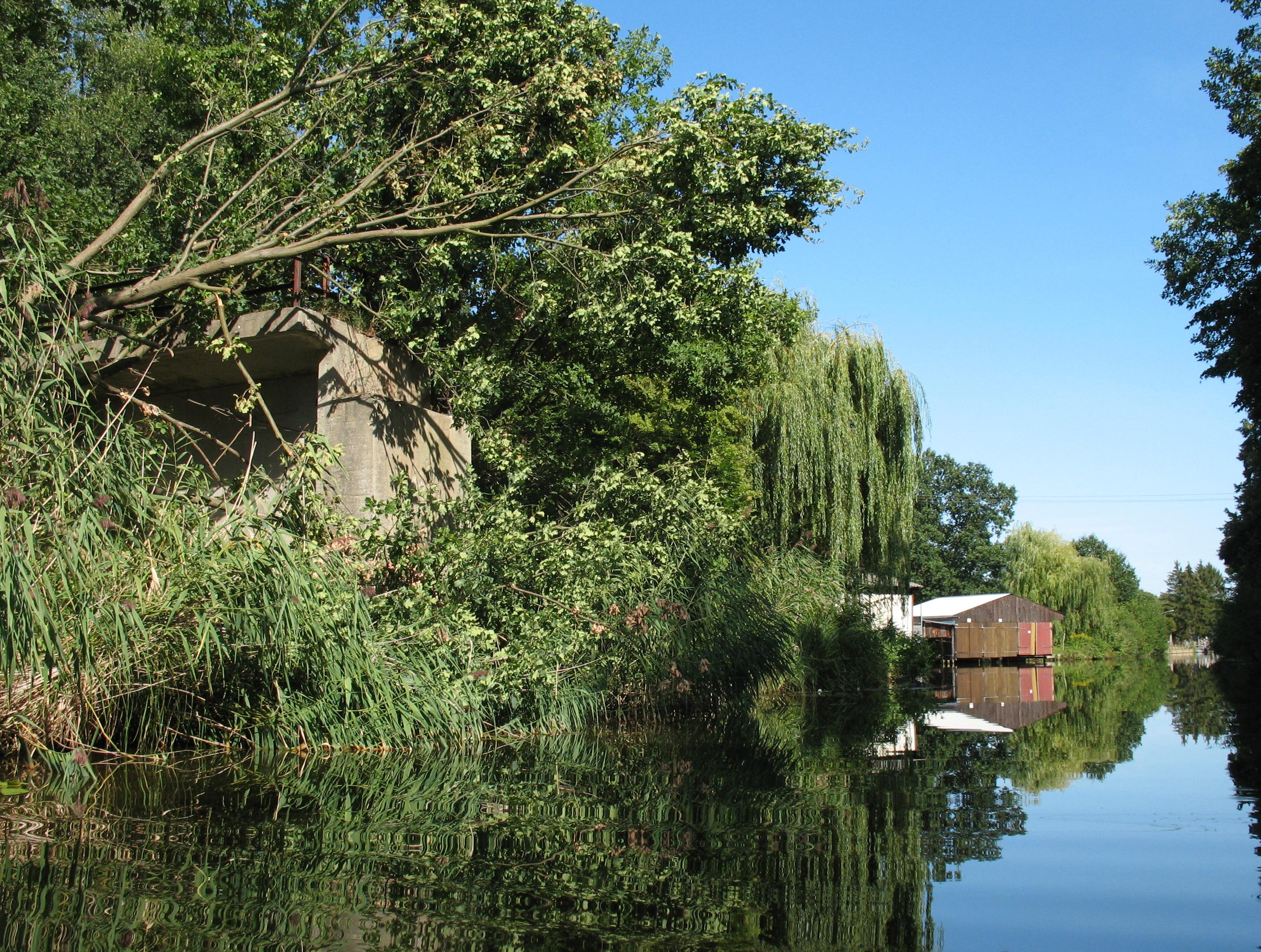
Wentow channel in Zehdenick

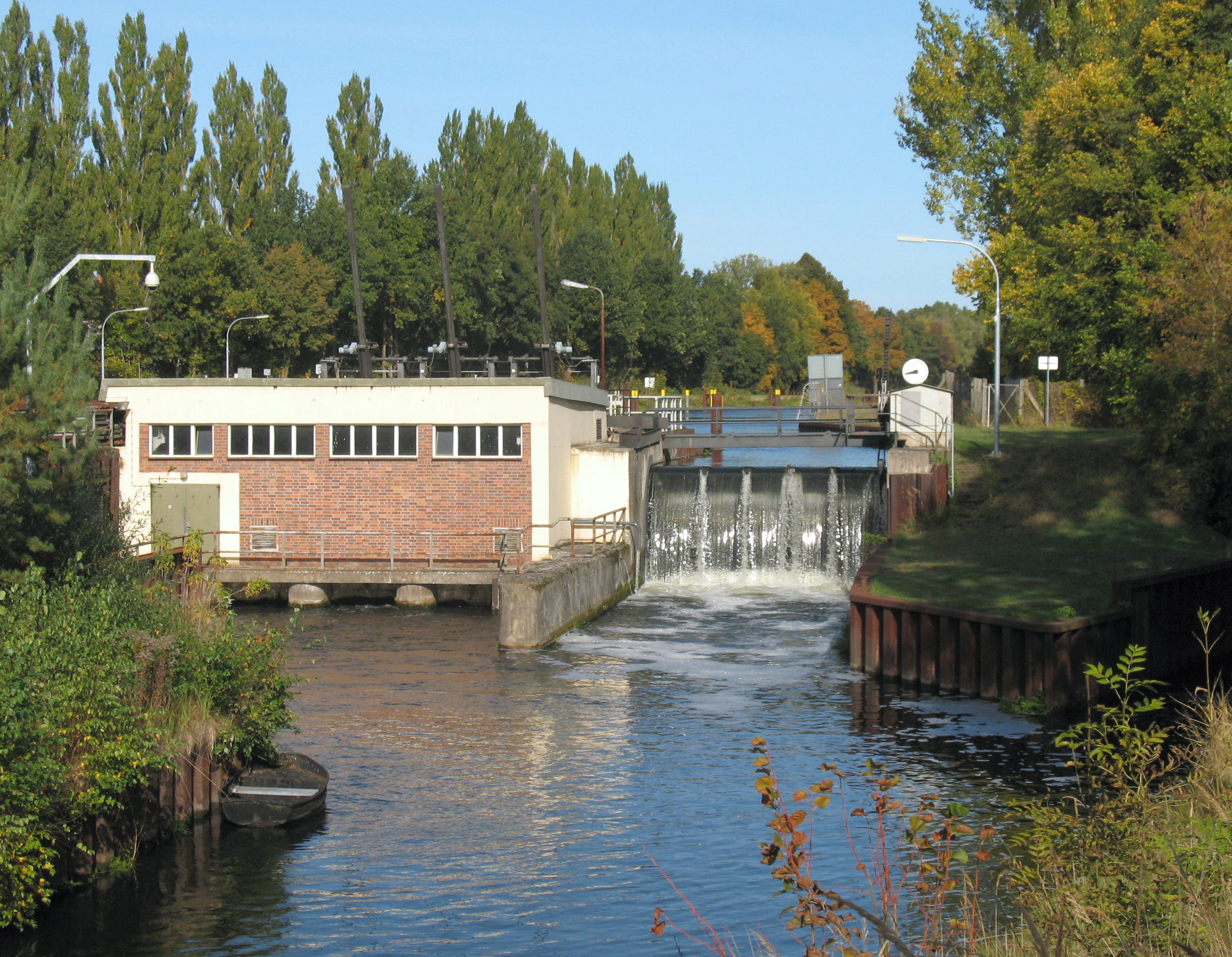
Weir of Voss Channel in Liebenwalde-Bischofswerder

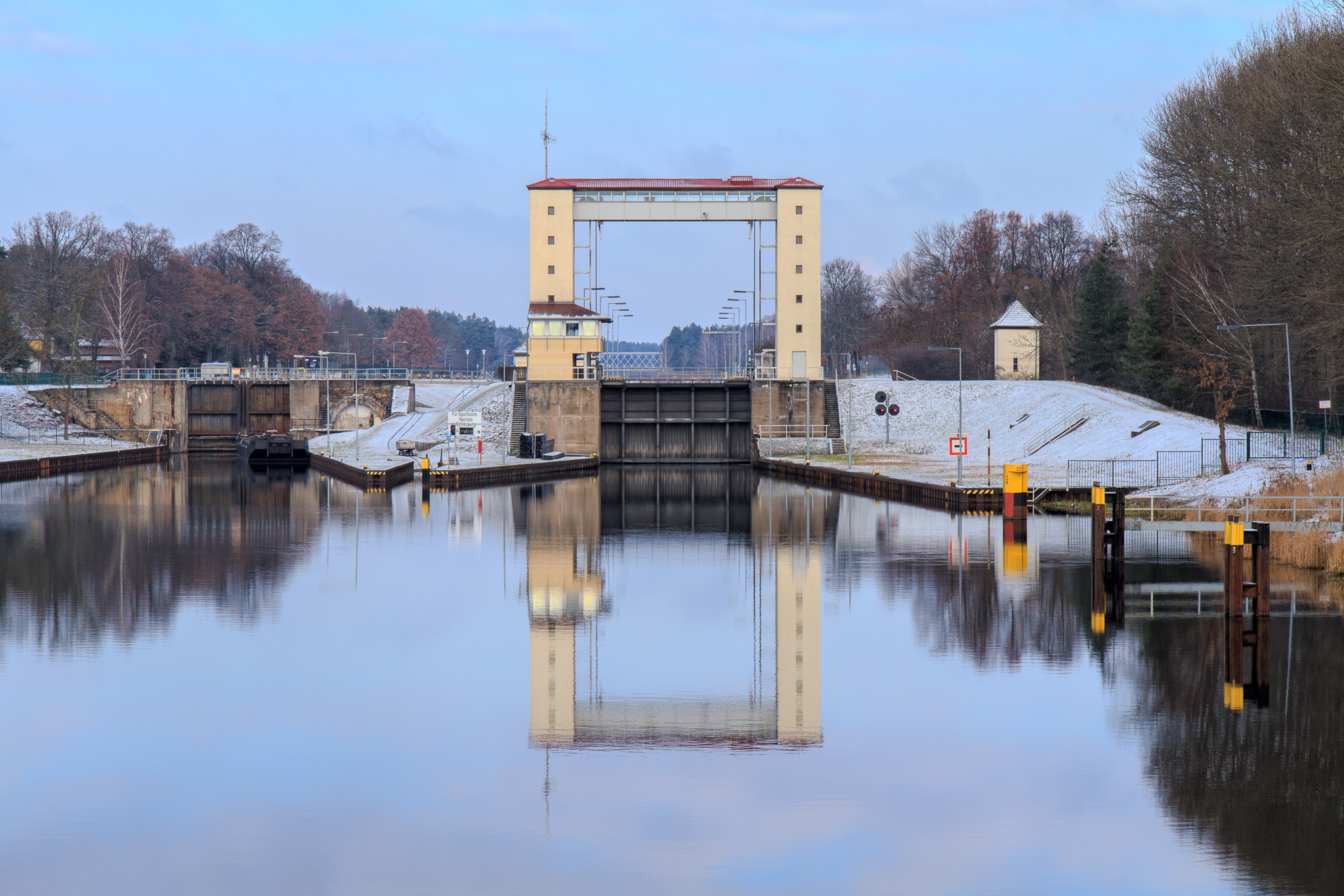
Lehnitz lock in Oranienburg

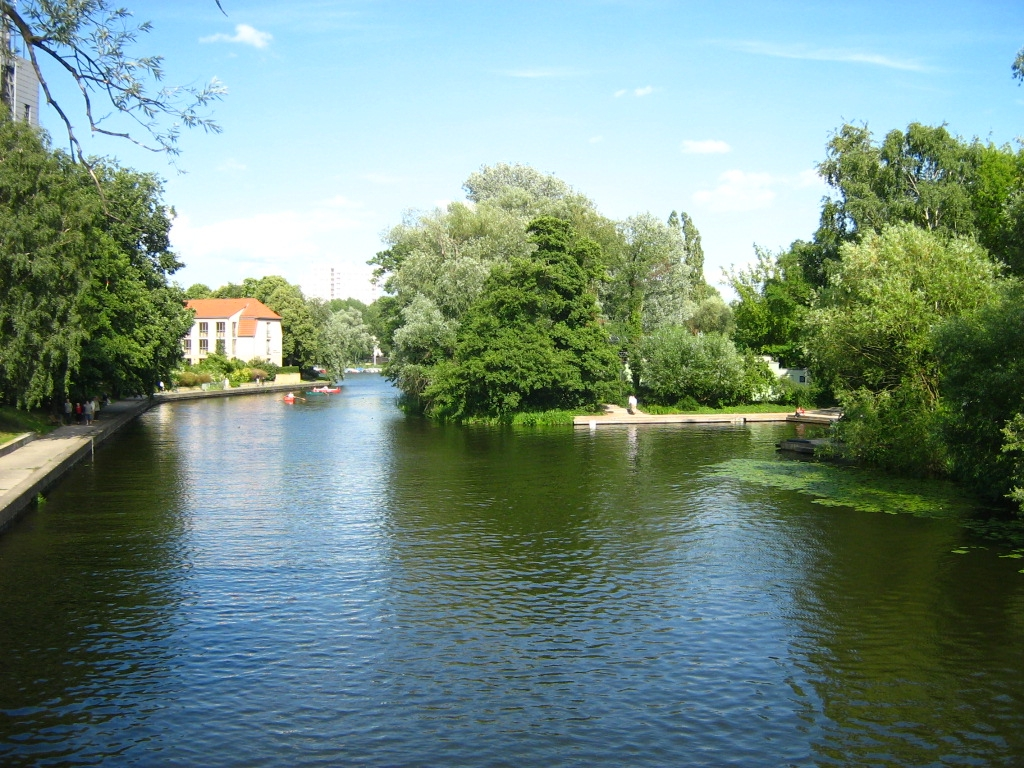
Alte Fahrt branch in Potsdam

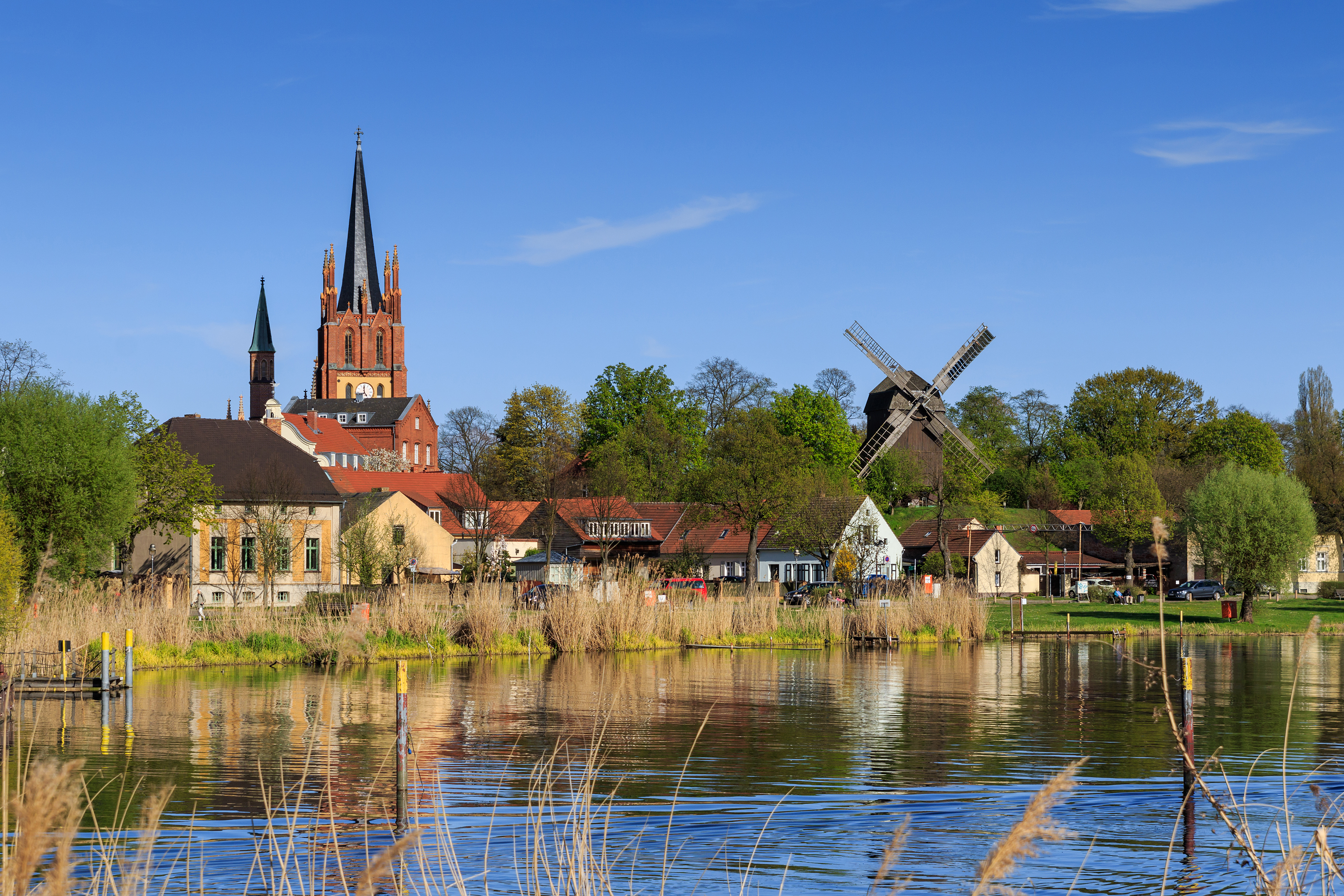
Werder an der Havel

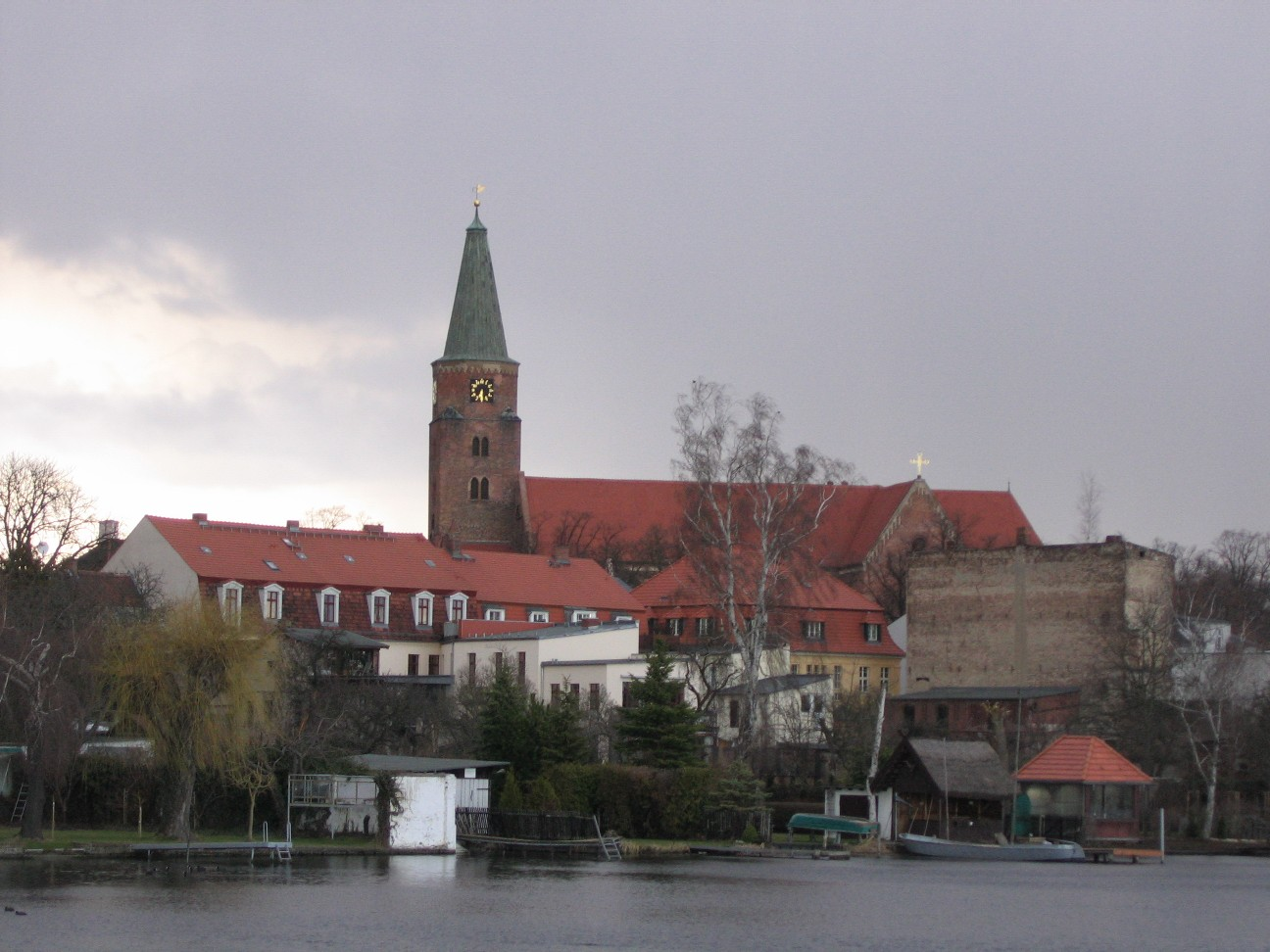
Brandenburg an der Havel

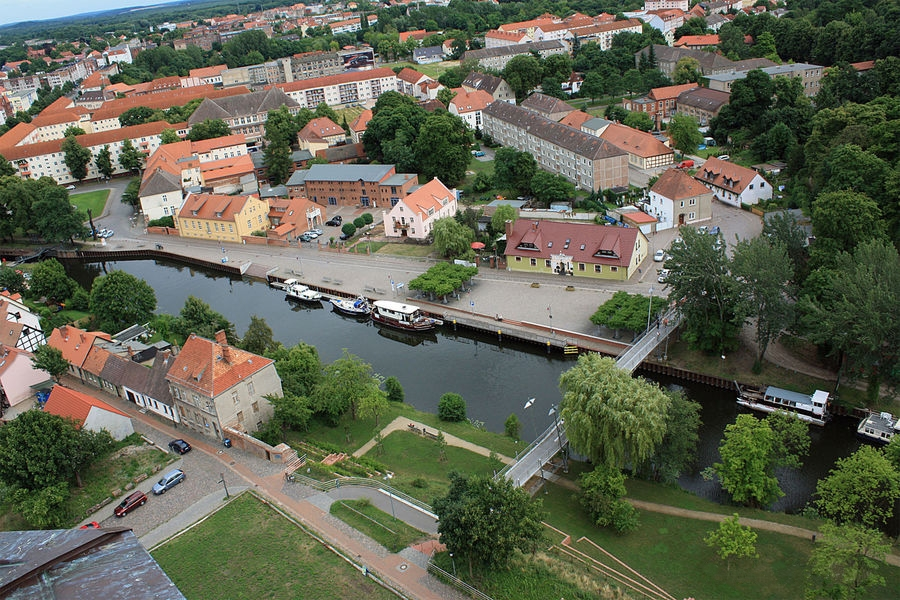
Old harbour in Rathenow

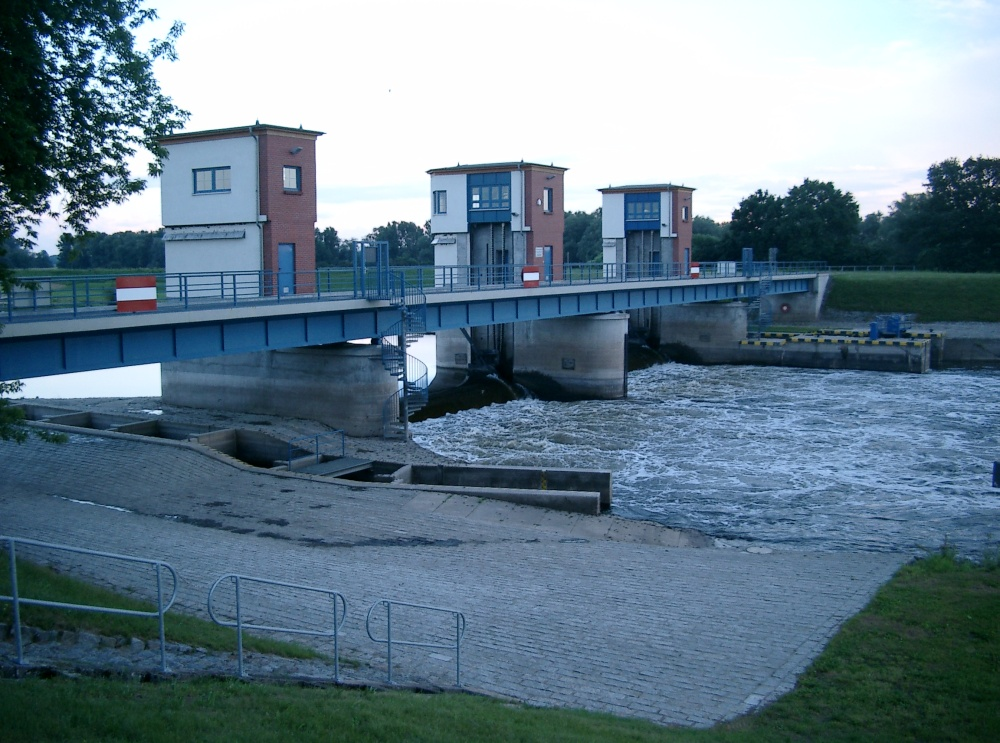
Gnevsdorf outfall

== See also ==
- Tiefwerder Wiesen
- Pichelswerder
