= Martin Blumner =

German composer, conductor and music theorist

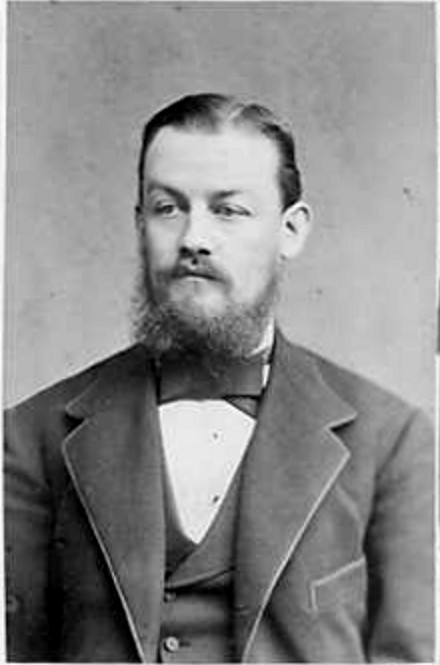
Martin Blumner

Martin Traugott Wilhelm Blumner (21 November 1827, Fürstenberg/Havel - 16 November 1901, Berlin) was a German composer, conductor and music theorist. He was the younger brother of the Berlin-born pianist and composer Sigismund Blumner (1826–1893).
