= List of canals in Germany =

This is a list of navigable canals that are at least partially located in Germany. The canals are listed here in alphabetic order of the name (without generic).

== Currently navigable canals ==
| Canal name (English) | Canal name (German) | From | To |
|---|---|---|---|
| Berlin-Spandau Ship Canal | Berlin-Spandauer Schifffahrtskanal | River Havel at Spandau | River Spree near the Hauptbahnhof in Berlin |
| Brandenburg City Canal | Brandenburger Stadtkanal | River Havel upstream of Brandenburg an der Havel | River Havel in central Brandenburg an der Havel |
| Britz Canal | Britzer Verbindungskanal | Teltow Canal in Berlin | River Spree in Berlin |
| Charlottenburg Canal | Charlottenburger Verbindungskanal | Westhafen Canal at Charlottenburg in Berlin | River Spree and Landwehr Canal at Charlottenburg in Berlin |
| Dahme Flood Relief Canal | Dahme-Umflutkanal | River Spree at Leibsch | River Dahme at Märkisch Buchholz |
| Datteln-Hamm Canal | Datteln-Hamm-Kanal | Dortmund-Ems Canal at Datteln | Hamm-Uentrop |
| Dortmund–Ems Canal | Dortmund-Ems-Kanal | Dortmund | River Ems near Papenburg |
| Elbe–Havel Canal | Elbe-Havel-Kanal | River Elbe near Magdeburg | River Havel near Brandenburg |
| Elbe Lateral Canal | Elbe-Seitenkanal | River Elbe near Lauenburg | Mittelland Canal near Wolfsburg |
| Elbe–Lübeck Canal | Elbe-Lübeck-Kanal | River Elbe at Lauenburg | River Trave at Lübeck |
| Elbe-Weser Waterway | Elbe-Weser-Schifffahrtsweg | Otterndorf | Bremerhaven |
| Elisabethfehn Canal | Elisabethfehnkanal | Küsten Canal near Kampe | River Leda near Elisabethfehn |
| Ems-Jade Canal | Ems-Jade-Kanal | River Ems at Emden | Jade Estuary at Wilhelmshaven |
| Ems Lateral Canal | Ems-Seitenkanal | River Ems in Oldersum | Emden Inner Harbour |
| Ems-Vecht Canal | Ems-Vechte-Kanal | River Ems south of Lingen | River Vechte at Nordhorn |
| Finow Canal | Finowkanal | River Havel at Liebenwalde | Oder-Havel Canal at Liepe |
| Gieselau Canal | Gieselaukanal | Kiel Canal at Oldenbüttel | River Eider 2 km (1.2 mi) north |
| Gosen Canal | Gosener Kanal | Seddinsee in Berlin | Dämeritzsee in Berlin |
| Griebnitz Canal | Griebnitzkanal | Griebnitzsee in Berlin | Großer Wannsee in Berlin |
| Havel Canal | Havelkanal | River Havel at Hennigsdorf | River Havel at Paretz |
| Kammer Canal | Kammerkanal | Zierker See near Neustrelitz | Woblitzsee |
| Karl Heine Canal | Karl-Heine-Kanal | White Elster River in Leipzig | Elster-Saale Canal in Leipzig |
| Kiel Canal | Nord-Ostsee-Kanal | River Elbe at Brunsbüttel | Baltic Sea at Kiel-Holtenau |
| Küsten Canal | Küstenkanal | Dortmund-Ems Canal at Dörpen | River Hunte at Oldenburg |
| Landwehr Canal | Landwehrkanal | River Spree at Berlin-Charlottenburg | River Spree at Berlin-Treptow |
| Mittelland Canal | Mittellandkanal | Dortmund-Ems Canal at Hörstel | River Elbe near Magdeburg |
| Neukölln Ship Canal | Neuköllner Schifffahrtskanal | Landwehr Canal in Berlin | Teltow Canal in Berlin |
| Oder–Havel Canal | Oder-Havel-Kanal | River Havel near Hennigsdorf | River Oder at Oderberg |
| Oder–Spree Canal | Oder-Spree-Kanal | River Dahme at Berlin-Schmöckwitz | River Oder at Eisenhüttenstadt |
| Rhine–Herne Canal | Rhein-Herne-Kanal | River Rhine at Duisburg | Dortmund-Ems Canal near Waltrop |
| Rhine–Main–Danube Canal | Main-Donau-Kanal | River Main at Bamberg | River Danube at Kelheim |
| Ruhr Ship Canal | Ruhrschifffahrtskanal | Rhine at Duisburg | Mülheim an der Ruhr |
| Silo Canal | Silokanal | River Havel upstream of Brandenburg an der Havel | Quenzsee and River Havel downstream of Brandenburg an der Havel |
| Sacrow–Paretz Canal | Sacrow-Paretzer-Kanal | River Havel at Potsdam | River Havel at Paretz |
| Teltow Canal | Teltowkanal | River Havel at Potsdam | River Dahme at Berlin-Grünau |
| Wesel–Datteln Canal | Wesel-Datteln-Kanal | River Rhine at Wesel | Dortmund-Ems Canal at Datteln |
| Westhafen Canal | Westhafenkanal | Berlin-Spandau Ship Canal at the Westhafen in Berlin | River Spree at Charlottenburg in Berlin |

== Formerly navigable canals ==
| Canal name (English) | Canal name (German) | From | To |
|---|---|---|---|
| Aller Canal | Allerkanal | Weyhausen near Wolfsburg | Brenneckenbrück, 5 km W of Gifhorn |
| Eider Canal | Eider-Kanal | Eider River near Rendsburg | Kieler Förde near Kiel |
| Fossa Carolina | Karlsgraben | Swabian Rezat River (in the Rhine basin) | Altmühl River (in the Danube basin) |
| Ludwig Canal | Ludwigskanal | Main River at Bamberg | Danube River at Kelheim |
| Luisenstadt Canal | Luisenstädtischer Kanal | Spree River at Mitte in Berlin | Landwehr Canal at Kreuzberg in Berlin |
| Oste-Hamme Canal | Oste-Hamme-Kanal | Oste River near Spreckens | Hamme River near Viehspecken |
| Stecknitz Canal | Stecknitzfahrt | Elbe River near Lauenburg | Trave River near Lübeck |

== Incomplete navigable canal projects ==
| Canal name (English) | Canal name (German) | From | To |
|---|---|---|---|
| Elster-Saale Canal | Elster-Saale-Kanal | Karl-Heine Canal in Leipzig | Saale River near Murseburg |

== See also ==
- Transport in Germany
- List of rivers of Germany
