= Neustrelitz Little Lakes Region =

Region of Mecklenburg-Vorpommern, Germany

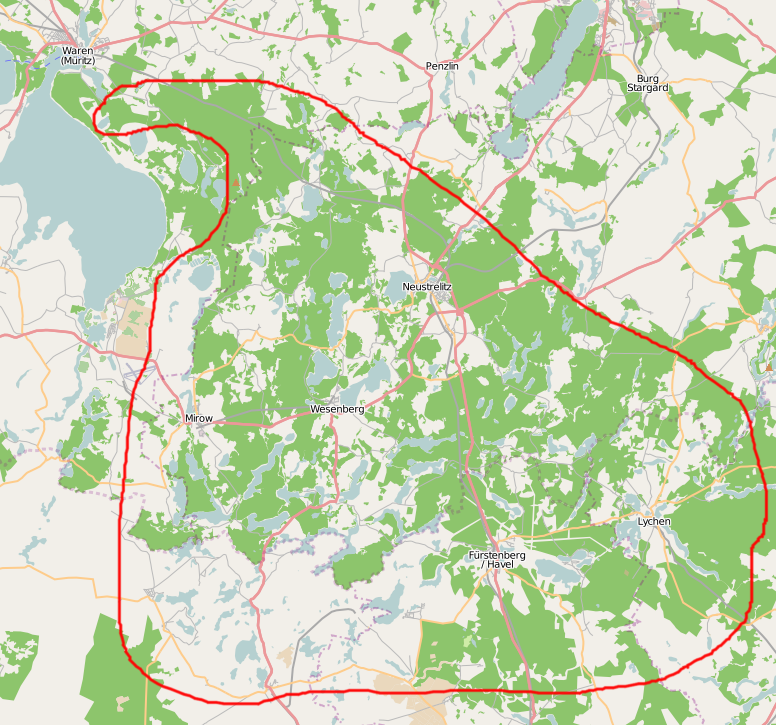
Map of the Neustrelitz Little Lakeland

The Neustrelitz Little Lakes Region (German: Neustrelitzer Kleinseengebiet) is a landscape in the south of the German state of Mecklenburg-Vorpommern, in the region around the town of Neustrelitz, and in the north of the state of Brandenburg, north of Rheinsberg. The northern part of the lakeland region is drained by the River Havel, which also has its source here. There is a link through the Prebelow Canal to the southern part, the Rheinsberg Lakeland, which is drained by the Rhin. There is another link along the Mirow Canal and the Alte Fahrt to the Mecklenburg Great Lakeland. To the east is the Feldberg Lake District.

Large parts of the northern lake region lie in the two halves (Müritz and Serrahn) of the Müritz National Park.

The lakeland was formed during the Weichselian glaciation about 12,000 years ago in the glacial meltwater valleys and sandur of the Pomeranian stage.

The lakeland lies in sandur country, that is bounded to the north and south by the main terminal moraine ridges of the Pomeranian and Frankfurt Stages, interspersed with an intermediate series that runs parallel to the terminal moraines and reaches heights of 100 metres. The highest elevations occur in the western part of the Serrahn Hills and the eastern part of the Käflingsberg.

The landscape is dominated by a large number of small lakes, the largest being the Zierker See, Großer Labussee and Useriner See in the northern part and Lake Rheinsberg and the Großer Stechlinsee in the south. The lakes are mostly elongated channels arranged as chains of lakes aligned in various directions. The main towns in the lake district, in addition to Neustrelitz, are Fürstenberg/Havel, Rheinsberg, Lychen and Mirow.

For a few years, efforts have been made, on the part of the Mecklenburg-Strelitz Wildlife Conservation Group (Naturschutzbund Mecklenburg Strelitz), to turn parts of the protected landscape of the Neustrelitz Little Lake Region and elements of the Müritz Lakes Park and Kratzeburg Havel Source Lakes into a Strelitz Little Lakes Nature Park. Because no funding was forthcoming from the state, funding for the park initiative was sought in the 2011 budget.
