= Großer Labussee =

Lake in Mecklenburg-Vorpommern, Germany

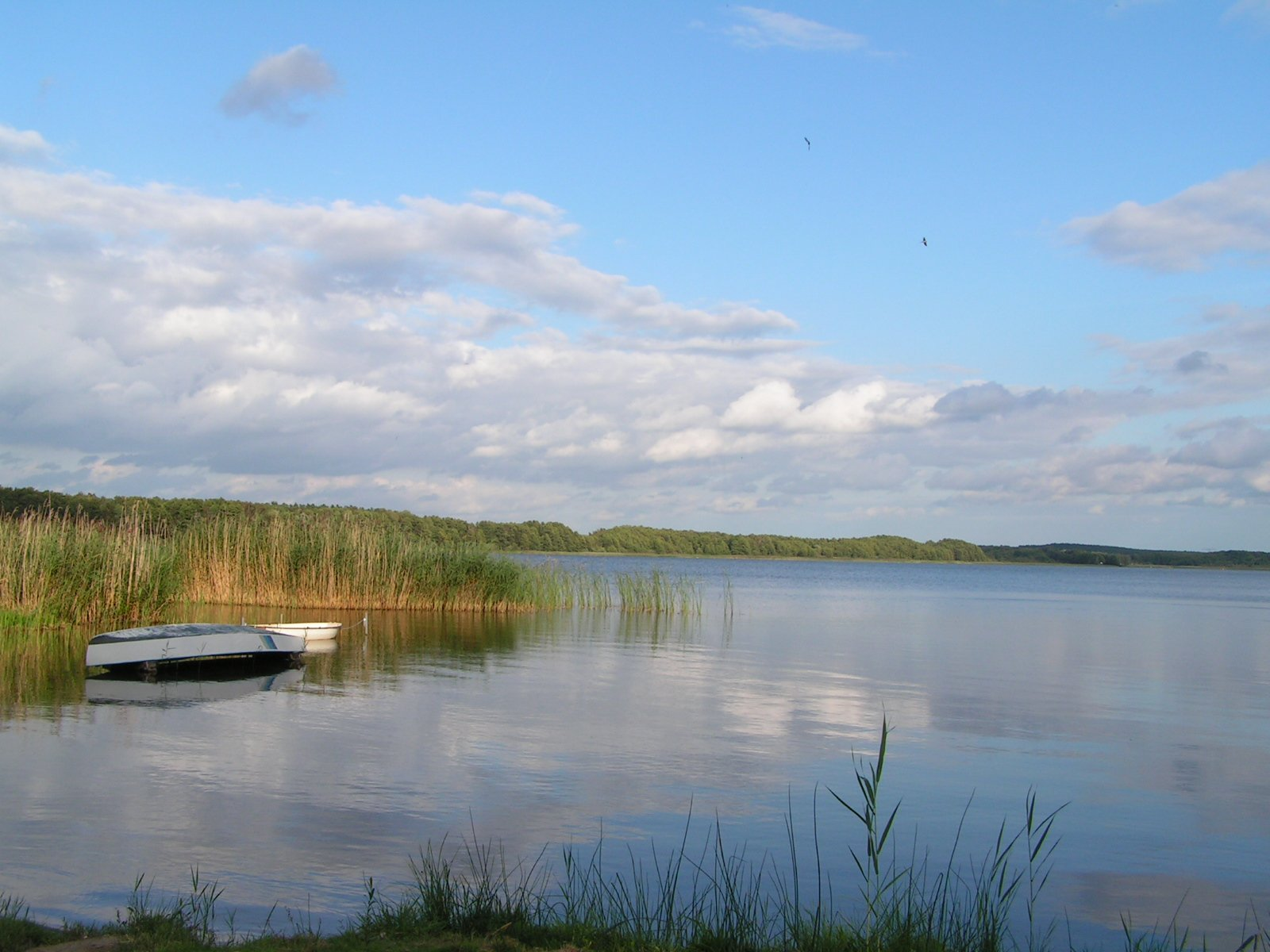

- Location within Mecklenburg-Vorpommern
- Location: Mecklenburgische Seenplatte, Mecklenburg-Vorpommern
- Coordinates: 53°18′29″N 12°57′13″E
- Primary inflows: River Havel
- Primary outflows: River Havel
- Basin countries: Germany
- Surface area: 3.3 square kilometres (1.3 sq mi)
- Average depth: 4.3 metres (14 ft)
- Max. depth: 11.9 metres (39 ft)
- Surface elevation: 57.5 metres (189 ft)

Großer Labussee is a lake in the Mecklenburg Lake District, in Germany. It is situated in the district of Mecklenburgische Seenplatte of the state of Mecklenburg-Vorpommern. Most of the lake is in the municipality Userin, with a small southern part in the municipality Wesenberg.

The lake has an elevation of 57.5 metres (189 ft) and its surface area is 3.3 square kilometres (1.3 sq mi).

The River Havel flows through the Großer Labussee, entering via a channel and lock at Zwenzow from the Useriner See, and exiting via another channel to the Woblitzsee. The Havel is generally navigable downstream of Zwenzow lock, but upstream of the lock powered craft are prohibited. Navigation is administered as part of the Obere Havel-Wasserstraße.
