= Kiel Canal =

Canal in Germany

Coordinates: 53°53′N 9°08′E

Nord-Ostsee-Kanal
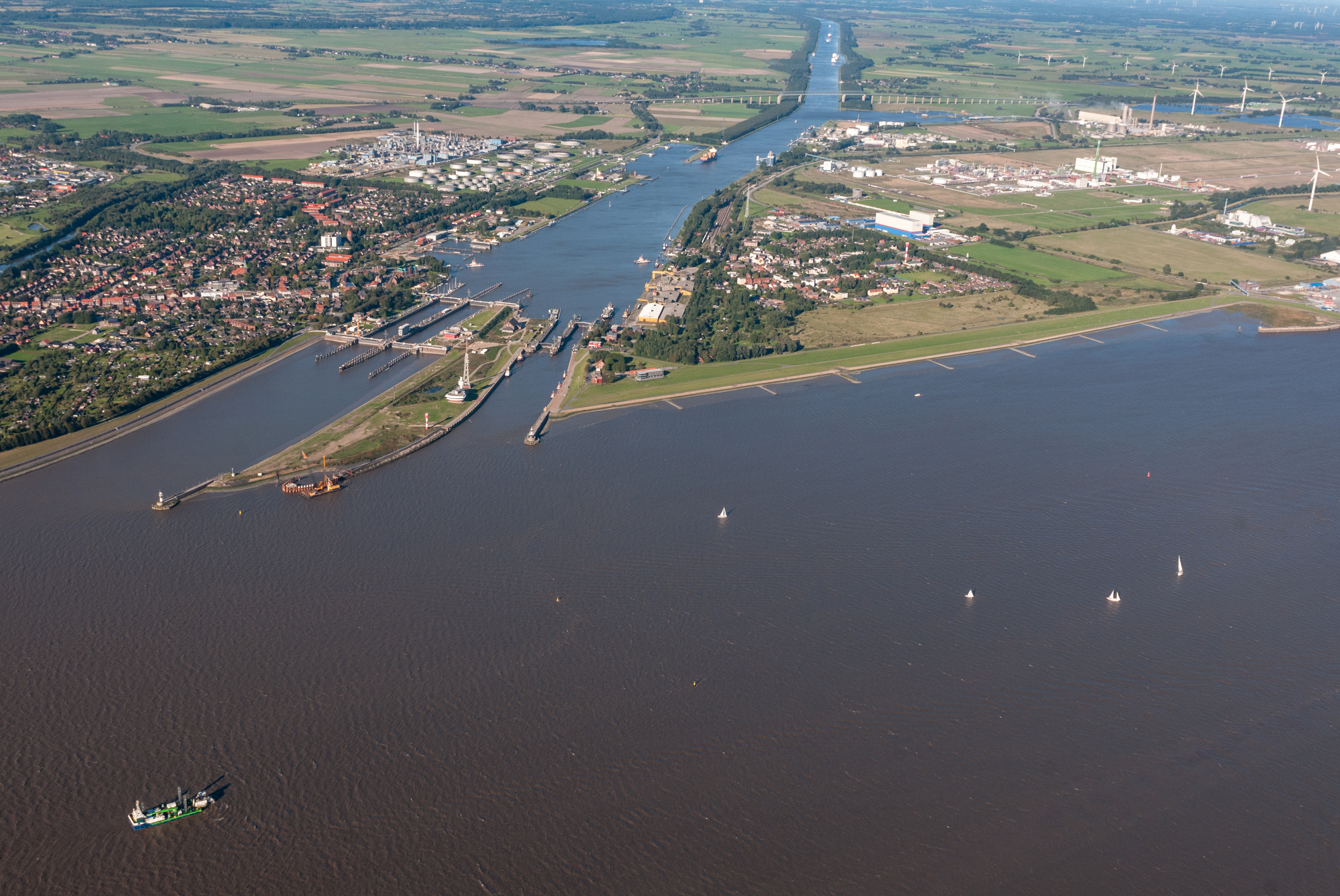
- Locks at Brunsbüttel connecting the canal to the Elbe estuary and thence to the North Sea

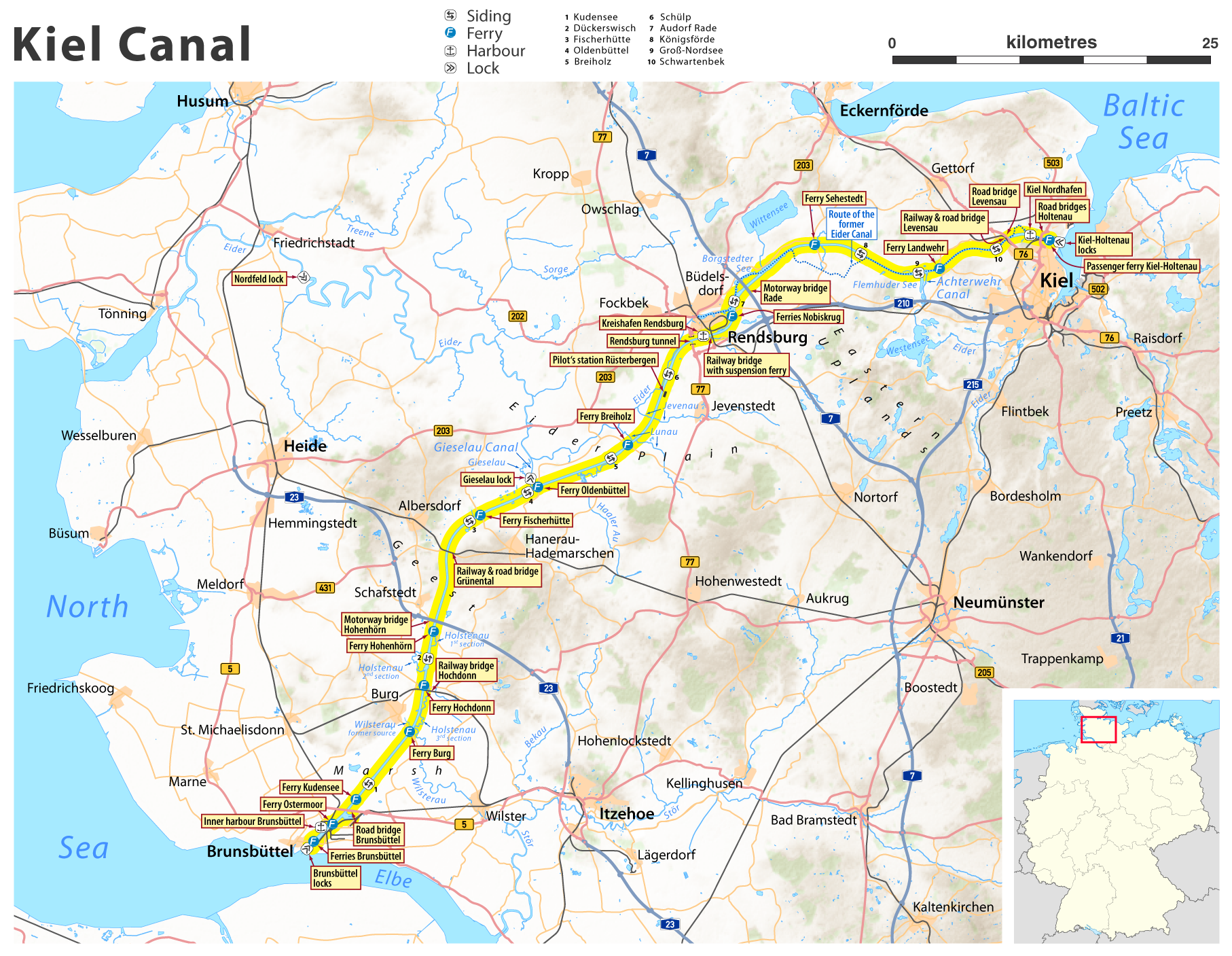
- Map of the canal
- Interactive map of Nord-Ostsee-Kanal

Specifications
- Length: 98.26 km (61.06 miles)
- Maximum boat length: 235 m (771 ft)
- Maximum boat beam: 32.5 m (107 ft)
- Maximum boat draft: 9.5 m (31 ft)

History
- Construction began: 1887
- Date completed: 1895
- Date extended: 1907–14

Geography
- Start point: Brunsbüttel (North Sea)
- End point: Holtenau, Kiel (Baltic Sea)

The Kiel Canal (German: Nord-Ostsee-Kanal, formerly Kaiser-Wilhelm-Kanal) is a 98-kilometer-long (61 mi) freshwater canal that links the North Sea to the Baltic Sea. It runs through the German state of Schleswig-Holstein, from Brunsbüttel, at the mouth of the Elbe, to Holtenau, on the Kiel Fjord. It was constructed between 1887 and 1895 and widened between 1907 and 1914. In addition to the two sea entrances, the canal is linked at Oldenbüttel to the navigable River Eider by the short Gieselau Canal.

The canal reduces the journey between the North and Baltic Seas by 460 km (290 mi) by allowing ships to bypass the Jutland peninsula and the Danish Straits. It is one of the world's most frequented artificial waterways, with an annual average of 32,000 ships (90 daily), transporting approximately 100 million tonnes of goods.

== History ==
The first connection between the North and Baltic Seas was constructed while the area was ruled by Denmark–Norway. It was called the Eider Canal and used stretches of the Eider River for the link between the two seas. Completed during the reign of Christian VII of Denmark in 1784, the Eiderkanal was a 43 km (27 mi) part of a 175 km (109 mi) waterway from Kiel to the Eider River's mouth at Tönning on the west coast. It was only 29 m (95 ft) wide with a depth of 3 m (9.8 ft), which limited the vessels that could use the canal to 300 tonnes.

After 1864, the Second Schleswig War put Schleswig-Holstein under the government of Prussia (from 1871 the German Empire). A new canal was sought by merchants and by the German navy, which wanted to link its bases in the Baltic and the North Sea without the need to sail around Denmark.

=== Construction and expansion ===
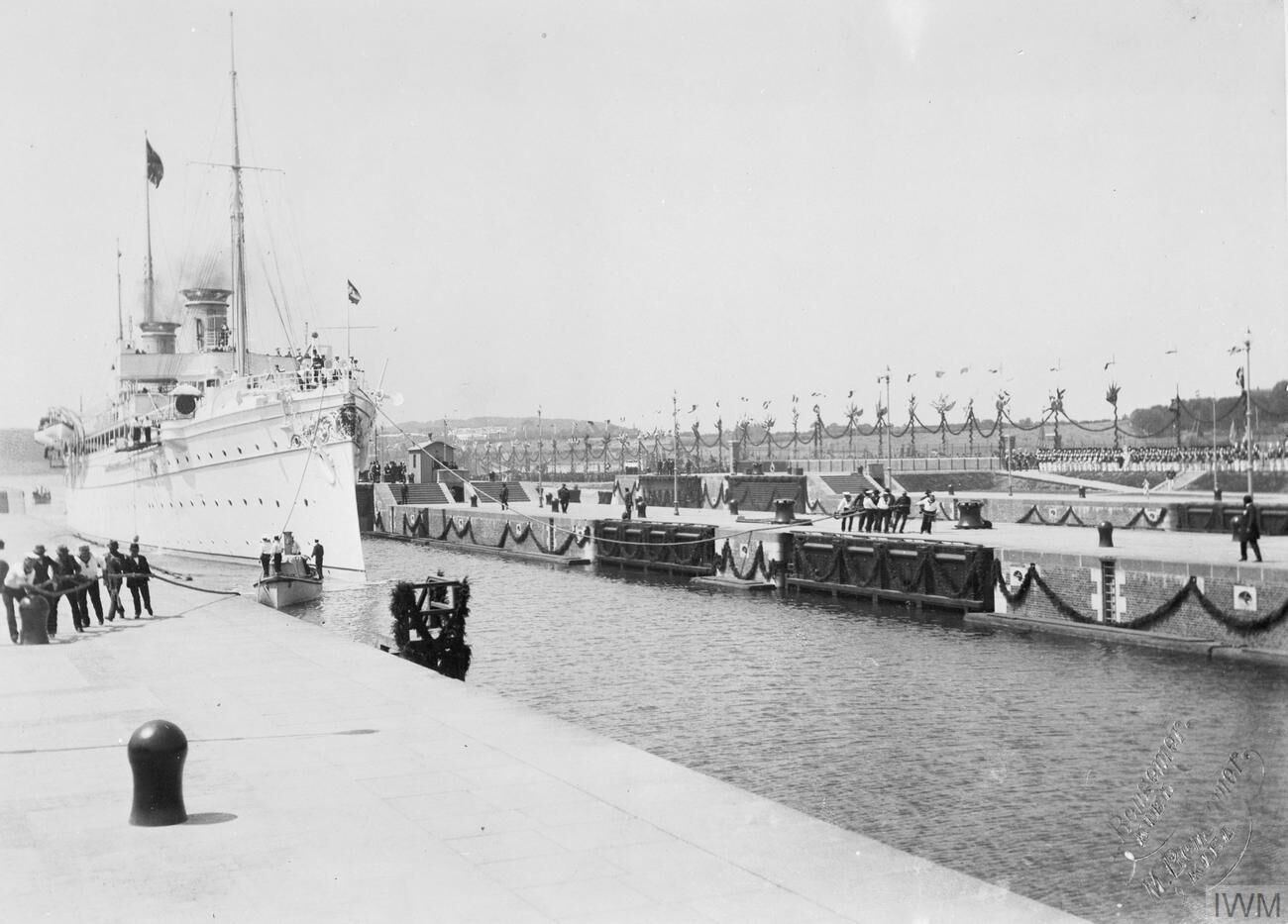
The official opening of the canal with the imperial ship SMY Hohenzollern

In June 1887, construction started at Holtenau, near Kiel. The canal took over 9,000 workers eight years to build. The first vessel to pass through the canal was the aviso SMS Jagd, sent through in late April (before the canal officially opened) to determine if it was ready for use. In May, the tender Otter also passed through the canal. On 20 June 1895, Kaiser Wilhelm II officially opened the canal for transiting from Brunsbüttel to Holtenau. The next day a ceremony took place in Holtenau, where Wilhelm II named the waterway the Kaiser Wilhelm Kanal (after his grandfather, Kaiser Wilhelm I), and laid the final stone. British director Birt Acres filmed the opening of the canal; the Science Museum in London preserves surviving footage of this early film. To cope with the increasing traffic and the demands of the Imperial German Navy, between 1907 and 1914 the canal was widened by Germany to allow dreadnought battleships to pass through, allowing them to travel between the Baltic Sea and the North Sea without having to go around Denmark. Two larger canal locks in Brunsbüttel and Holtenau were installed to complete the enlargement.

The canal as shown in a nautical chart published in 1920

=== After World War I ===
After World War I, the Treaty of Versailles required the canal to be open to vessels of commerce and of war of any nation at peace with Germany, while leaving it under German administration. (The United States opposed this proposal to avoid setting a precedent for similar concessions on the Panama Canal.) The government under Adolf Hitler repudiated its international status in 1936, but the canal was reopened to all traffic after World War II. In 1948, the current name was adopted.

The canal was partially closed for a period in March 2013 after two lock gates failed at the western end near Brunsbüttel. Ships larger than 125 m (410 ft) were forced to navigate via Skagerrak, a 450 km (280 mi) detour. The failure was blamed on neglect and a lack of funding by the German Federal Government, which had been in financial dispute with the state of Schleswig-Holstein regarding the canal. Germany's Federal Transport Ministry promised rapid repairs.

=== Later Expansion ===
The western part of the canal was widened and deepened in projects that took place from 1965 to 2001.

The widening and deepening of the eastern part began in 2020, with the first section between Königsförde and Groß-Nordsee, 4,3 kilometers long, opened on 10 November, 2025. The 44 meters wide stream bed was extended to 70 meters.

Five additional sections are to be expanded.

== Operation ==
The canal is governed by detailed traffic rules. Each vessel using the canal is categorized into one of six traffic groups according to its dimensions. Larger ships are obliged to accept pilots and specialized canal helmsmen, in some cases even the assistance of a tugboat. Furthermore, there are regulations regarding the passing of oncoming ships. Larger ships may also be required to moor at the bollards provided at intervals along the canal to allow the passage of oncoming vessels. Special rules apply to pleasure craft.

All permanent, fixed bridges crossing the canal since its construction have a clearance of 42 m (138 ft).

Maximum length for ships passing the Kiel Canal is 235.50 m (772.6 ft), with the maximum width (beam) of 32.50 m (106.6 ft); these ships can have a draught of up to 7.00 m (22.97 ft). Ships up to a length of 160.00 m (524.93 ft) may have a draught up to 9.50 m (31.2 ft). The bulker Ever Leader (deadweight 74001 t) is considered to be the cargo ship that to date has come closest to the overall limits.

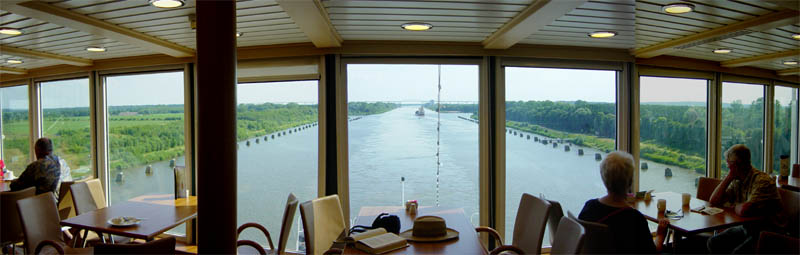
View west-southwest from the aft lounge of the cruise ship Norwegian Dream

== Crossings ==
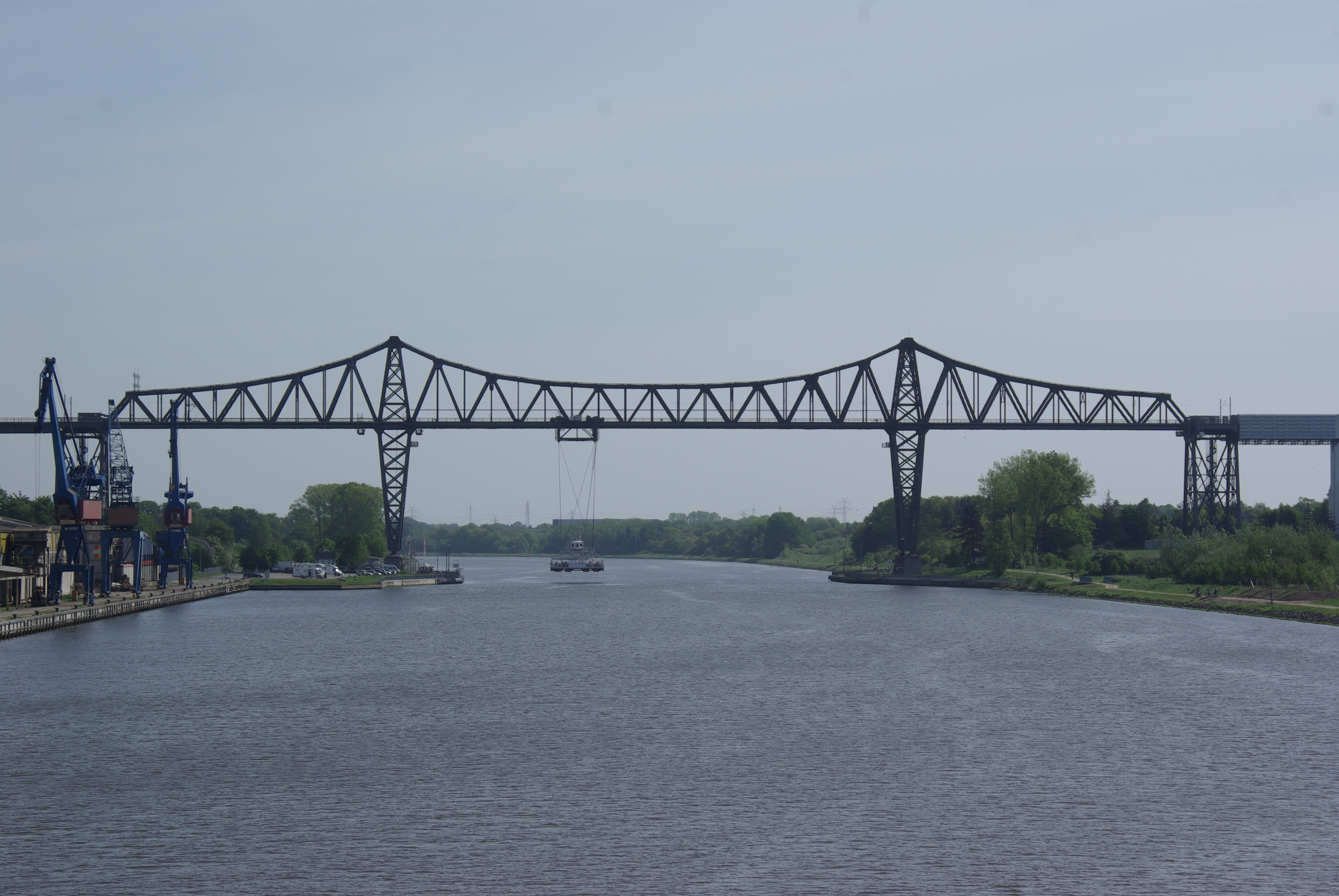
Rendsburg High Bridge

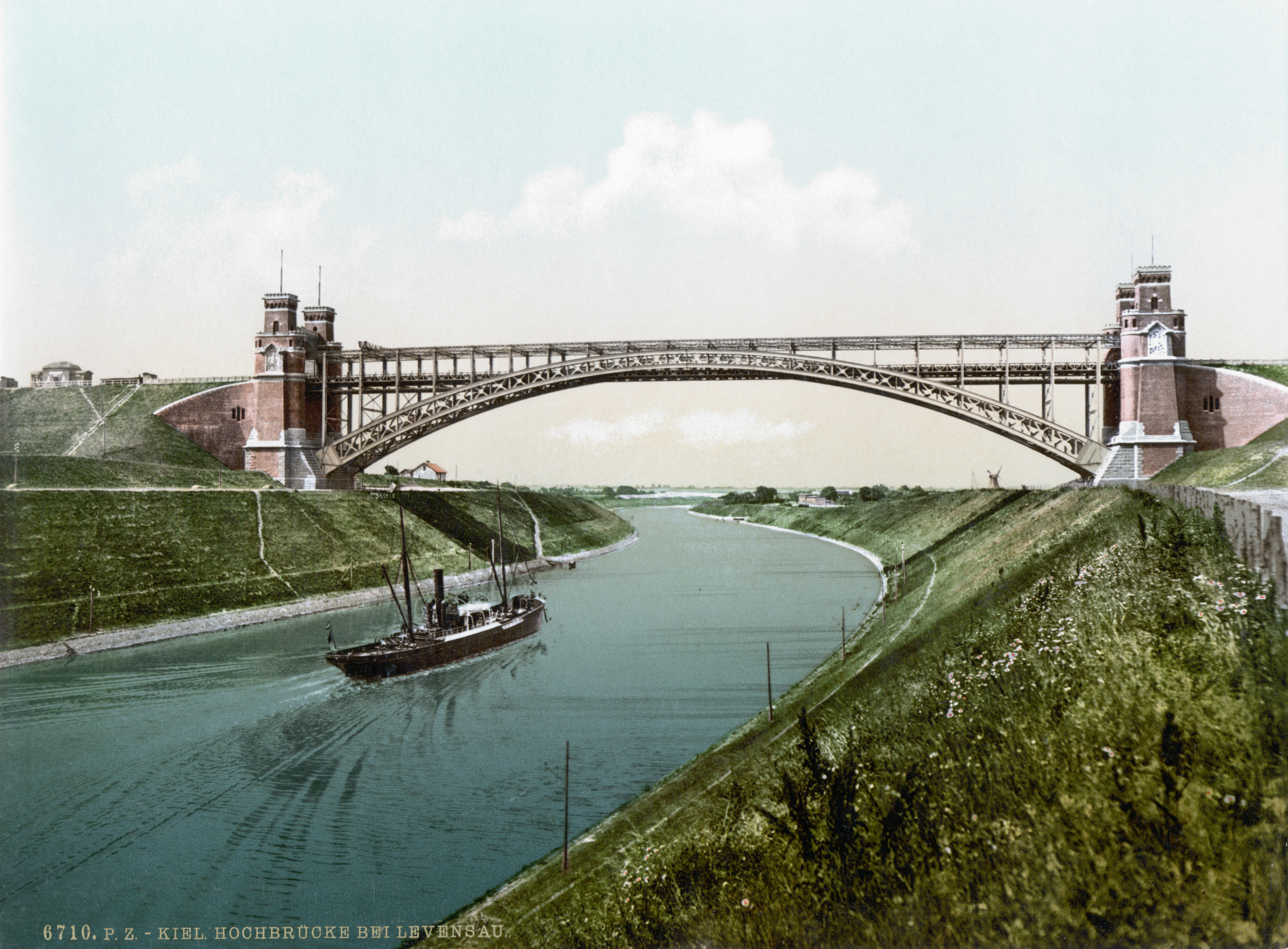
Levensau High Bridge

Several railway lines and federal roads (Autobahnen and Bundesstraßen) cross the canal, on eleven fixed links. The bridges have a clearance of 42 m (138 ft), allowing for ship heights up to 40 m (130 ft). The oldest bridge still in use is the Levensau High Bridge, completed in 1894; however, it will be replaced in the course of a canal expansion already underway. In sequence and in the direction of the official kilometre count from west (Brunsbüttel) to east (Holtenau) these crossings are:

- Brunsbüttel High Bridge, four lane crossing of Bundesstraße 5
- Hochdonn High Bridge of the Marsh Railway
- Hohenhörn High Bridge for Autobahn 23
- Grünental High Bridge for railway line Neumünster-Heide and Bundesstraße 204
- Rendsburg High Bridge for the Neumünster–Flensburg railway, from which a transporter bridge, used by local traffic, is suspended
- Kanaltunnel Rendsburg, road tunnel for Bundesstraße 77 (four lanes)
- Rendsburg pedestrian tunnel
- Rade High Bridge for Autobahn A7
- Levensau High Bridge, completed in 1894 for the Kiel–Flensburg railway and a local road
- New Levensau High Bridge for Bundesstraße 76 (four lanes)
- Holtenau High Bridges, two parallel bridges with three car lanes each as well as pavements for pedestrians and cyclists

Local traffic is also served by 14 ferry lines. Most noteworthy is the “hanging ferry” (German: Schwebefähre, literally: "hovering ferry") that is hanging underneath the Rendsburg High Bridge. This hanging ferry was replaced after a collision with a ship in 2016, and returned to service in 2022. All ferries are run by the Canal Authority and their use is free of charge.

== See also ==
- List of canals in Germany
