= Dithmarscher Eiderwatt =

Coordinates: 54°16′30″N 8°55′20″E

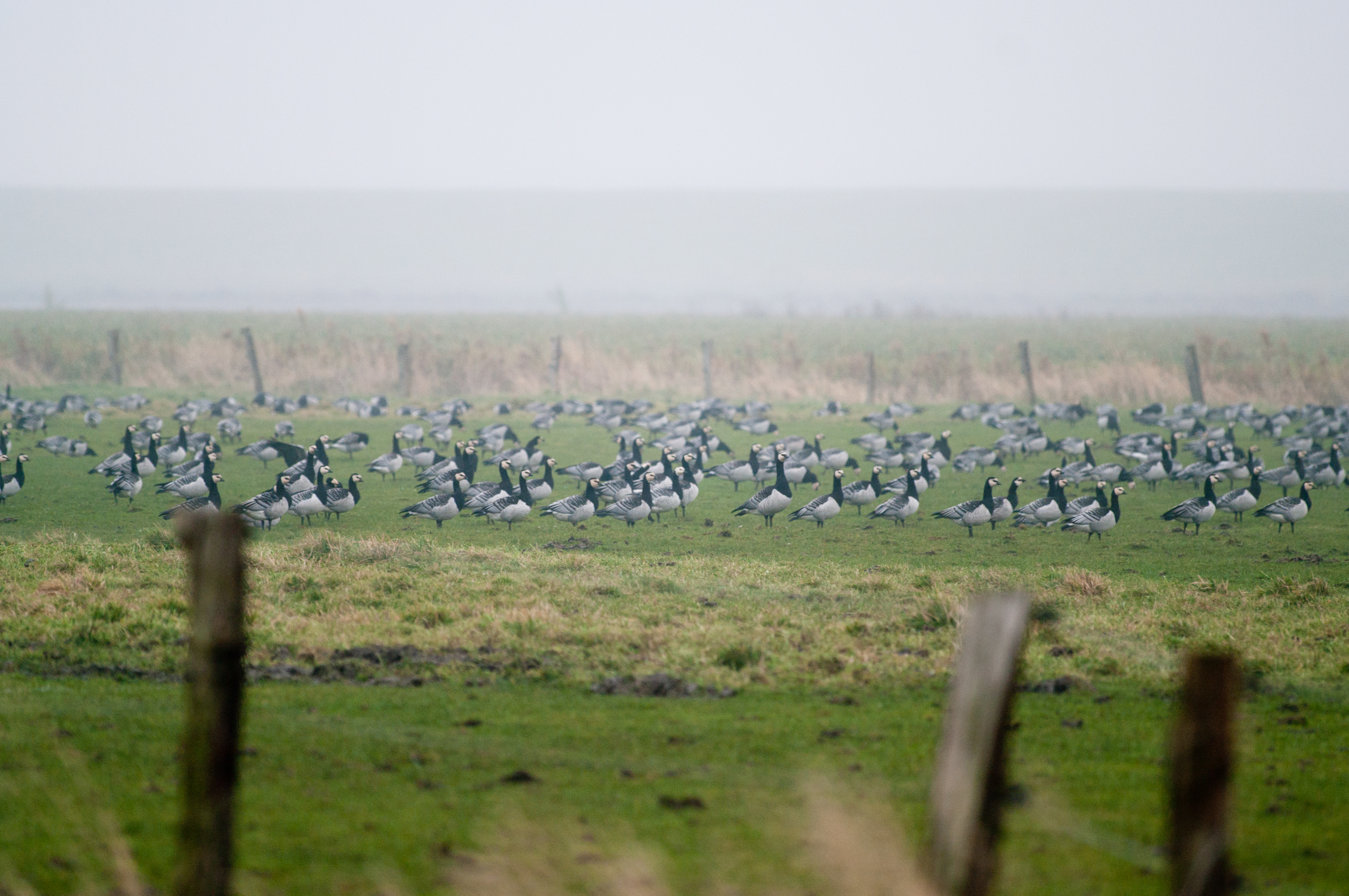
Flock of Barnacle geese at the nature reserve

The Dithmarscher Eiderwatt, officially the Dithmarscher Eidervorland mit Watt ("Dittmarschen Eider Foreland and Watt"), is a nature reserve in the districts of Dithmarschen and Nordfriesland in the north German state of Schleswig-Holstein. The site has an area of 620 hectares (1,500 acres) which consists of the mudflats on the tidal current of the river Eider.

The nature reserve is mainly located on the Dithmarschen side of the Eider foreland, from the Eider Barrage to the Eider bridge on the B 5 federal highway near Tönning. It lies within the municipal boundaries of the villages of Wesselburenerkoog and Karolinenkoog, and partly in Tönning (Nordfriesland). On the North Frisian side of the river lies the Katinger Watt area.

The reserve was based on the considerably smaller (19.4 hectares (48 acres)) nature reserve known as the Schülper Neuensiel Bird Reserve which existed from 1930 to 1989. The reserve was expanded in order to moderate the environmental effects of the Eider Barrage which had destroyed large areas of mudflat and salt meadows in the tidal stream of the river Eider and led to a significant reduction in birds of passage.
In section 3 of the nature conservation order it states: "The nature reserve enables the retention of a wet area in the tidal saltwaters and brackish waters of the Eider estuary and its mudflat and foreland areas and the conservation of animal and plant habitats typical of such areas, particularly for the wading and water birds that breed here or pass through on migration as well as the invertebrates occurring here."

According to the count of breeding birds by NABU, a German nature conservation organisation, in 2006 a total of 35 species (2165 pairs) breed in the reserve. If manmade areas are included, such as around the Eider Barrage, the port of Schülperneuensiel and the Eider bridge, the number rises to 43. Dominant species, with at least 5% of the population, were the black-headed gull (22.2%), avocet (13.9%), lapwing (10.3%), oystercatcher (9.6%), redshank (9.1%), meadow pipit (6.5%) and mallard (5.7%). Subdominant species were the skylark (4.6%), reed bunting (4.2%) and Arctic tern (2.4%); followed by the gadwall (1.9%), shelduck (1.2%) and yellow wagtail (1.3%).

== Sources ==
- Landesamt für Natur und Umwelt des Landes Schleswig-Holstein (Hrsg): einzigartig – Naturführer durch Schleswig Holstein, Wachholtz Verlag, Neumünster 2008, ISBN 978-3-529-05415-0
