= Katinger Watt =

Coordinates: 54°17′14″N 8°54′02″E

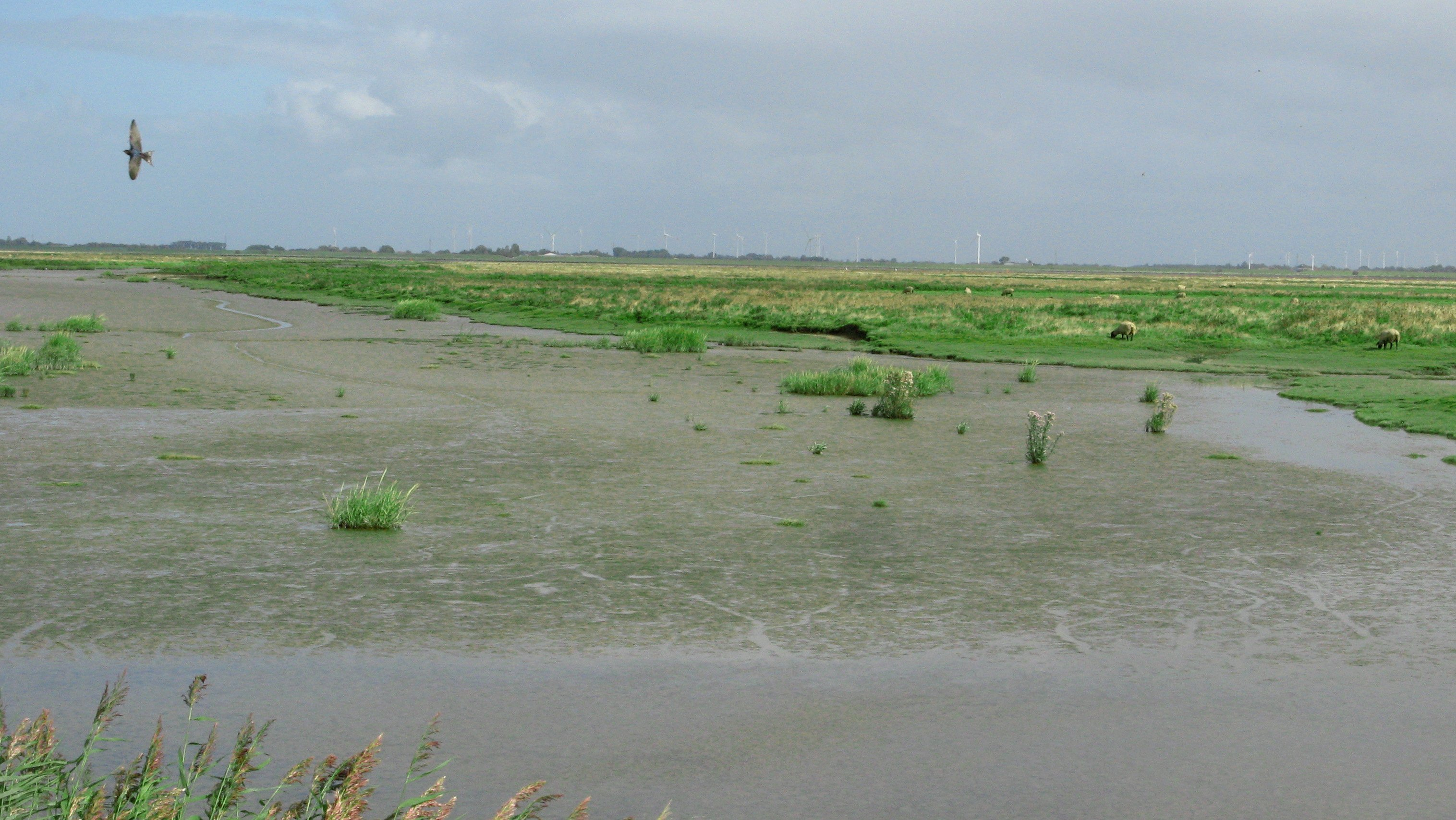
Katinger Priel

The Katinger Watt is an area near Kating (a village in the municipality of Tönning) in the south of the Eiderstedt peninsula in the north German state of Schleswig-Holstein which is partly maintained by the German Nature and Biodiversity Conservation Union, NABU. The Katinger Watt is part of two larger protected areas, of the Ramsar site Schleswig-Holstein Wadden Sea and adjacent areas and of a similarly named SPA.

Once a region of mudflats in the estuary of the river Eider, it was drained as part of land reclamation activity and protected from flooding by the Eider Barrage. Today a third of it is farmed, the rest is a mix of woodland and bodies of water. On the far (opposite) bank of the Eider lies the nature reserve of Dithmarscher Eiderwatt, which was created in 1989 in order to moderate the ecological consequences of the Eider Barrage.
