= Eider Barrage =

Coastal protection structure in Germany

Coordinates: 54°15′51.7″N 8°50′43.7″E

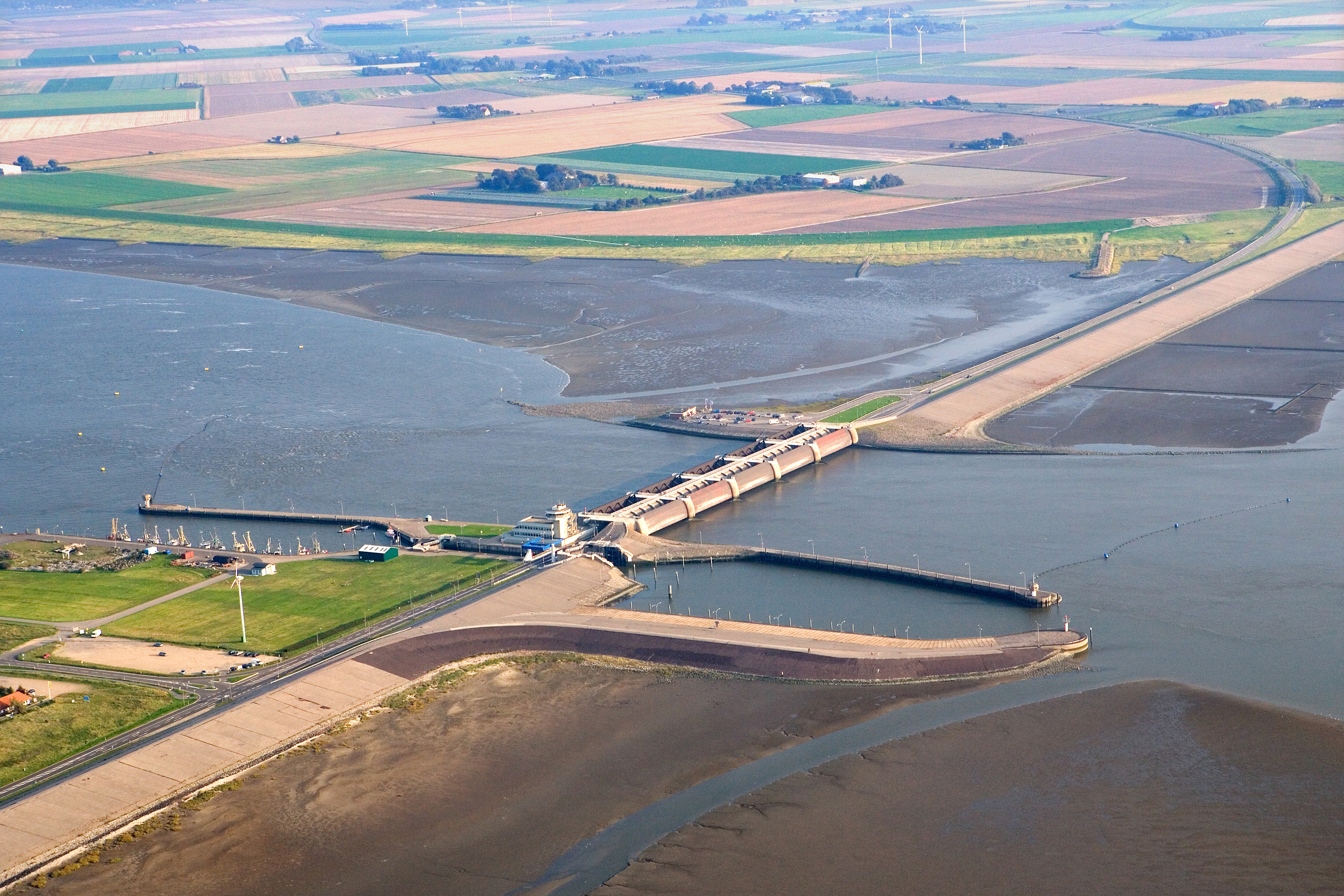
The Eider Barrage, seaward side.

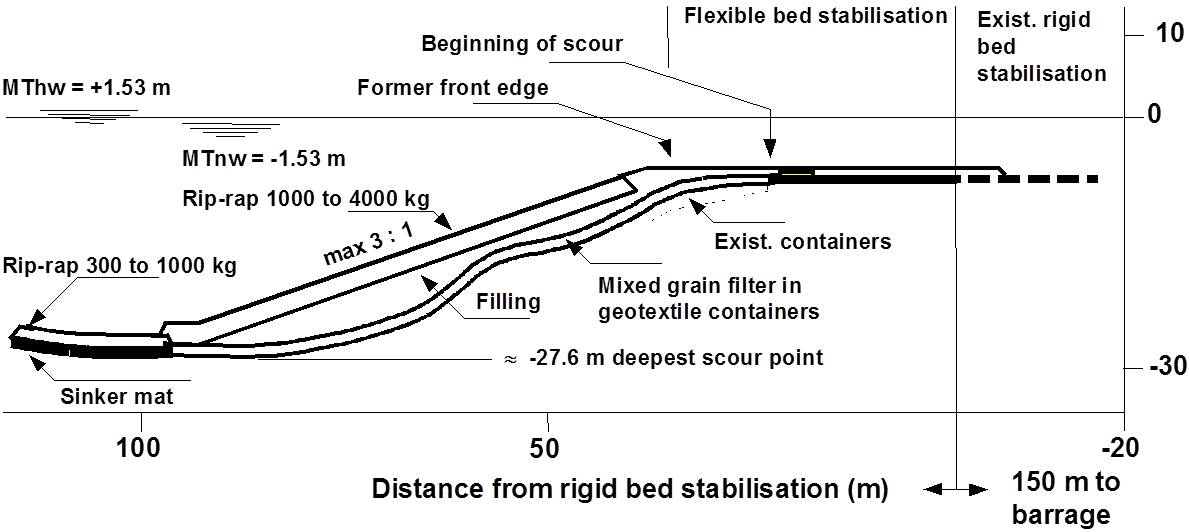
Scheme of the bed stabilization at the seaward side (left) realised in 1993. The barrage is 150 m to the right. M Thw = mean high tide water level.

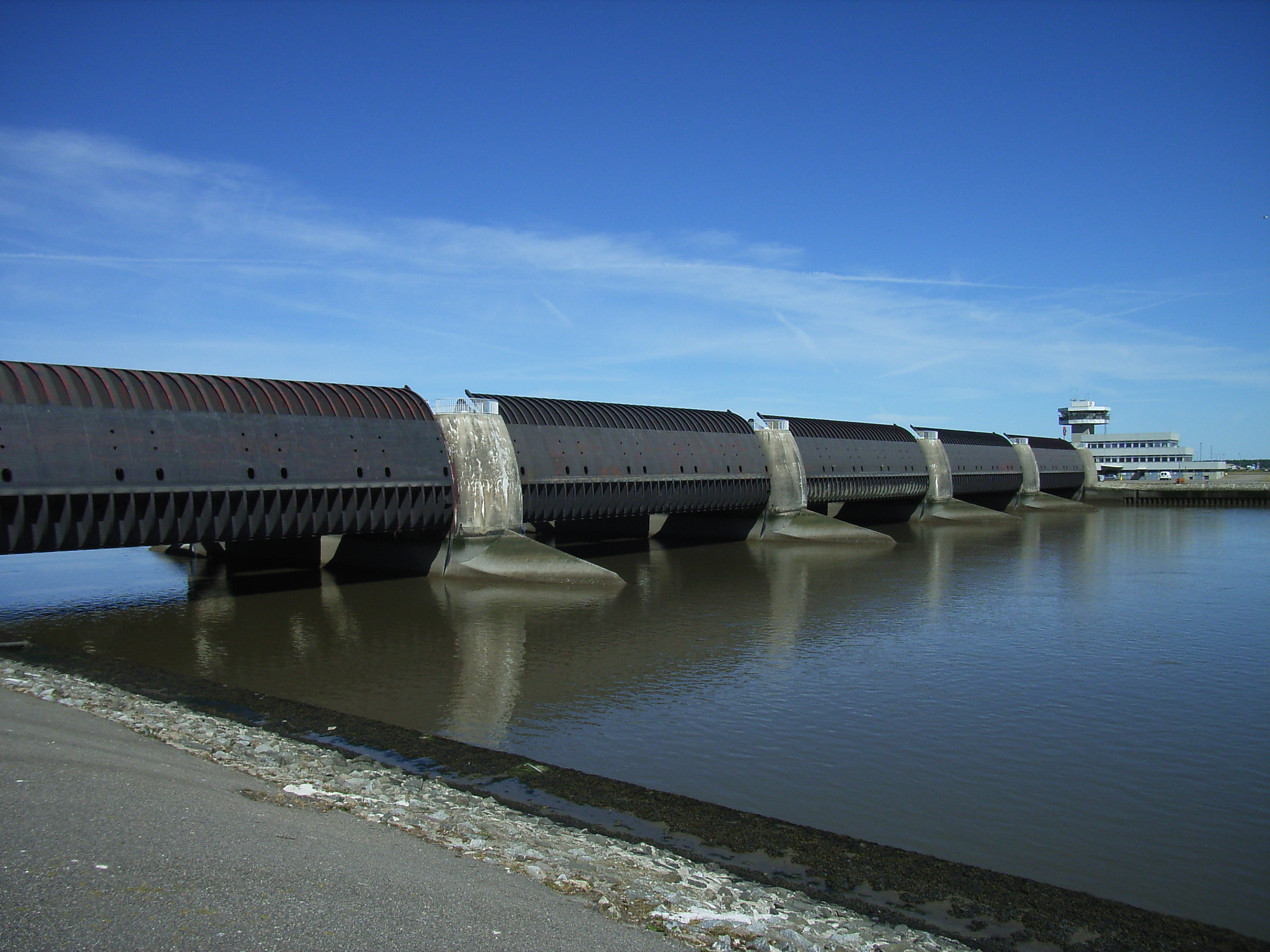
Eider Barrage, landward side, open

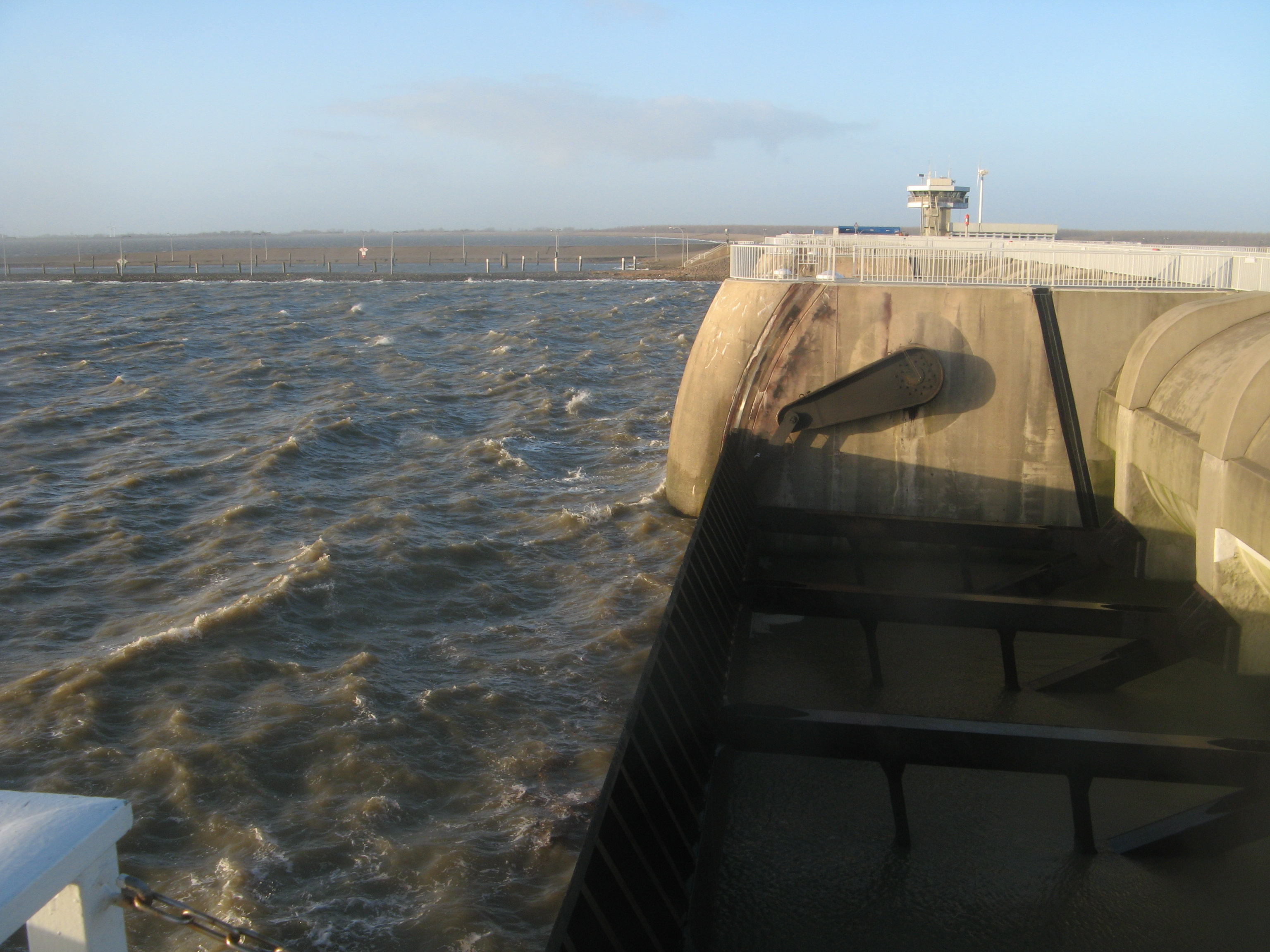
Eider Barrage, seaward side, closed

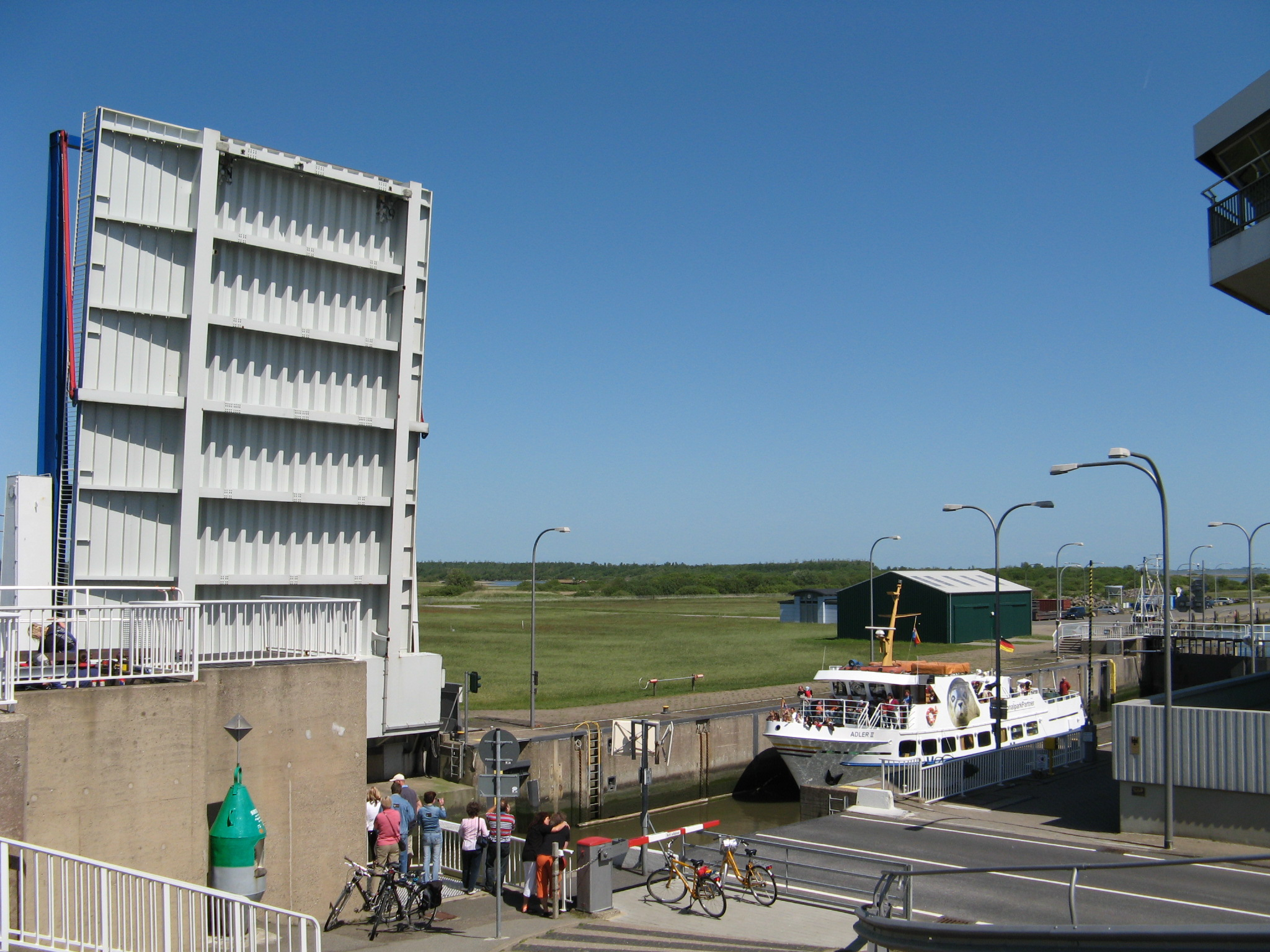
Bridge and lock opened

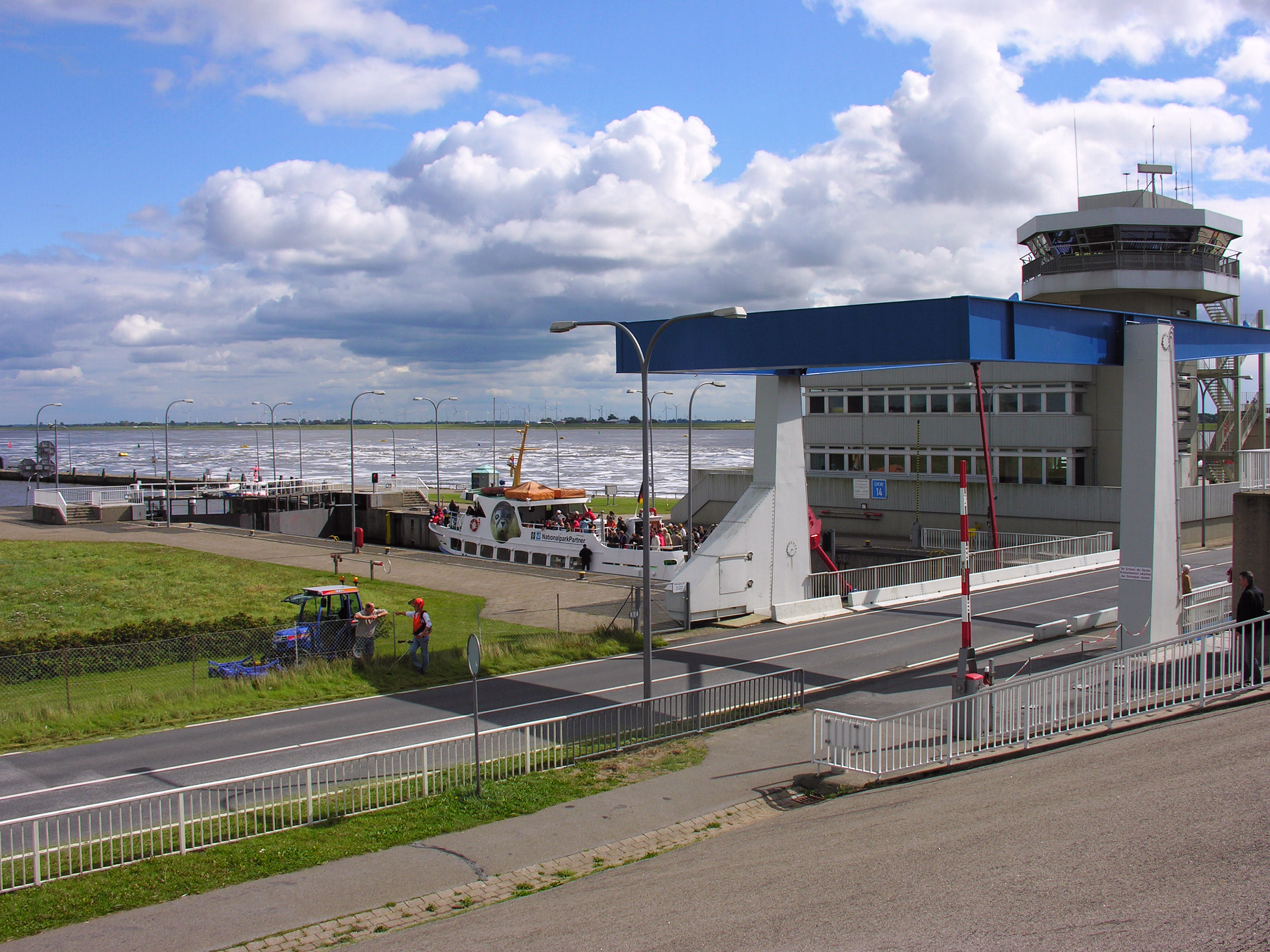
Eider barrage river side from the north, with control tower and street crossing lock and river

The Eider Barrage (German: Eidersperrwerk) is located at the mouth of the river Eider near Tönning on Germany's North Sea coast. Its main purpose is to protect against storm surges from the North Sea. It is Germany's largest coastal protection structure. It was also intended to contribute to economic recovery in the districts of Norderdithmarschen (today part of Dithmarschen) and Eiderstedt (today part of Nordfriesland).

Celebrated as a structure of the century, it was opened on 20 March 1973. Following the North Sea flood of 1962 which swept through Tönning, consideration was given to raising the dykes along the banks of the Eider or building a storm surge barrier at its mouth. The latter was chosen and construction work began in 1967. The current conditions in the estuary caused great difficulties and the cost of construction was correspondingly high (ca. 170 million DM = ca. 87 million euros). The line of dykes in the Eider region was shortened from 60 km to 4.8 km. The new current conditions however dug a new hole about 30 metres deep directly in front of the dyke and lock which had to be filled in during the 1980s with 20,000 sandbags.

From April to August 1993 the seaward side was reinforced with ca. 48,000 geotextile containers (sand bags made of a special material) at a rate of ca. 700 containers per day. The installation was exemplary with less than 10 containers damaged in the process. This was achieved by the use nonwoven containers, which are significantly more damage-resistant than the more conventional woven containers.

The barrage comprises two separate rows each of five gates. The site was laid out in such a way as to guarantee the level of protection of a double dyke. Between the gates a road runs through, protected by a 236 metre long tunnel. Above the tunnel is a footpath, which offers a good view of the west coast and the river Eider. Also equipped with double gates is a lock incorporated into the barrage for shipping. Including the newly built dyke, the barrage is 4.9 kilometres long, lies 8.5 metres above sea level and 7 metres above the average high tide. Five gates, each 40 metres long, allow the water of the Eider to flow into the North Sea when the tide ebbs, and North Sea water into the Eider when it flows. Nearby is a 75 metre long and 14 metre wide lift lock (Kammerschleuse), through which ships pass into the North Sea from the adjacent harbour.

Today the barrage is also a tourist attraction as they travel through Eiderstedt with its seaside resorts of Sankt Peter-Ording and Vollerwiek or the resort of Garding. The construction of the barrage resulted in the old Eider estuary becoming the Katinger Watt nature reserve; on the opposite side of the river in 1989 the Dithmarscher Eiderwatt was established in order to at least partially compensate for the losses of salt meadows and mudflats caused by the building of the barrage. Many fishing smacks were moved from Tönning to the fishing port by the barrage which was closer to the fishing grounds. At the barrage itself there is a large breeding colony of Arctic terns with 143 breeding pairs in 2006.

The barrage is also the closing scene of the 1977 Wim Wenders film The American Friend.
