= Gieselau Canal =

Canal in Germany

Coordinates: 54.184147°N 9.440914°E

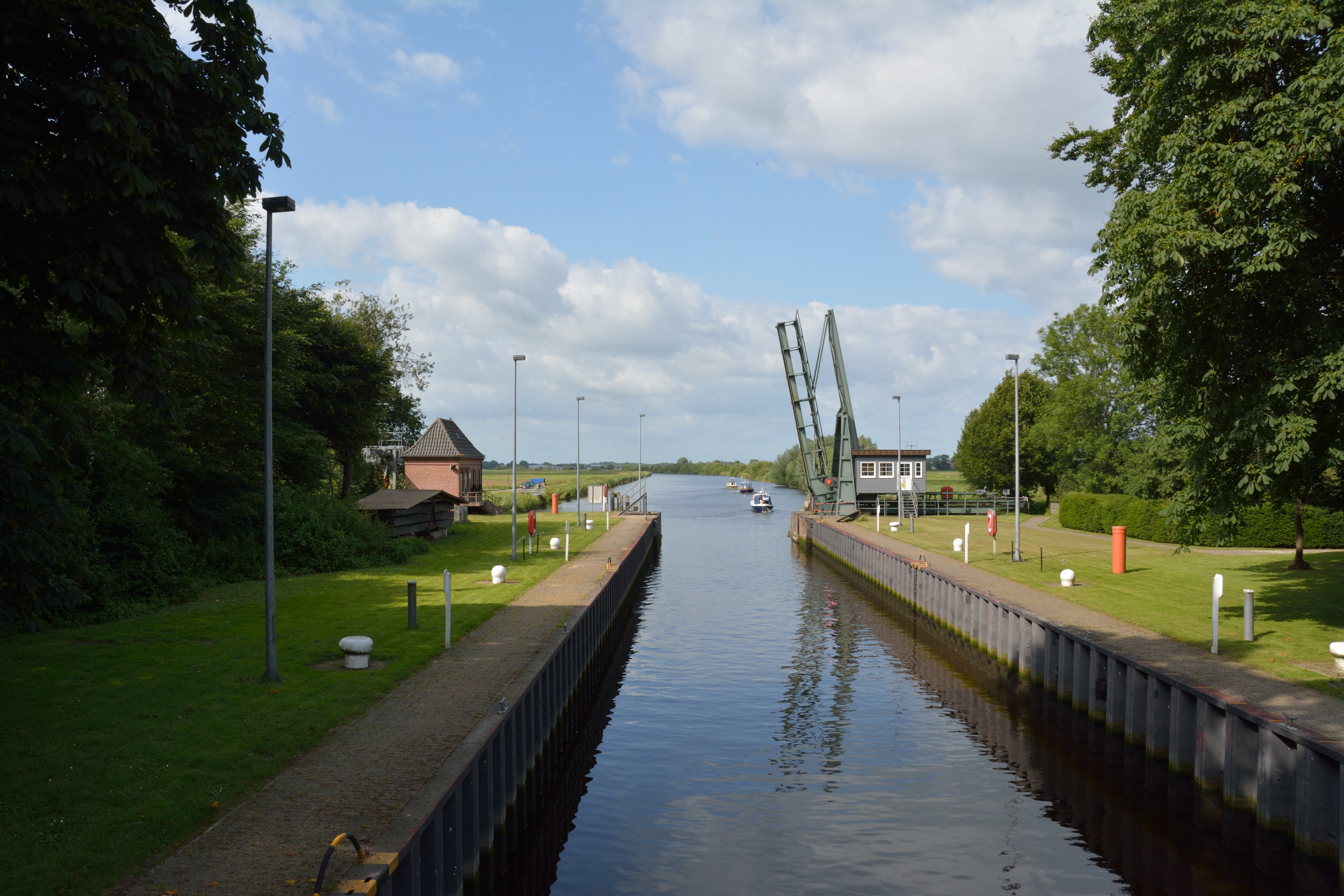

The Gieselau Canal, or Gieselaukanal in German, is a canal in the German state of Schleswig-Holstein. It is near Oldenbüttel and links the Kiel Canal with the River Eider.

The canal has a length of 2.9 kilometres (1.8 mi) and has a single lock, with a fall of between 0.2 metres (7.9 in) and 1.6 metres (5 ft 3 in).
