= Schulensee =

Lake in Molfsee, Schleswig-Holstein, Germany

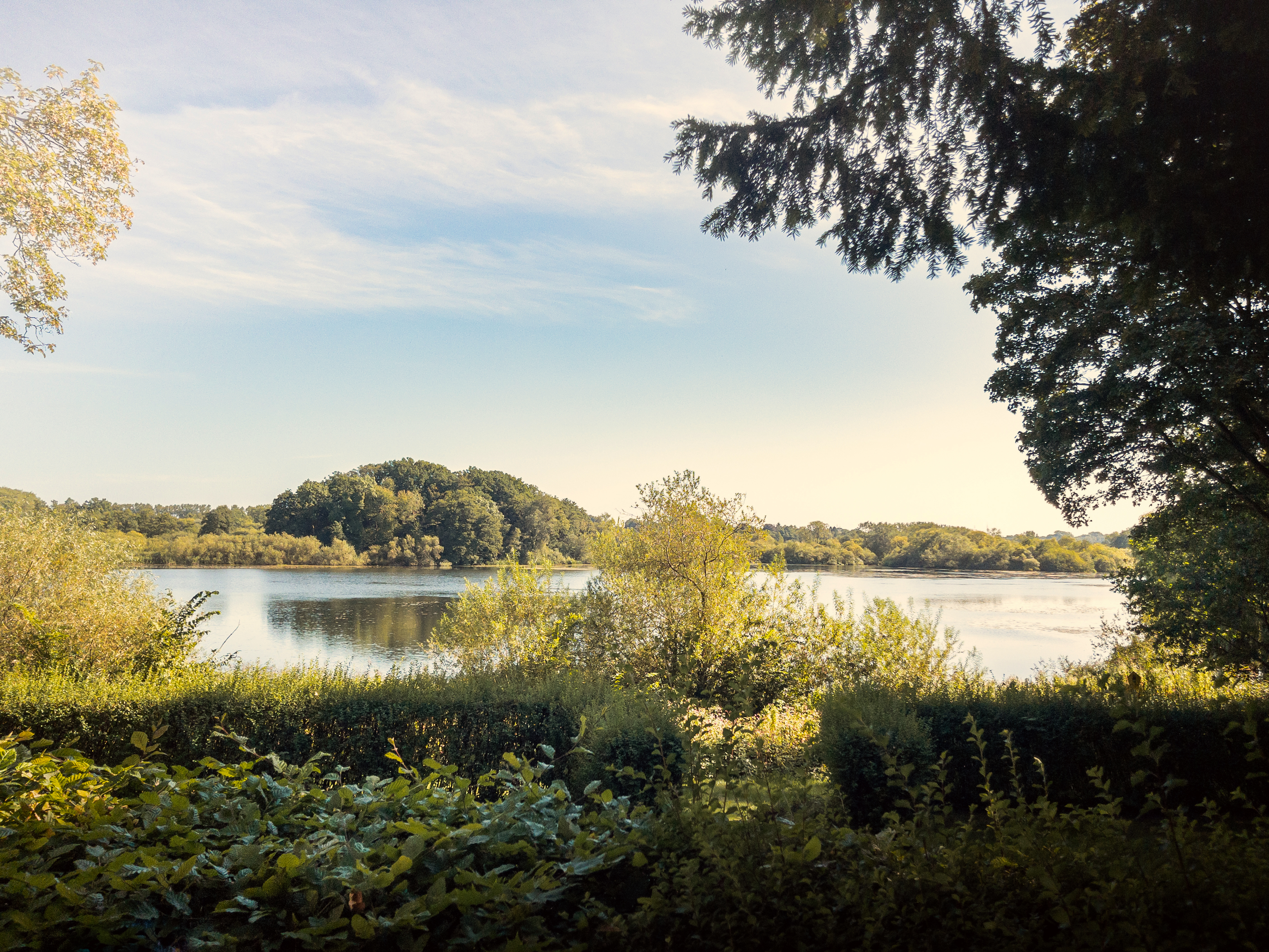

- Location within Schleswig-Holstein
- Location: Schleswig-Holstein
- Coordinates: 54°17′11″N 10°5′36″E
- Primary inflows: Eider
- Primary outflows: Eider
- Basin countries: Germany
- Surface area: 0.13 km^{2} (0.050 sq mi)
- Max. depth: 2 m (6 ft 7 in)
- Surface elevation: 11 m (36 ft)
- Settlements: Kiel

Schulensee is a lake in Schleswig-Holstein, Germany. At an elevation of 11 m, its surface area is 0.13 km^{2}.
