= Wesenberg Castle =

- Burg Wesenberg
- Wesenberg, Mecklenburg-Vorpommern
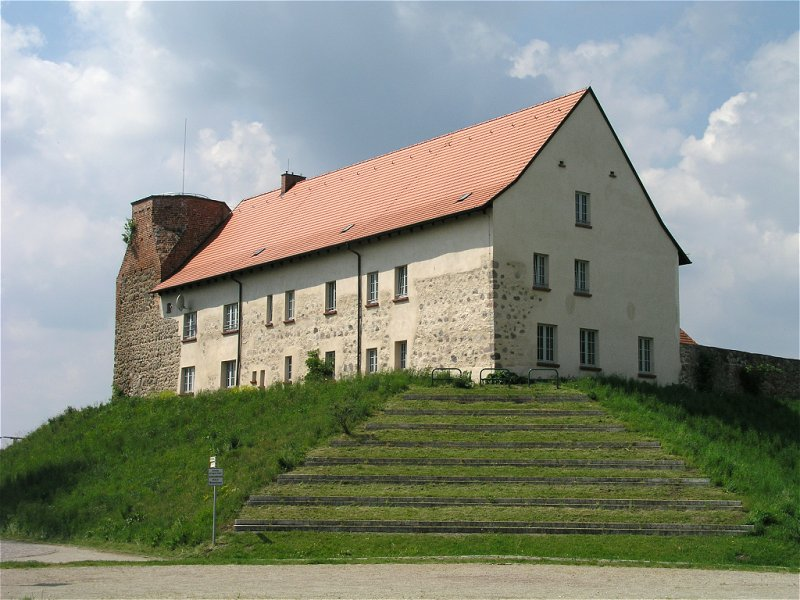
- Wesenberg Castle

Site information
- Type: Motte-and-bailey castle
- Open to the public: Yes

Location
- Location in Germany
- Coordinates: 53.280556°N 12.9725°E

Site history
- Built: 13th century
- Built by: Nicholas I of Werle

Wesenberg Castle (German: Burg Wesenberg) is a motte-and-bailey castle in Wesenberg, Mecklenburg-Vorpommern (Germany).

Of the original castle, only the bergfried tower and an adjacent part of the former ring wall survives. The castle was founded by Nicholas I of Werle during the middle of the 13th century, as protection for the city of Wesenberg. Among other things, the castle served as a residence for the widow of Duke Ulrich II of Mecklenburg-Stargard, Catherine. The castle was largely destroyed by a fire in 1630. Today, the castle is owned by the city of Wesenberg and since 1950 it houses the offices of the local forestry administration.
