= Ruhr Ship Canal =

The Ruhr Ship Canal (German: Ruhrschifffahrtskanal) is a canal in the German state of North Rhine-Westphalia built in 1927. It links the River Rhine at Duisburg to the city of Mülheim an der Ruhr.
