= Kammer Canal =

Canal in Mecklenburg-Vorpommern, Germany

Coordinates: 53°19′51″N 13°02′05″E

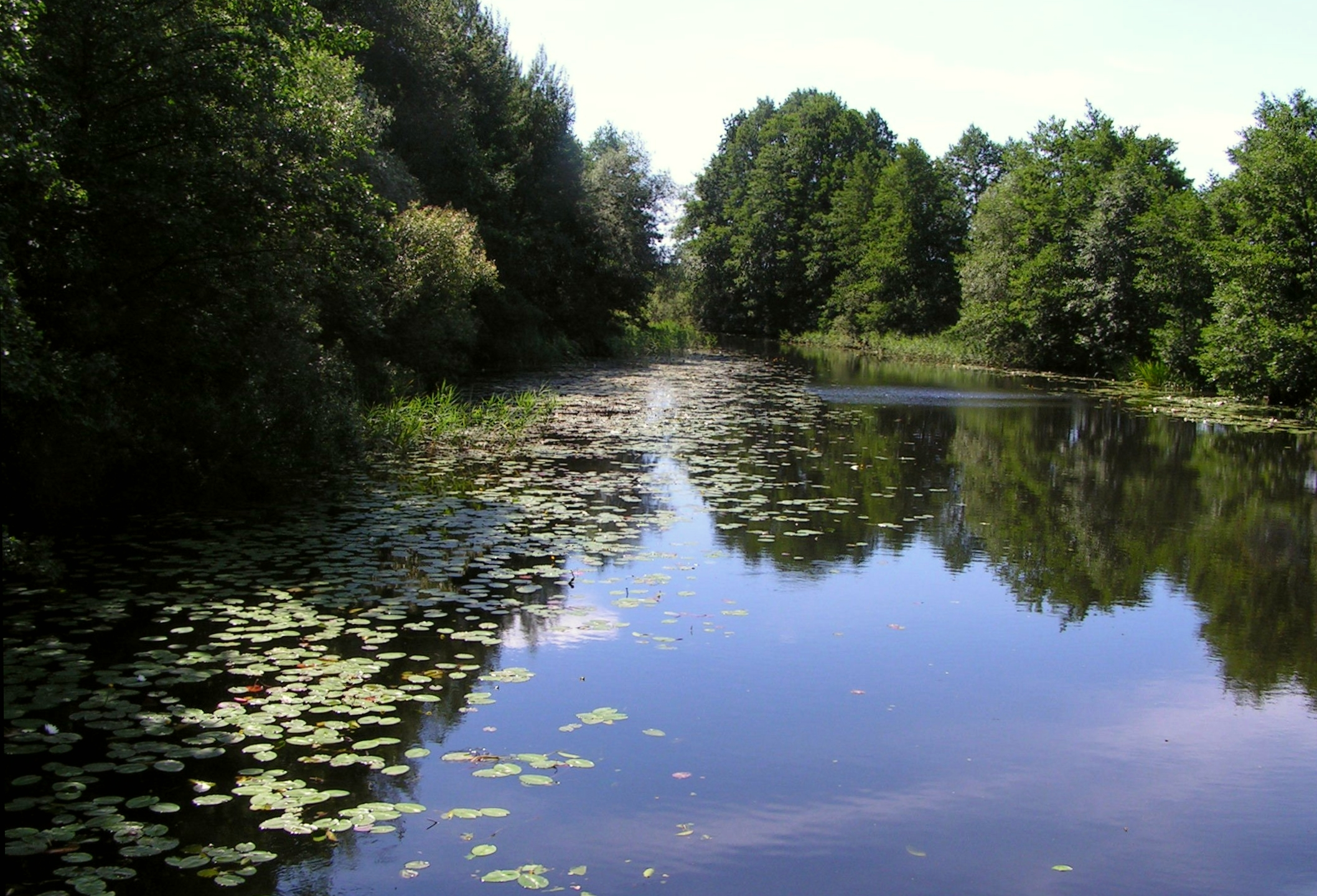
The Kammer Canal at Vosswinkel

The Kammer Canal, or Kammerkanal in German, is a canal in the German state of Mecklenburg-Vorpommern. It links the lakes of Woblitzsee and Zierker See, thus providing a navigable route between the River Havel, which flows through the Woblitzsee, and the town of Neustrelitz, which is on the Zierker See.

The canal has a length of 5.2 kilometres (3.2 mi) and has a single lock at Vosswinkel, with a vertical rise of 1.8 metres (5 ft 11 in). It is administered as part of the Obere–Havel–Wasserstraße.
