= Woblitzsee =

Lake in Mecklenburg-Vorpommern, Germany

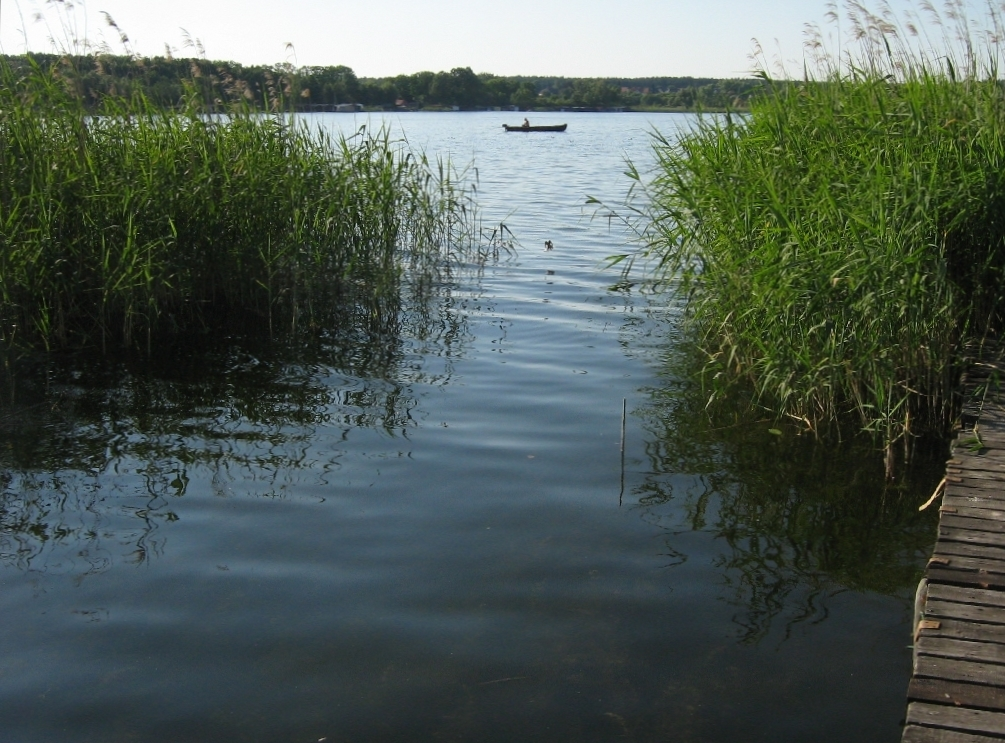

- Location within Mecklenburg-Vorpommern
- Location: Mecklenburgische Seenplatte, Mecklenburg-Vorpommern
- Coordinates: 53.29694°N 12.99416°E
- Primary inflows: River Havel, Kammer Canal, Floßgraben
- Primary outflows: River Havel
- Basin countries: Germany
- Surface area: 5.2 square kilometres (2.0 sq mi)
- Average depth: 1.6 metres (5 ft 3 in)
- Max. depth: 6.9 metres (23 ft)
- Surface elevation: 57.4 metres (188 ft)
- Settlements: Wesenberg

Woblitzsee is a lake in the Mecklenburg Lake District, in Germany. It is situated in the district of Mecklenburgische Seenplatte of the state of Mecklenburg-Vorpommern. The town of Wesenberg can be found at the south-west end of the lake.

The lake has an elevation of 57.4 metres (188 ft) and a surface area of 5.2 square kilometres (2.0 sq mi).

The navigable River Havel flows through the Woblitzsee, entering via a channel from the Großer Labussee. The river exits the lake at Wesenburg via a 7.2 kilometres (4.5 mi) channel to the Wangnitzsee. The Kammer Canal also connects to the Woblitzsee, allowing vessels to reach the Zierker See and Neustrelitz. The lake is navigable between these three entrances, and navigation is administered as part of the Obere–Havel–Wasserstraße.
