= Küsten Canal =

Coordinates: 52°57′42″N 7°18′14″E

- Interactive map of Küsten Canal

Specifications
- Length: 70 km (43 mi)

History
- Construction began: 1922
- Date completed: 1935

Geography
- Start point: Hunte at Oldenburg, Germany
- End point: Dortmund–Ems Canal near Dörpen, Germany

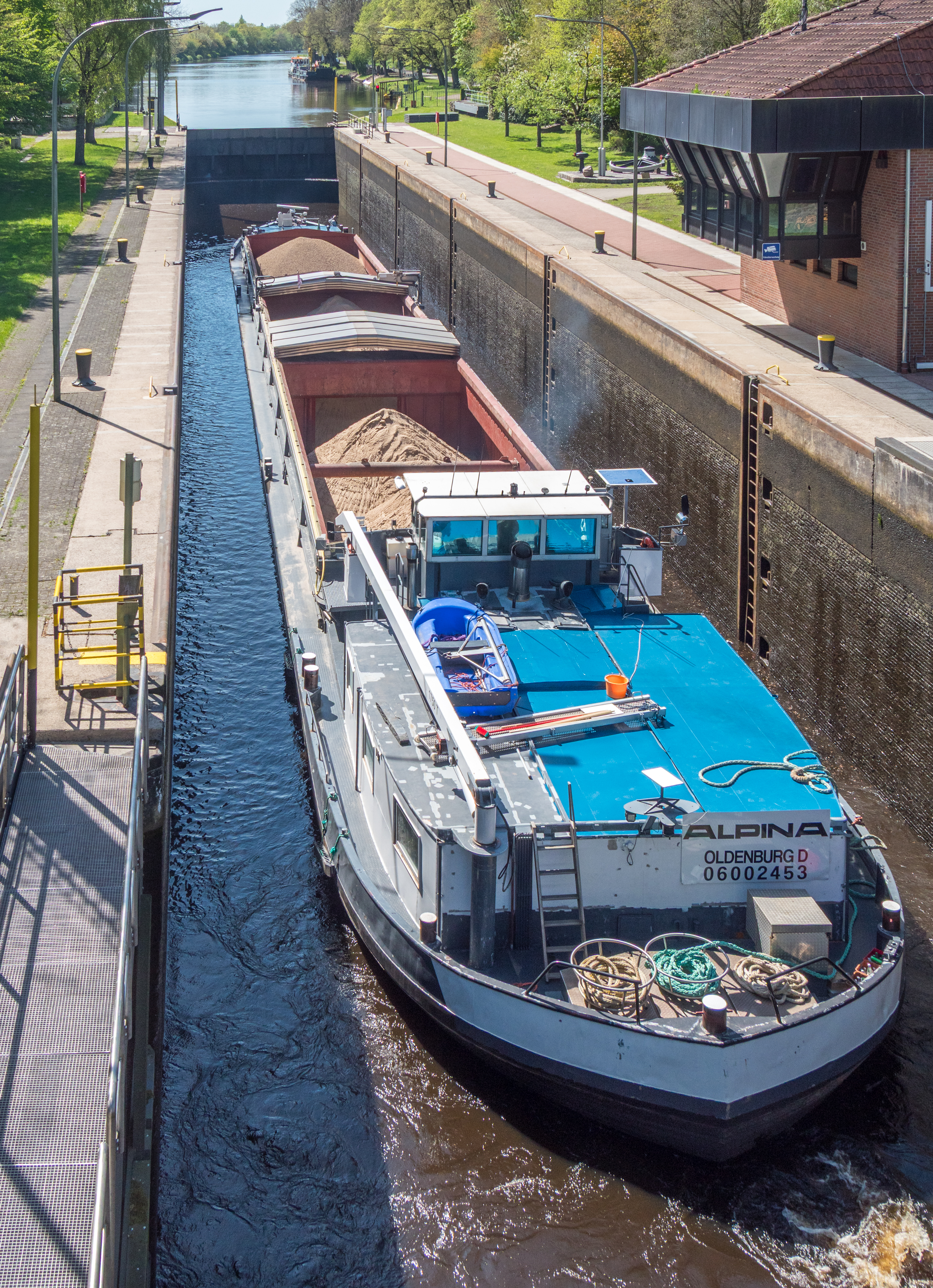
Oldenburg lock

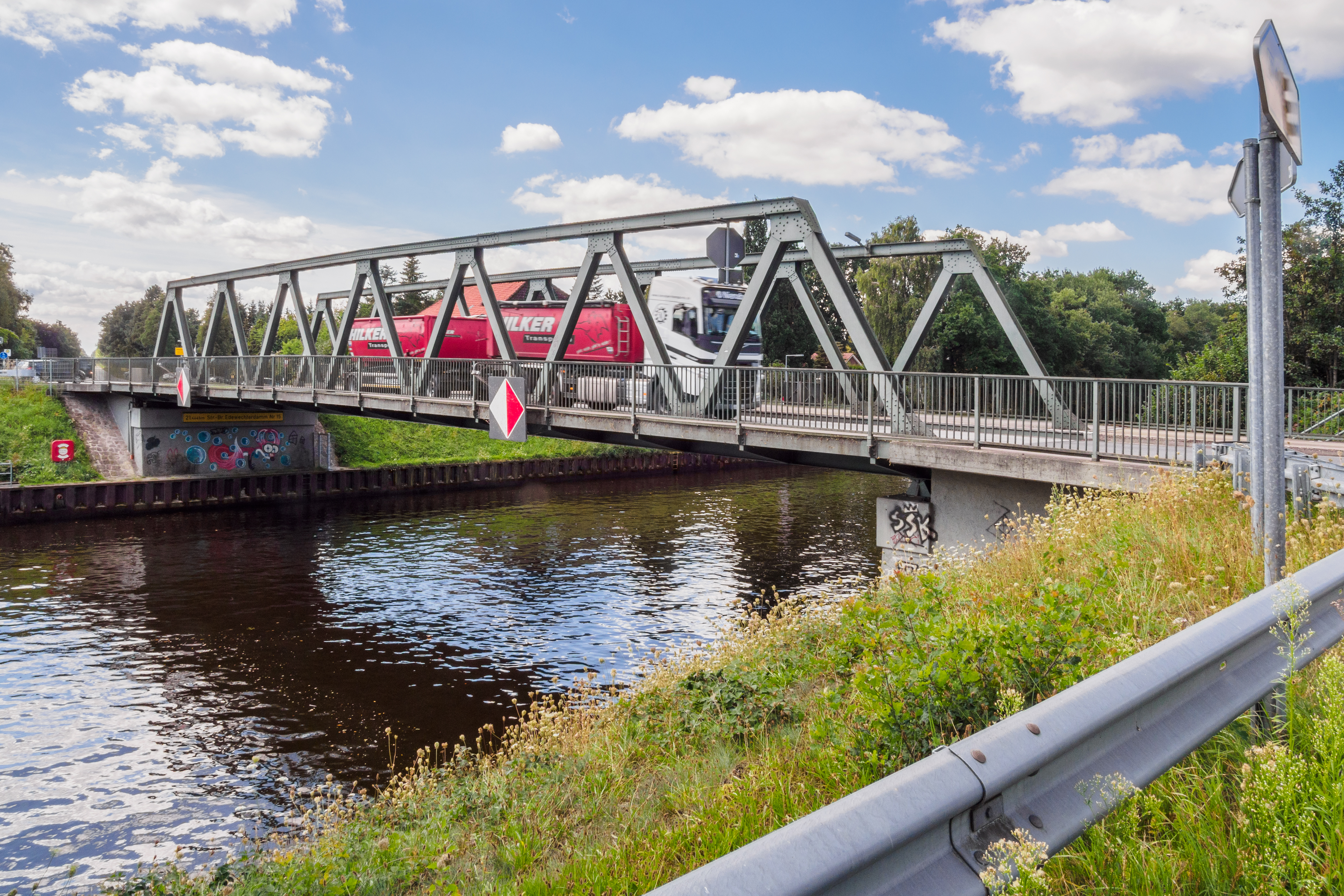
Edewechterdamm bridge in 2025

The Küsten Canal, also known as the Coastal Canal (German: Küstenkanal), is a canal, about 70 kilometres (43 mi) long, that links the Dortmund–Ems Canal with the Hunte and thus the Weser rivers.

It was built from 1922 to 1935 by widening an already existing drainage channel and is used today, especially by the peat industry and for transporting coal from the Ruhrgebiet to Bremen.

== History ==
In April 1945, the 100-metre (330 ft) wide canal was a significant obstacle to Allied forces advancing from the Ems estuary into Germany.

Forces of the 4th Canadian (Armoured) Division assaulted over the canal on 19 April and secured a bridgehead at Edewechterdamm, after Polish formations of the 1st Armoured Division had taken over the previous Canadian position at Dörpen, 50 km. to the West. The Polish forces established a bridgehead towards Papenburg after two days of fierce fighting.

"Küsten Canal" was awarded as a battle honour to both Canadian and Polish units participating in actions near this canal: To the Canadian British Columbia Regiment, Argyll and Sutherland Highlanders of Canada (Princess Louise's), Algonquin Regiment, Lake Superior Scottish Regiment, Lincoln and Welland Regiment, and Royal New Brunswick Regiment, and to the Polish 9th Light Infantry Battalion, 1st Light Anti-Air Artillery Regiment, and 2nd Motorized Artillery Regiment.

== Data ==
- Length: 69.63 kilometres (43.27 mi)
- Water depth: 3.50 metres (11.5 ft)
- Bridge clearance: 4.50 metres (14.8 ft)
- Category IV inland waterway

== Route ==
Ems near Dörpen – southern Papenburg – northern Friesoythe – Hunte in Oldenburg

In many places the canal runs parallel to the B 401.

== See also ==
c-Port, an association and trading estate on the canal.
