= Wesenberg, Mecklenburg-Vorpommern =

Town in Mecklenburg-Vorpommern, Germany

Wesenberg
- Town
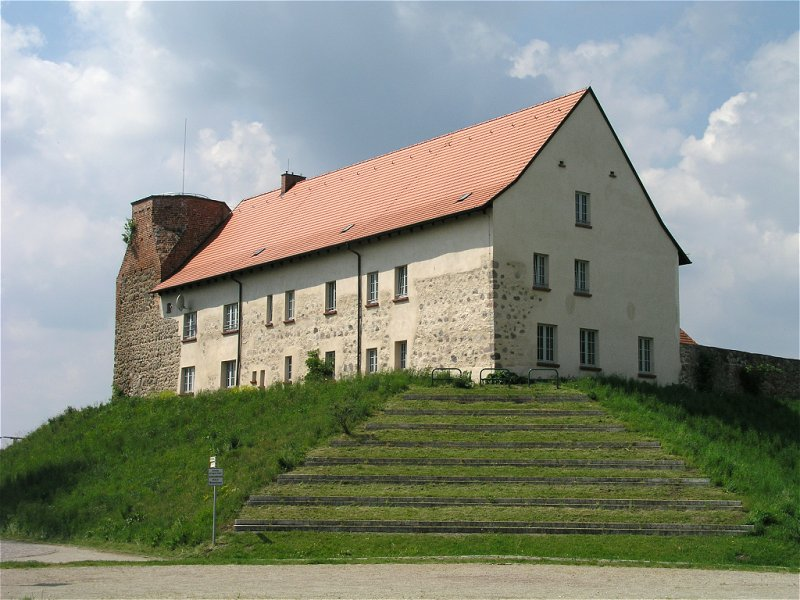
- Wesenberg Castle

- Coat of arms

- Location of Wesenberg within Mecklenburgische Seenplatte district
- Interactive map of Wesenberg
- Location within Germany Location within Mecklenburg-Vorpommern
- Coordinates: 53°16′N 12°58′E
- Country: Germany
- State: Mecklenburg-Vorpommern
- District: Mecklenburgische Seenplatte
- Municipal assoc.: Mecklenburgische Kleinseenplatte

Government
  - Mayor: Steffen Rißmann (CDU)

Area
  - Total: 89.63 km^{2} (34.61 sq mi)
- Elevation: 65 m (213 ft)

Population (2025-12-31)
  - Total: 2,972
  - Density: 33.16/km^{2} (85.88/sq mi)
- Time zone: UTC+01:00 (CET)
  - Summer (DST): UTC+02:00 (CEST)
- Postal codes: 17255
- Dialling codes: 039828, 039832, 039833
- Vehicle registration: MST
- Website: www.wesenberg-mecklenburg.de

Wesenberg (German pronunciation: [ˈveːzn̩ˌbɛʁk]) is a town in the Mecklenburgische Seenplatte district, in Mecklenburg-Western Pomerania, Germany. It is situated 11 km southwest of Neustrelitz, at the south-west end of the Woblitzsee. Wesenberg Castle is located just outside the town.

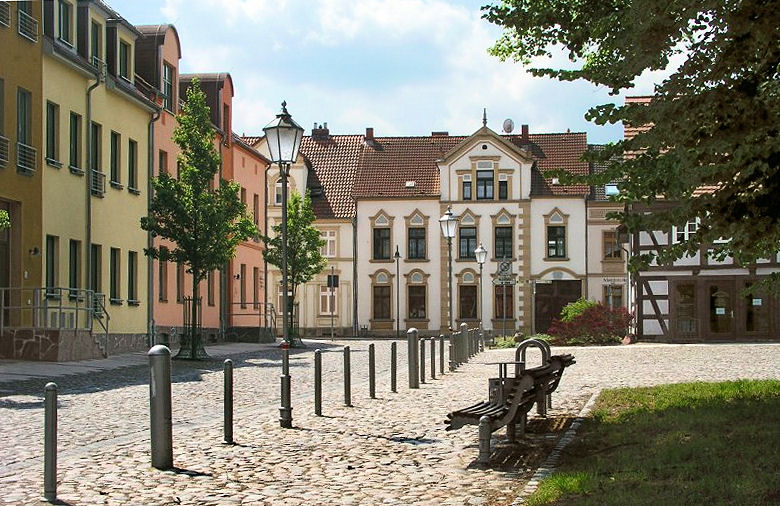
Wesenberg market square

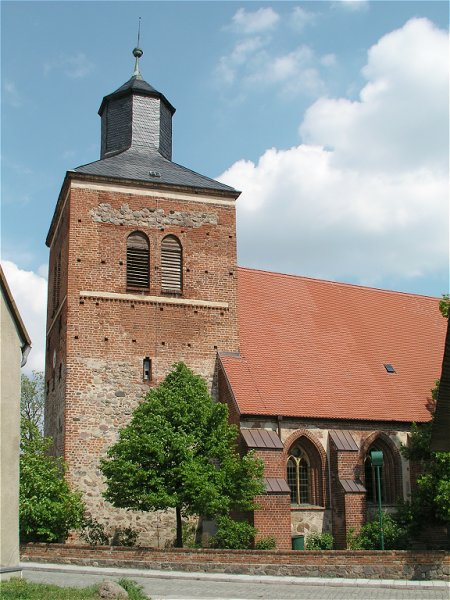
Church of Wesenberg

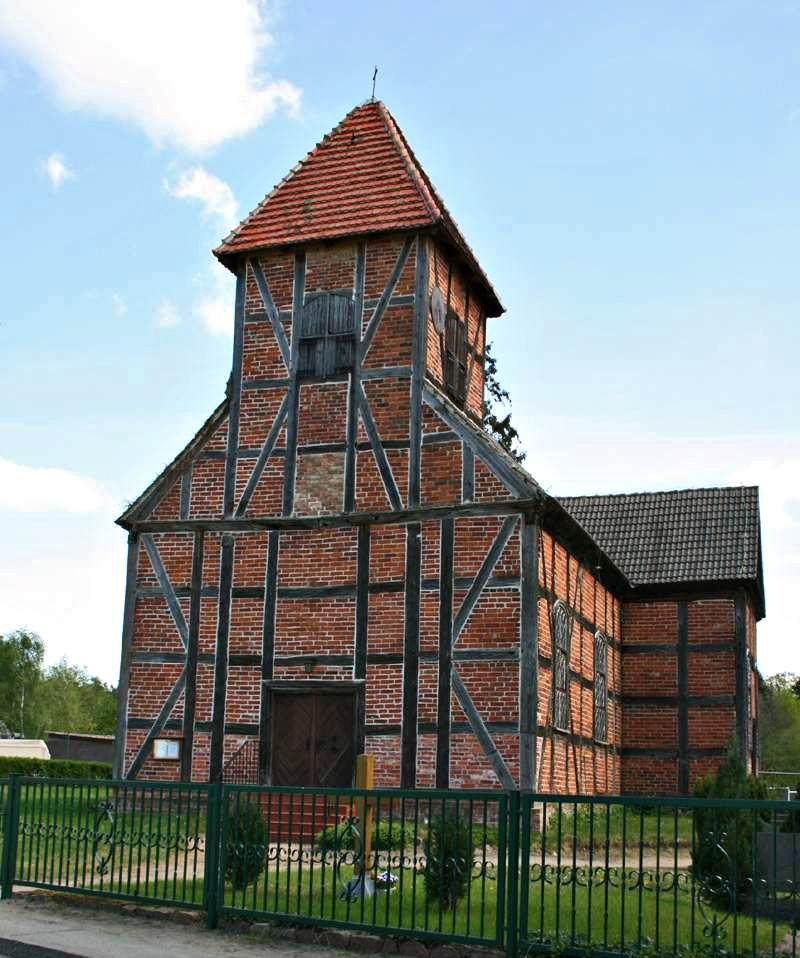
Ahrensberg Church

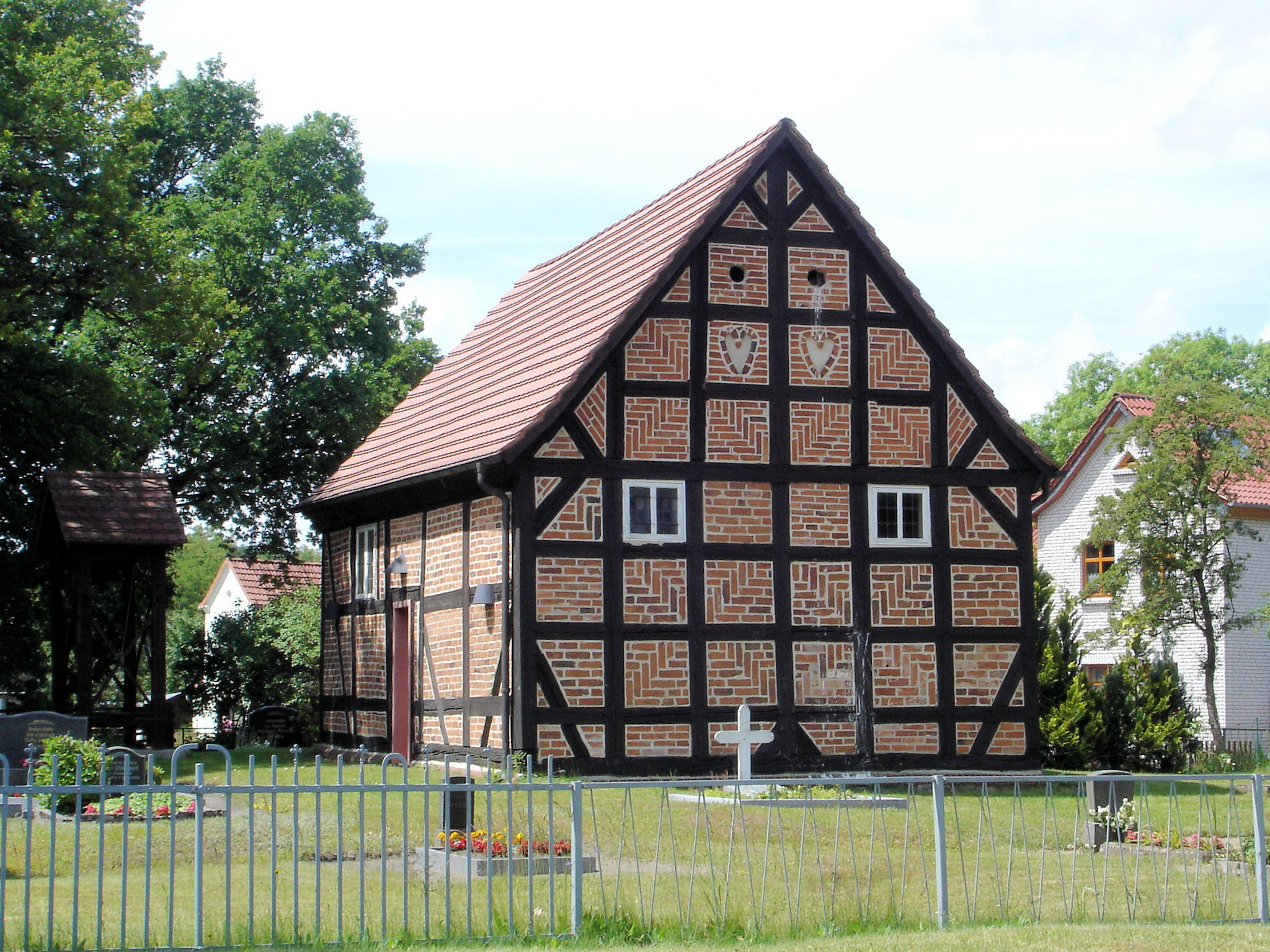
Zirtow Church

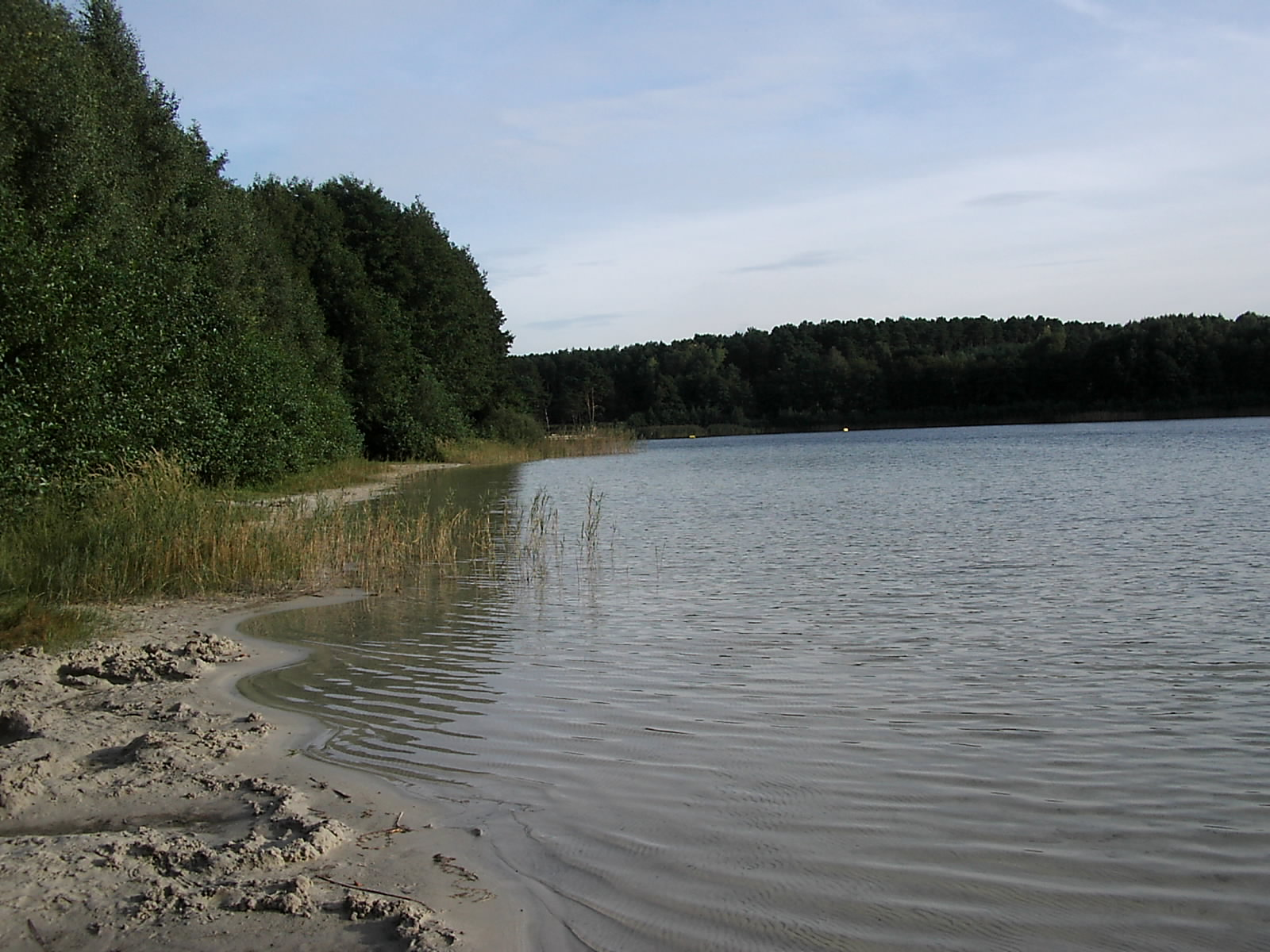
Great White Lake (Grosser Weisser See)

== Notable people ==
- Heinrich Plütschau (1676–1752), one of the first Evangelical priests to India
