= Zierker See =

Lake in Mecklenburg-Vorpommern, Germany

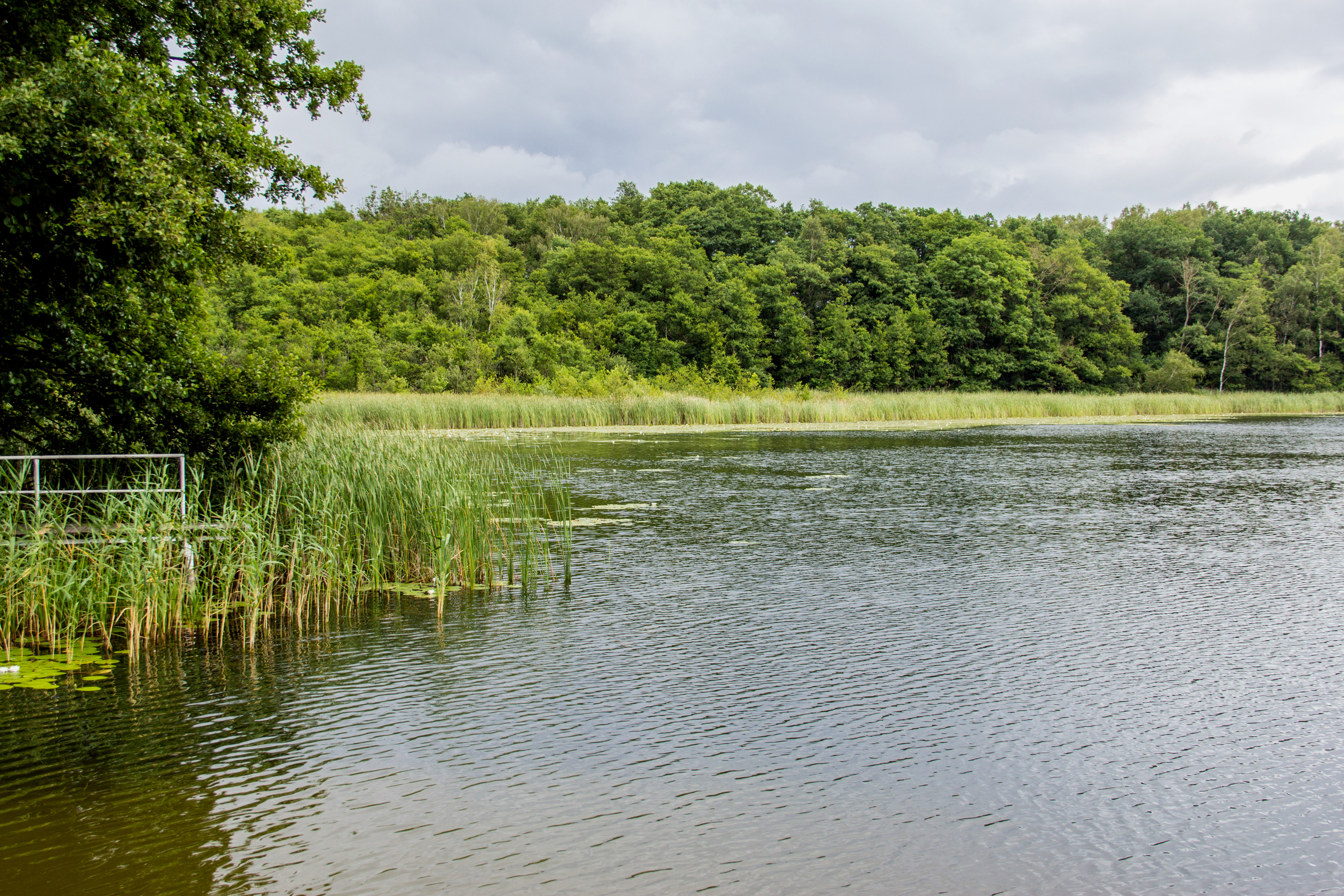
- Forest on Lake Zierker, Neustrelitzer Kleinseenplatte landscape conservation area

- Location within Germany
- Location: Mecklenburgische Seenplatte, Mecklenburg-Vorpommern
- Coordinates: 53°21′41.45″N 13°2′9.47″E
- Primary inflows: none
- Primary outflows: Kammer Canal
- Basin countries: Germany
- Surface area: 3.47 square kilometres (1.34 sq mi)
- Average depth: 1.6 metres (5 ft 3 in)
- Max. depth: 3.5 metres (11 ft)
- Surface elevation: 59 metres (194 ft)

Zierker See (German pronunciation: [ˈtsiːɐ̯kɐ ˈzeː]) is a lake in the Mecklenburg Lake District, in Germany. It is situated in the district of Mecklenburgische Seenplatte of the state of Mecklenburg-Vorpommern. The town of Neustrelitz lies at the northern end of the lake.

The lake is at an elevation of 59 metres (194 ft) and has a surface area is 3.47 square kilometres (1.34 sq mi).

The lake is navigable from Neustrelitz to its southern end, where it meets the Kammer Canal, and navigation is administered as part of the Obere–Havel–Wasserstraße. The Kammer Canal links the Zierker See to the Woblitzsee, allowing vessels to reach the River Havel, which flows through the Woblitzsee.
