= Eider (river) =

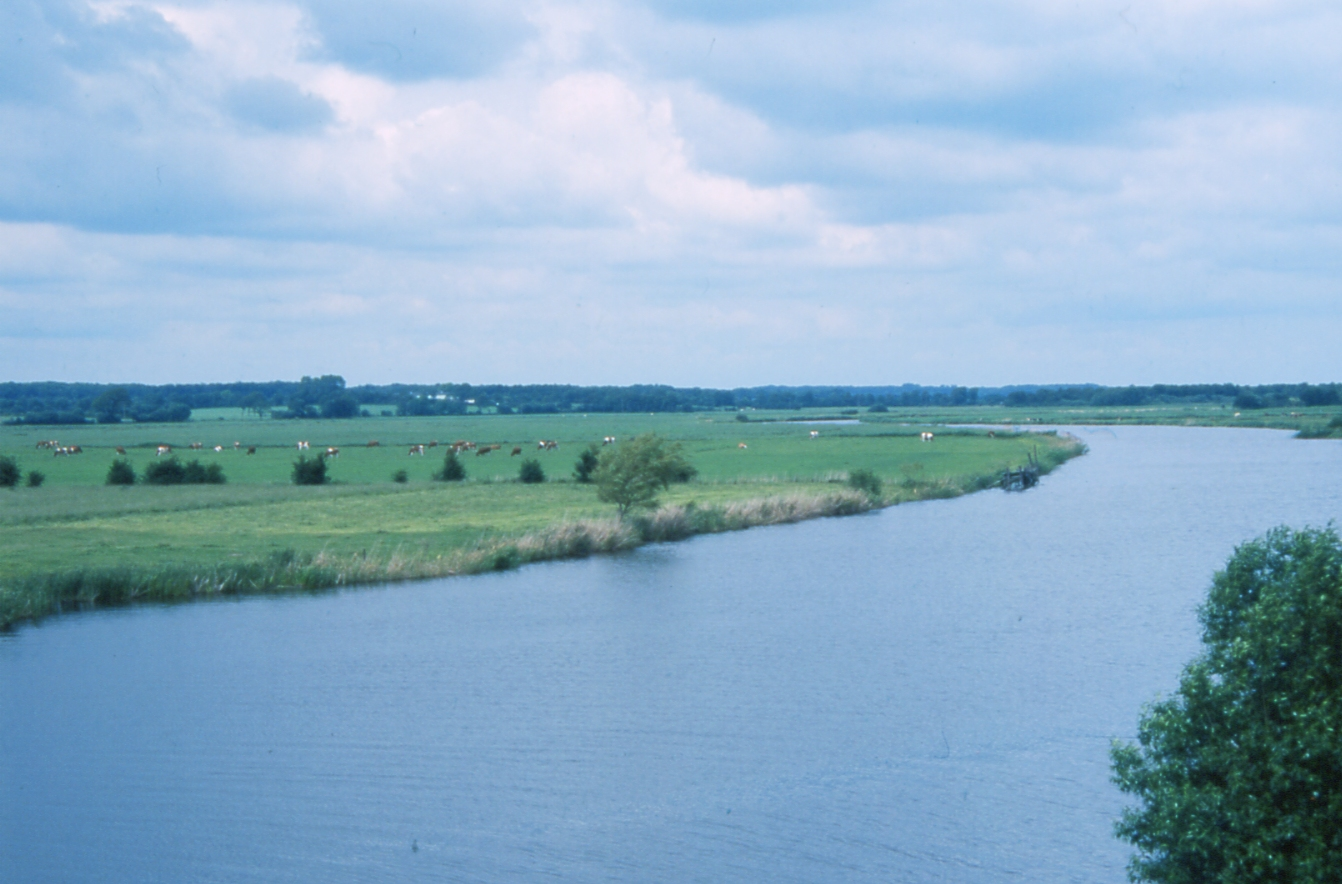
- The Eider at Breiholz

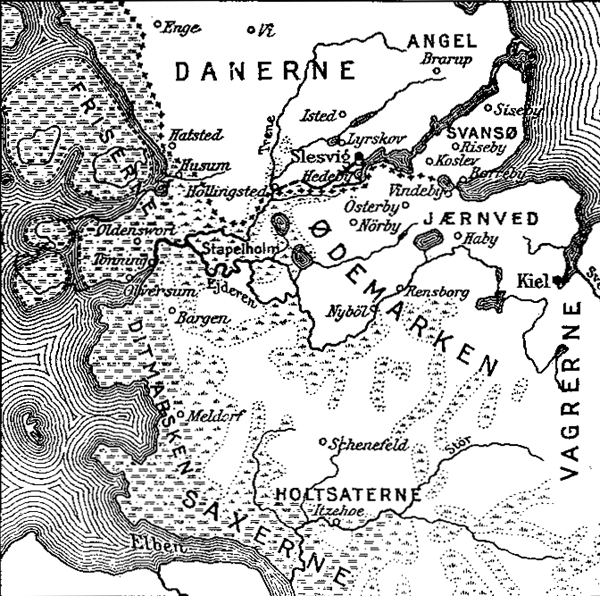
- The Eider (Ejderen) as the borderline between the Danes (Danerne), Saxons (Saxerne), and Frisians (Friserne)

Location
- Country: Germany
- State: Schleswig-Holstein
- Cities: Bordesholm; Kiel; Rendsburg; Friedrichstadt; Tönning

Physical characteristics
- Source: Klaster Teich
  - location: Wattenbek
  - coordinates: 54°8′18″N 10°7′38″E
- Mouth: North Sea
  - location: Tönning
  - coordinates: 54°18′52.27″N 8°57′16.34″E
- Length: 188 km (117 mi)
- Discharge
  - average: 6.5 m^{3}/s (230 cu ft/s)

Basin features
- Tributaries
  - left: Tielenau, Broklandsau, Süderau
  - right: Treene, Sorge

The Eider (German: Eider [ˈaɪdɐ]; Danish: Ejderen; Old Norse: Egða; Latin: Egdor or Eidora) is the longest river on the Jutland Peninsula, and flows through the German state of Schleswig-Holstein along its entire length. The river crosses the peninsula almost across its entire width from east to west. It starts between Bordesholm and Preetz. Shortly after its source, the river reaches the city of Kiel on the Baltic Sea, whose southwestern city limits it partially forms. At the point where the Eider is only a few kilometers from the Baltic Sea –at Lake Schulensee– a terminal moraine –the Hornheimer Riegel– blocks its path, and the Eider from then on turns towards the much more distant North Sea, into which it flows at Tönning.

The wide estuary of the Eider is called Purrenstrom, which is crossed by a closeable storm surge barrier, the Eider Barrage. It has tidal flats and brackish water. The lower part of the Eider was used as part of the Eider Canal until that canal was replaced by the modern Kiel Canal.

The Eider has been an important border river in the past. In the Early Middle Ages the river lay within the settlement area of the West Germanic tribe of the Angles, who together with the Saxons and Frisians crossed the North Sea from there to settle in England. From around 800 to 1200, the Eider was the border between the Saxons and Polabian Slavs to the south, and the Danish Forest to the north. North of this border forest settled the Danes and North Frisians, as reported by Adam of Bremen in 1076. From 804 to 1864 –with two brief interruptions– the river constituted the border between the Frankish Empire, and later East Francia and the Holy Roman Empire, to the south, and Denmark to the north. Today it roughly forms the border between Southern Schleswig and Holstein, the northern and southern part, respectively, of the modern German state of Schleswig-Holstein.

In the 19th century, the Eider gave the Danish National Liberals the name "Eider Danes," as they continued to consider the river Denmark's southern border. It flows through the following towns: Bordesholm, Kiel, Rendsburg, Friedrichstadt and Tönning.

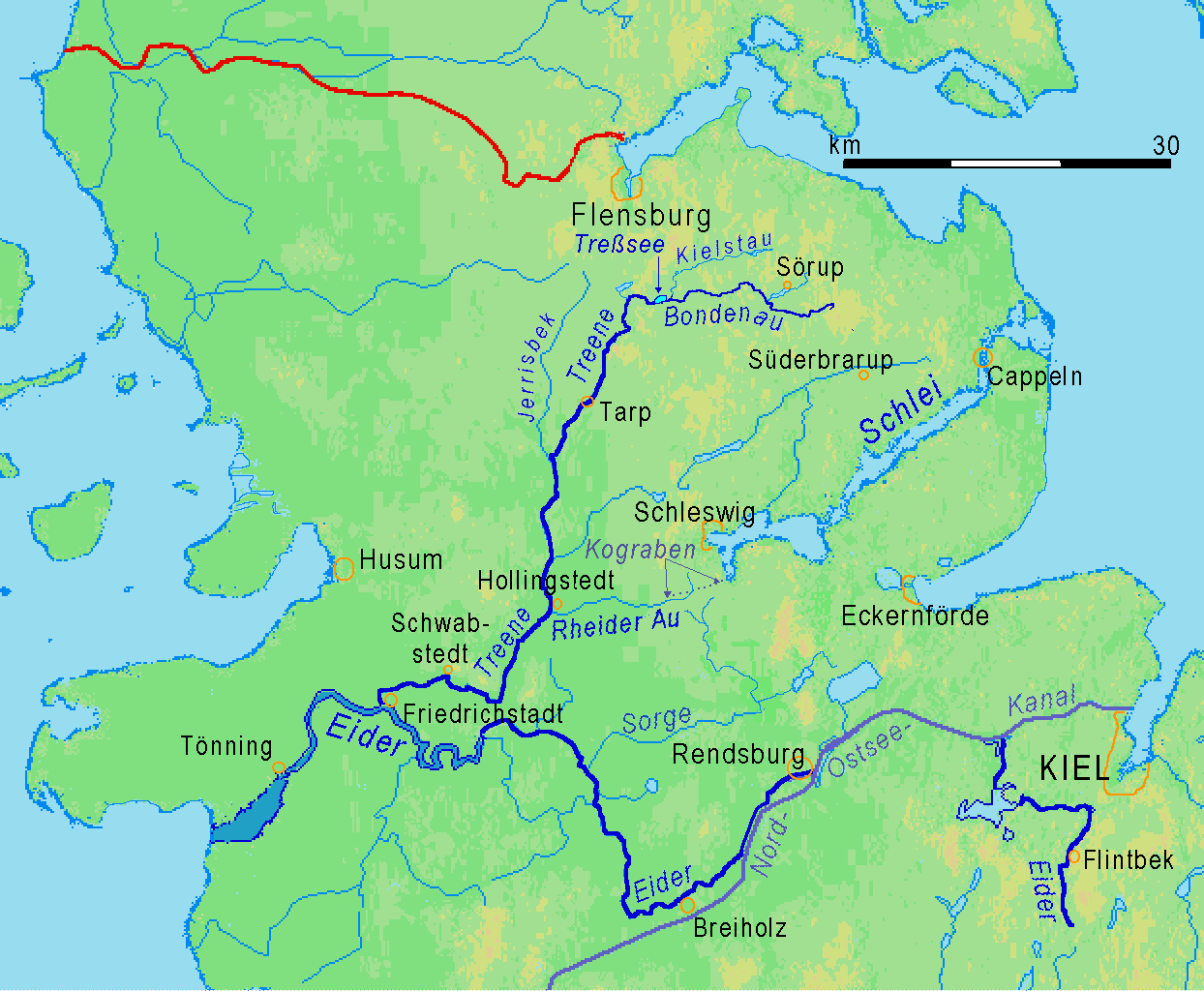
The Eider-Treene basin

== Navigation ==
A tidal lock provides access for boats through the Eider Barrage. The fishing port of Tönning lies 11 kilometres (6.8 mi) upstream of the barrier, while Friedrichstadt is 15 kilometres (9.3 mi) further upstream. At Friedrichstadt a lock gives access to the River Treene.

The Eider remains tidal as far as the lock at Nordfeld, 6 kilometres (3.7 mi) above Friedrichstadt. There is a further lock named Lexfähre near Wrohm, 52 kilometres (32 mi) upstream of Nordfeld. A further 3 kilometres (1.9 mi) beyond Lexfähre is the junction with the short Gieselau Canal, which provides a navigable link to the Kiel Canal at Oldenbüttel. The Eider therefore provides an alternative route from the North Sea to the Kiel Canal, avoiding the tides of the estuary of the Elbe.

The head of navigation lies a further 23 kilometres (14 mi) upstream at Rendsburg. Although it is adjacent to the Kiel Canal, through passage is no longer possible.

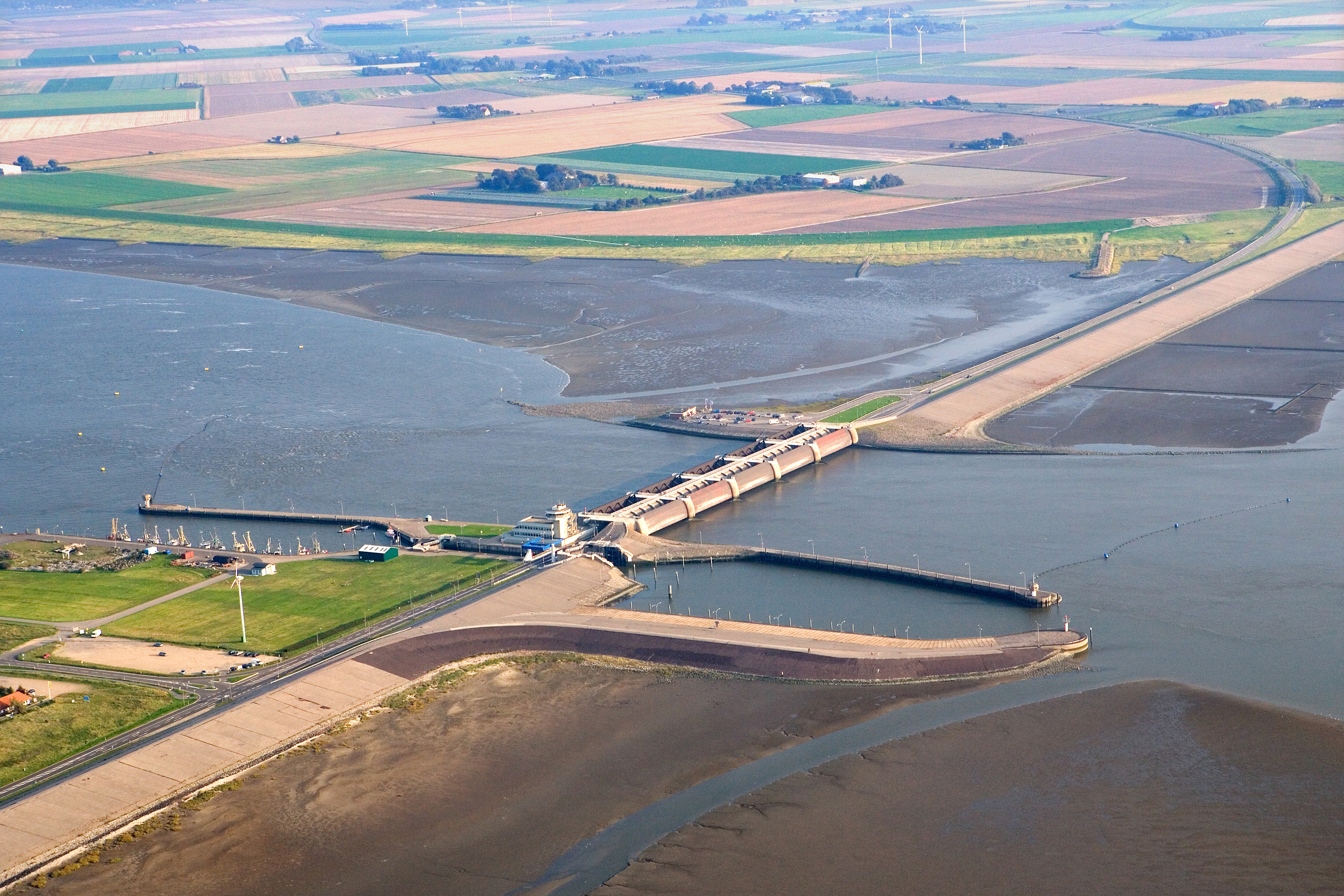
The Eider Barrage

== See also ==
- Eider-Treene Depression
- List of rivers of Schleswig-Holstein
