= Useriner See =

Lake in Userin, Mecklenburg-Vorpommern, Germany

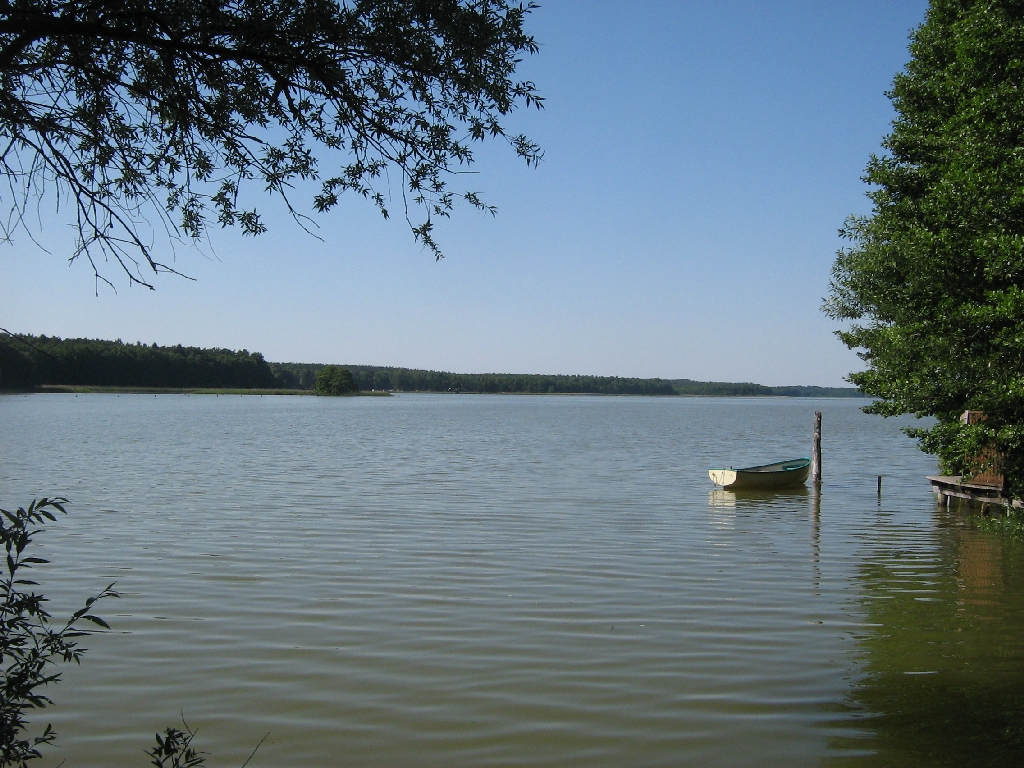

- Location within Mecklenburg-Vorpommern
- Location: Mecklenburgische Seenplatte, Mecklenburg-Vorpommern
- Coordinates: 53°20′28″N 12°58′10″E
- Primary inflows: Havel
- Primary outflows: Havel
- Basin countries: Germany
- Surface area: 3.6 km^{2} (1.4 sq mi)
- Max. depth: ca. 10 m (33 ft)
- Surface elevation: 59.4 m (195 ft)

Useriner See is a lake in the Mecklenburgische Seenplatte district in Mecklenburg-Vorpommern, Germany. At an elevation of 59.4 m, its surface area is 3.6 km².
