= Oldenbüttel =

- Municipality
- Coat of arms

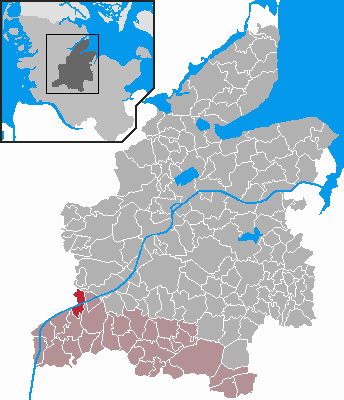
- Location of Oldenbüttel within Rendsburg-Eckernförde district
- Interactive map of Oldenbüttel
- Location within Germany Location within Schleswig-Holstein
- Coordinates: 54°10′N 9°26′E
- Country: Germany
- State: Schleswig-Holstein
- District: Rendsburg-Eckernförde
- Municipal assoc.: Mittelholstein

Government
  - Mayor: Klaus Bock

Area
  - Total: 7.98 km^{2} (3.08 sq mi)
- Elevation: 3 m (9.8 ft)

Population (2025-12-31)
  - Total: 255
  - Density: 32.0/km^{2} (82.8/sq mi)
- Time zone: UTC+01:00 (CET)
  - Summer (DST): UTC+02:00 (CEST)
- Postal codes: 25557
- Dialling codes: 04872, 04332
- Vehicle registration: RD

Oldenbüttel is a municipality in the district of Rendsburg-Eckernförde, in Schleswig-Holstein, Germany.
