= List of lakes of Germany =

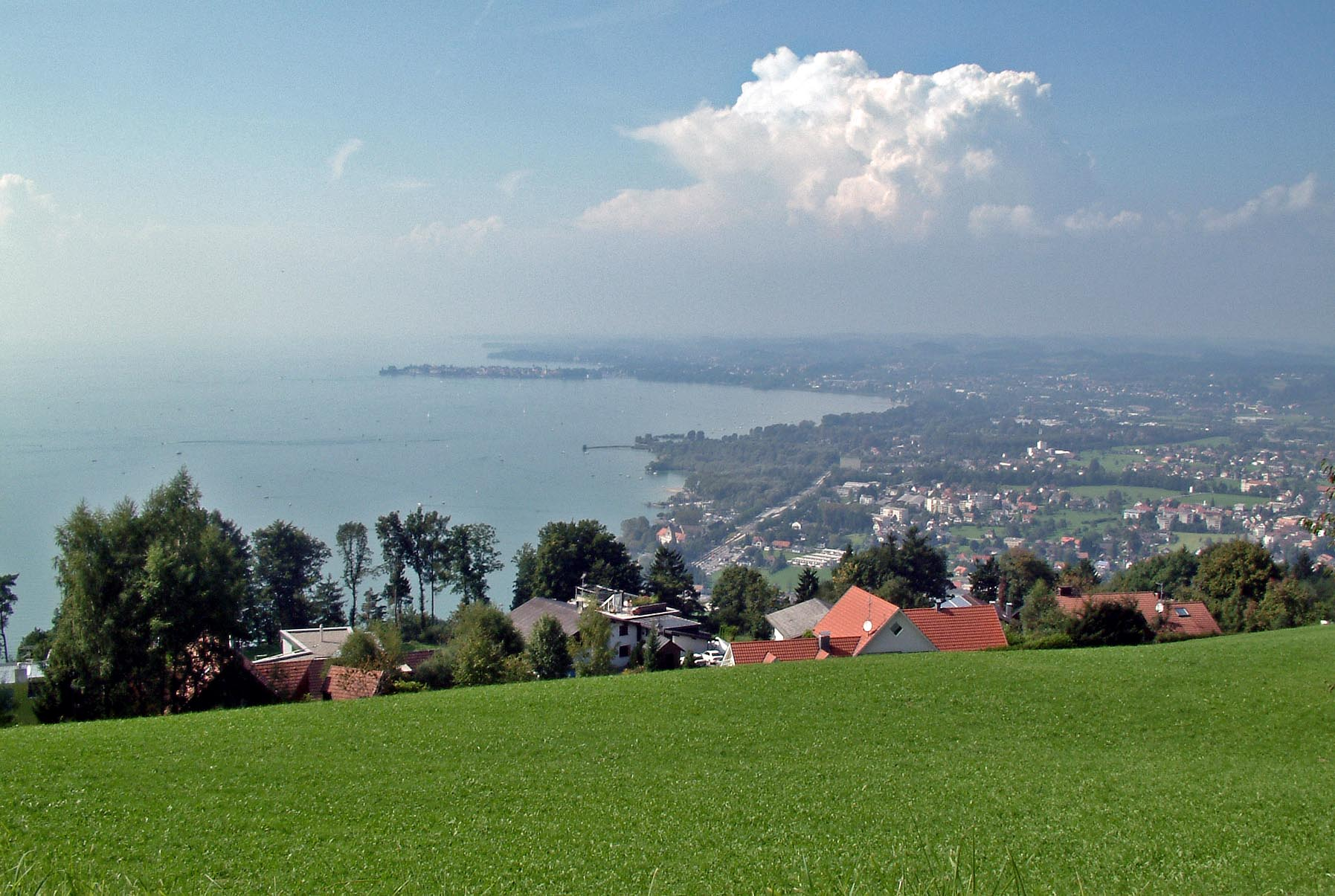
Lake Constance, view towards Lindau (Bavaria)

This is a list of lakes in Germany. The largest lake on German territory is Lake Constance, while Lake Müritz is the largest lake located entirely within German territory.

== List ==
- Aartalsee
- Ammersee
- Binnenalster (Inner Alster Lake)
- Brahmsee
- Breitlingsee
- Brombachsee
- Bucket Lake
- Bullensee
- Chiemsee
- Lake Constance (Bodensee)
- Drielaker See
- Dümmersee
- Edersee
- Eibsee
- Ellbogensee
- Eschbach Reservoir
- Fleesensee
- Gelterswoogsee
- Gothensee
- Gottleuba Reservoir
- Großer Labussee
- Großer Müllroser See
- Großer Priepertsee
- Grunewaldsee
- Halbendorfer See
- Halterner See
- Hengsteysee
- Hohnsensee
- Kellersee
- Königssee (Bavaria)
- Krumme Lanke
- Kuhgrabensee
- Mahndorfer See
- Maschsee
- Mechower See
- Möhne Reservoir (Möhnesee)
- Möserscher See
- Müggelsee
- Müritz
- Norderteich
- Oder Reservoir
- Oker Reservoir
- Orankesee
- Parsteiner See
- Pfaffenteich
- Plauer See (Brandenburg)
- Plauer See (Mecklenburg-Vorpommern)
- Plöner See
- Plötzensee
- Quenzsee
- Röblinsee
- Scharmützelsee
- Schermützelsee
- Schluchsee
- Schweriner See
- Schmollensee
- Schwedtsee
- Seilersee
- Senftenberger See
- Sorpe Reservoir
- Söse Reservoir
- Stolpsee
- Lake Starnberg (Starnberger See)
- Steinhuder Meer
- Lake Tegel (Tegeler See)
- Useriner See
- Viereggenhöfer Teich
- Wangnitzsee
- Wannsee
- Wendsee
- Woblitzsee
- Wolgastsee
- Ziernsee
- Zwischenahner Meer

== See also ==
- List of dams and reservoirs in Germany
- List of lakes in Bavaria
- List of lakes of Hesse
- List of lakes in Mecklenburg-Vorpommern
- List of lakes of Rhineland-Palatinate
- List of lakes in Schleswig-Holstein
