= Berlin–Hohenschönhausen tram =

Tram in Berlin, 1899 to 1919

The Berlin–Hohenschönhausen tram was a tram operated under the Prussian Small Railway Act between Berlin and the rural municipality of Hohenschönhausen, which was incorporated into Berlin in 1920 (from 1911: Berlin-Hohenschönhausen). Opened in 1899, the line was operated by the Continentale Gesellschaft für elektrische Unternehmungen from Nuremberg until 1906, and then by the Aktiengesellschaft der Neue Berliner Straßenbahnen Nordost. In 1910, the Große Berliner Straßenbahn (GBS) bought the company and renamed it the Nordöstliche Berliner Vorortbahn (NöBV). In 1919, the line was absorbed into the GBS and thus became an integral part of the Berlin tram network. Large parts of the route are still in operation and are currently served by the M5 tram line of the Berliner Verkehrsbetriebe (BVG).

== History ==
=== Past history ===
After the construction of the Stettiner Bahn in 1842 and the Ostbahn in 1867, Hohenschönhausen was in a region that was only inadequately connected to the Prussian railway network. With the construction of the central cattle and slaughterhouse along the ring line south of Landsberger Allee in 1881, the community experienced major population growth. Along Berliner Straße (from 1985: Konrad-Wolf-Straße), the colonies of Neu-Hohenschönhausen were created in the area of today's Sportforum and Wilhelmsberg in the area of today's Fennpfuhl district. Another major employer from 1892 was the Hohenschönhausen brewery (from 1903: Löwenbrauerei) on Berliner Straße.

In 1890, Manon Gropius sold the Hohenschönhausen manor to the merchant Gerhard Puchmüller, who had it divided into parcels from 1892 onwards. The following year, the Aachen banker Henry Suermondt acquired the estate from Puchmüller and founded the Berlin Land Acquisition and Construction Company to market the land. The first Hohenschönhausen villa colony was subsequently built on the site between Berliner Strasse and Orankesee. The Neue Boden Aktien-Gesellschaft later acquired the land north of it on the Obersee from the brewery, and a second villa colony was built on it around the turn of the century. In order to connect the village and the colonies to Berlin, the Land Acquisition and Construction Company set up a horse-drawn bus line in 1893 to the intersection of Landsberger Allee and Elbinger Strasse (today: Danziger Strasse). Here there was a connection to the lines of the New Berlin Horse-Drawn Tram (NBPf) in the direction of Alexanderplatz. With the Landsberger Allee ring station, which opened west of the municipal border on May 1, 1895, Hohenschönhausen had another connection point to local public transport.

=== Planning and approval procedures ===
By 1894, the bus was already carrying 137,950 people and was soon reaching its capacity limits. In the same year, Suermondt submitted an application to the Niederbarnim district committee for approval of a Berlin–Hohenschönhausen tram line. The application included a detailed plan of the route, which was to run from Landsberger Allee via Thaerstrasse (from 1911: Oderbruchstrasse), Hohenschönhauser Strasse and Berliner Strasse to Bahnhofstrasse (from 1912: Degnerstrasse). Passing points were planned on Hohenschönhauser Strasse and at the level of Orankestrasse. The plan also envisaged a depot with an attached power station at the eastern end of the route. The line ran on Berliner up to the control house at the intersection of Landsberger Allee and Thaerstrasse, then up to the junction of today's Berkenbrücker Steig in the Lichtenberg municipal area.

On 17 January 1895, the district committee granted approval for the section running through Lichtenberg subject to conditions. These called for the track to be relocated to the south side of the street. The company had to bear the costs of paving or resurfacing the streets, as well as removing the tracks if the line was closed. A deposit of 10,000 marks had to be paid as security. The tree protection measures demanded by the rural municipality of Lichtenberg (with town rights from 1907/08, Berlin-Lichtenberg from 1912) at the company's expense did not have to be complied with. On 30 July 1895, the municipality of Hohenschönhausen passed a resolution to grant the railway approval until 31 December 1925; the corresponding approval letter was written on 20 January 1896. It largely corresponded to its Lichtenberg counterpart, from which some passages were taken. The company agreed to this without reservation on January 29, 1896.

To carry out the construction and operation of the railway, the land acquisition and construction company concluded a contract shortly afterwards with the Continentale Gesellschaft für elektrische Unternehmungen (Continentale) from Nuremberg, which then founded the Berlin-Hohenschönhausen electric tramway in 1897. Continentale then held negotiations with the Berlin magistrate in order to be able to extend the railway as far into the city as possible. Both sides agreed to extend the railway over the NBPf tracks to the corner of Landsberger Strasse and Waßmannstrasse. On June 29 and July 8, 1898, both sides signed the corresponding consent contract. In it, Continentale undertook to pay eight percent of the gross revenue generated annually to the city of Berlin for the use of the toll route. If the profits exceeded six percent of the invested capital, the city would receive half of these surpluses.

Accordingly, the magistrate was granted the right to obtain information about the entrepreneur's financial situation. Meanwhile, the Hohenschönhausen municipal council was trying to extend the route to the schoolhouse on Dorfstrasse (from around 1900: Hauptstrasse). The company, represented by legal counsel Julius Grosse-Leege, was willing to agree to this provided the municipality made a corresponding contribution towards the costs. The municipality initially declared itself willing to cover the costs of paving Berliner Strasse, amounting to 50,000 marks, as well as an interest guarantee of five percent for six years. When Grosse-Leege pointed out that if an interest guarantee had been granted, the district committee would have had to negotiate again, thus delaying the process, the municipality increased the guarantee to 2,500 marks per year for a period of ten years. The district administrator then informed the municipality that he would not approve this project because the sum exceeded the municipality's ability to pay. He therefore demanded that the landowners adjacent to the route participate in the guarantee. The company finally promised more favorable conditions: instead of 50,000 marks, the municipality would now have to raise 30,000 marks for the paving and pay interest on the capital at a rate of five percent (1,500 marks) over ten years. On June 28, 1898, the municipal council decided to accept the company's conditions. When enough people had signed up, the district committee approved the project.

=== Construction and commissioning ===
When the contract was signed in 1898, Continentale had committed itself to applying for official approval within six months. After the concession was granted, construction was to begin immediately and be completed after a year, otherwise it would expire. Despite the concession still being outstanding, the company made initial construction preparations in the same year and immediately began laying the line. According to Suermondt's plans, the operations center was to be built on Bahnhofstrasse. This was where the construction of a carriage shed, a power plant to supply electricity, and administration were planned. The work progressed relatively quickly, so that the railway could be officially approved on the morning of October 21, 1899. The opening took place afterwards. The carriages, eight motor cars and six trailers, were "adorned with fir leaves" and bore the Bavarian flag as a reference to the Nuremberg company. Around nine months later, on June 16, 1900, the Royal Police Headquarters in Berlin granted the outstanding concession.

The trains covered the route, which was given as a 6,616 meter long, in 30 minutes at a top speed of 30 km/h. Trains ran every 20 or 24 minutes. A more frequent service was initially ruled out because the electrical control center had not yet been completed and the railway therefore had to get its power from the Berlin power plants. In addition to passenger traffic, the company also had to transport waste, sewer contents and corpses in specially designed wagons at the request of the magistrate and in return for compensation. The frequency and extent of the latter transports are not known, but there are several indications in the company's annual reports that they were carried out. The necessity is explained by the fact that the railway provided a direct connection between the municipal hospital in Friedrichshain and the Protestant cemetery of the St. Andreas and St. Markus parishes and the Catholic cemetery of the St. Pius and St. Hedwig parishes.

=== Extension and takeover by the Great Berlin Tramway ===
Transport performance was moderate in the first few years. In 1902 the railway carried 1.3 million passengers with a workforce of 55. No dividend was paid. As early as 1900, Continentale tried to extend the route via Kaiserstrasse, Alexanderstrasse, Grunerstrasse, Neue Friedrichstrasse and Wallstrasse to Spittelmarkt. The police headquarters rejected the application, citing the narrow width of Neue Friedrichstrasse. In the outward direction, the company was granted a preliminary concession in 1906 to extend the line to Ahrensfelde with an option to the new Ostkirchhof. This plan was not implemented. A further application in July 1919 was rejected due to lack of demand.

On December 10, 1906, the newly founded Neue Berliner Straßenbahnen Nordost AG took over the railway from the Continentale Company. In 1907, the company introduced a 7.5-minute cycle, and on August 4, 1908, the line was extended by around 700 metres to the immediate vicinity of Alexanderplatz. The track ran from the Waßmannstrasse terminus through Elisabethstrasse to Kurze Strasse. This also increased passenger numbers, so that the company was able to pay a dividend of four percent, or 48,000 marks, that year. In order to forestall further competition, the GBS, which had already taken over the NBPf in 1900, acquired the company's shares on May 3, 1910. From then on, the company was known as the Nordöstliche Berliner Vorortbahn AG (NöBV). At the same time, the GBS took over the administration of the railway.

In 1911, the railway carried around four million passengers. Demand was particularly high each year at Whitsun and Remembrance Sunday. On 5 May 1913, the extension from the schoolhouse to the intersection of Wartenberger Strasse and Falkenberger Strasse (since 1984: Gehrenseestrasse) went into operation. The NöBV line was withdrawn to Orankestrasse on the same day and given the line designation NO. The new section of route was taken over by GBS line 164, which had been running on the NöBV tracks to Landsberger Allee station since 15 April 1912. Its western terminus was initially at Jungfernheide station and from 1914 in Siemensstadt.

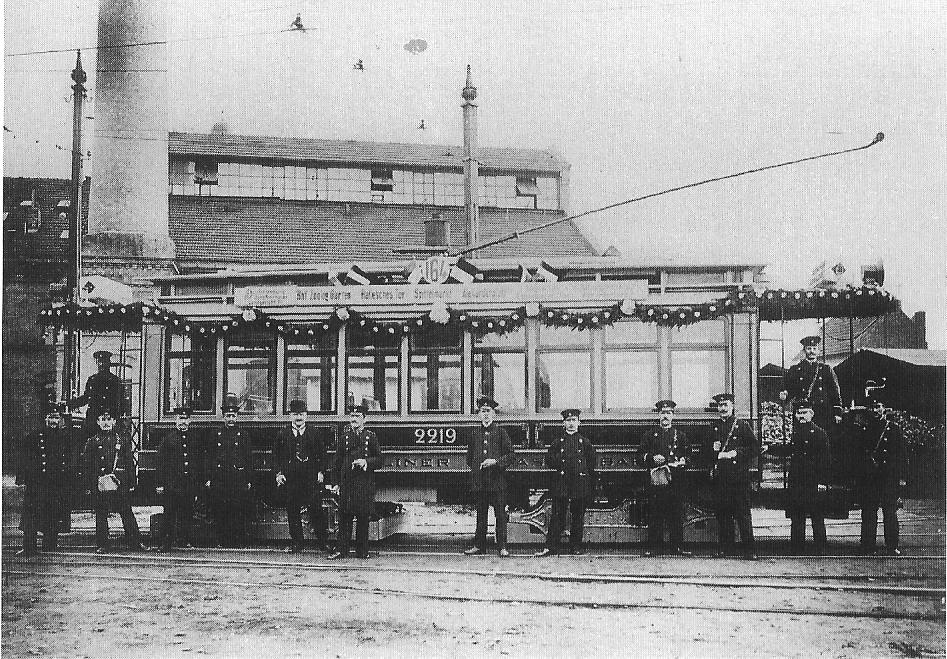
Maximum-Triebwagen 2219 der Großen Berliner Straßenbahn auf der Linie 164 im Betriebshof Degnerstraße, 1912

After the outbreak of the First World War, the NöBV temporarily ceased operations on the NO line on 3 August 1914. It went back into operation in the course of 1915. On May 28, 1918, a new consent agreement was concluded between the GBS and its branch lines (Berlin-Charlottenburg Tramway, Northeastern Berlin Suburban Railway, Southern Berlin Suburban Railway and Western Berlin Suburban Railway) on the one hand, and the Greater Berlin Association on the other. Among other things, this agreement allowed the GBS to use the roads until 1949. The agreement also provided for a merger of the GBS with its branch lines. Initially, from January 1, 1919, all trams in the association's area ran on the association's account. On March 3, 1919, the association assembly then gave its consent to the merger of the individual railways with the GBS, which was finally completed on May 15, 1919. The accounting was standardized back to January 1, 1918. The Nordöstliche Berliner Vorortbahn AG thus ceased to exist. The association bought the GBS two months later. This became the property of the city of Berlin after the Greater Berlin Act came into force on October 1, 1920. The communities of Berlin-Hohenschönhausen and Berlin-Lichtenberg were incorporated into Berlin on the same day. On December 13, 1920, the Greater Berlin Tramway, the Trams of the City of Berlin and the Berlin Electric Trams merged to form the Berlin Tramway.

=== Development after 1920 ===
Lines NO and 164 remained in existence after the formation of the Berlin tram system and served the section between Waßmannstrasse and Orankestrasse together. Line NO was probably discontinued on December 15, 1921, while line 164 remained in existence until it was completely discontinued on September 9, 1923, after which it disappeared completely from the Berlin route plan. From September 10, 1923, line 64 took over service as far as Degnerstrasse. The sections as far as Wartenberger Strasse and Elisabethstrasse remained without traffic for the time being. From March 18, 1924, line 66 ran as far as Wartenberger Strasse, and line 64 was withdrawn as far as Dönhoffplatz at the same time. After line 66 was discontinued on December 1, 1931, line 64 ran exclusively to Hohenschönhausen again.

The western end of the route on Elisabethstrasse was no longer served as scheduled after 1921, but remained as an operational route for a few more years. Only a short section between Kleine and Große Frankfurter Strasse - the latter was extended to Landsberger Strasse in the early 1930s - served as the terminus for lines heading for Alexanderplatz from the 1930s onwards. BVG-Ost closed this section on August 3, 1962.

The 64 existed beyond the Second World War until tram service on Leipziger Strasse was discontinued on August 24, 1970. From 1952, it supplemented line 63, which, after being renamed twice, has been running as the M5 between Hackescher Markt S-Bahn station and Hohenschönhausen, Zingster Strasse since December 12, 2004. It runs almost the entire length of the section of the route that opened in 1899.

== Route description ==
Since 1908, the western terminus was in Kurze Straße, which ran not far from Alexanderplatz from Landsberger Straße in a southerly direction to Kaiserstraße. The teacher's house is now located at the level of the former coupling terminus. The route ran from Kurze Straße via Elisabethstraße and Waßmannstraße to Büschingplatz, where it joined the tracks of the existing routes. The terminus in 1899 was in Waßmannstraße. The entire area up to Büschingplatz was redesigned and built over when Alexanderplatz was rebuilt in the 1960s. The streets mentioned were deconsecrated during this period.

The line then followed the tracks of the NBPf and GBS along Landsberger Straße and Landsberger Allee to the intersection of Petersburger Straße/Elbinger Straße (today: Danziger Straße). While the GBS line turned into Petersburger Straße, the municipal tram line from Elbinger Straße met the tracks of the Hohenschönhausen tram. Both lines shared the section up to Ebertystrasse. Behind Ebertystrasse, the road rose to cross the ring railway tracks at Landsberger Allee station. For the use of the bridge, the Continentale Company had to pay an annual fee of 250 marks to the Prussian railway treasury. The corresponding contract was concluded for an indefinite period.

At the intersection of Landsberger Allee and Oderbruchstrasse, Thaerstrasse and Roederstrasse (today: Karl-Lade-Strasse), the line turned into Oderbruchstrasse. Since November 2, 1912, a tram has run along Roederstrasse in the direction of Herzberge. At this point, Oderbruchstrasse was also the border between Berlin and Lichtenberg. The line ran from Oderbruchstrasse along Hohenschönhauser Strasse and reached the Hohenschönhauser district at the height of today's Berkenbrücker Steig. The street name changed here to Berliner Strasse (since 1985: Konrad-Wolf-Strasse). Since 1938 the border in this area has been further west on Weißenseer Weg. At Bahnhofstrasse a track branched off to the headquarters, which in 1962 was expanded to form a block bypass via Oberseestrasse. In 1912 the municipality of Hohenschönhausen renamed Bahnhofstrasse Degnerstrasse after the first director of the railway, Friedrich Degner. The railway followed Berliner Strasse and then Hauptstrasse into the Hohenschönhausen village centre. The first terminus was before the Wartenberger Strasse junction. The extension, opened in 1913, continued along Wartenberger Strasse to Falkenberger Strasse, where there was a coupling terminus. In 1963 a turning loop was built in the triangle between Wartenberger and Falkenberger Strasse, which was rebuilt in 1984.

The tracks were laid to standard gauge (1435 millimetres). The drive system was electric operation via overhead lines with roller pantographs. The voltage was 550 volts direct current, as with the Great Berlin Tram. In the event that another drive system proved to be more suitable for Berlin conditions, the company was granted the right to introduce it. The company was responsible for any stray traffic that might occur; however, as there were no scientific facilities along the route, this paragraph was superfluous. On 16 August 1954, the BVG-Ost converted line 64, which ran on the route, to sled operation.

== Tariff ==
Fare information for the Hohenschönhausen tram is extremely sparse. According to one source, the fare was a flat rate of ten pfennigs; according to other sources, there was a tiered fare of ten, 15 and 20 pfennigs. There is reason to believe that these fares applied at different times or separately on lines NO and 164.

The Great Berlin Tramway and its branch lines introduced a ten-pfennig flat rate on 1 January 1901, which also applied to the NöBV line after 1910. An exception was line 164, which was transferred to the NöBV and Berlin-Charlottenburg Tramway (BCS) network. The GBS charged an increased fare of 20 pfennigs for the entire route and ten or 15 pfennigs for individual sections on these lines. This connecting tariff was abolished in the consent agreement of May 28, 1918 and replaced by a 12.5-pfennig standard tariff for all GBS lines and its branch lines. From then on, the Berlin tram tariff was the only tariff that applied on the route to Hohenschönhausen.

No information is available about discounts, season tickets and collective tickets.

== Operation ==
=== Vehicles ===
When operations opened in 1899, eight railcars (numbers 1–8) and six trailers (numbers 9–14) were available. In 1900 and 1901, nine railcars (numbers 19–23 and 24–27) were added, which were similar in size and construction to the GBS Berolina cars, and four trailers followed in 1902. These vehicles were identical in size to the trailers from 1899. Since they were also numerically sorted into the existing gap (numbers 15–18), it is assumed that the vehicles were ordered together with the older cars. As a result of the line extension to Kurze Straße, the railway acquired five more trailers in 1908, including a deck seat car.

When the GBS took over management, the railcars from 1899 were converted to trailers and vice versa, the trailers from 1908 were converted to railcars. The deck seat car was converted to a single-decker. The exact reasons for the conversion of the vehicles are not known. The 1908 cars had more seats, and the trailers 28 and 29 were also equipped with Berolina chassis, which may have made maintenance of the railcars easier. The new railcars took over the drive of the old vehicles. The conversion was accompanied by a renumbering of the vehicle fleet. Railcars were given numbers below 30, trailers above them. All vehicles were transferred to the BSt fleet in 1920. The BSt decommissioned the vehicles by 1930, and some were transferred to the work car fleet.

Vehicle overview
Construction year	Manufacturer (mech./electr.)	Car number until 1910	Car number from 1910	Car number from 1920	Whereabouts
1899	Busch / Schuckert	1–8	41–48	684–691	Railcar; converted to trailer in 1910; 1925 Bw 684, 685, 690, 691 decommissioned; the rest in Bw 2096–2099, decommissioned in 1927
1899	MAN	9–14	31–36	674–679	Trailer; 1925 in Bw 2086–2091; 1927 in Bw 1697II–1702II and decommissioned
1900	BSI / AEG	19–23	1–5	3050–3054	Railcars; 1924 Tw 3050 to A60, decommissioned by 1933; 1924 Tw 3052 to A122, decommissioned by 1929; others decommissioned by 1930
1901	? / AEG	24–27	6–9	3873–3876	Railcar; 1925 Tw 3873 to Bw 1855; the rest decommissioned in 1929
1902		15–18	37–40	680–683	Trailer; 1925 in Bw 2092–2095; 1927 in Bw 1703II–1706II and decommissioned
1908		28+29	10+11	3877+3878	Trailer; converted to railcar in 1910; 1924 Tw 3877 to A49; 1929 Tw 3878 retired
1908	MAN / AEG	30	12	4081	Deck seat trailer; converted to single-deck railcar in 1910; decommissioned in 1929
1908	MAN / AEG	31	13	4082	Trailer; converted to railcar in 1910; decommissioned in 1929
1908	MAN / AEG	32	14	4083	Railcar; decommissioned in 1929

=== Depot ===
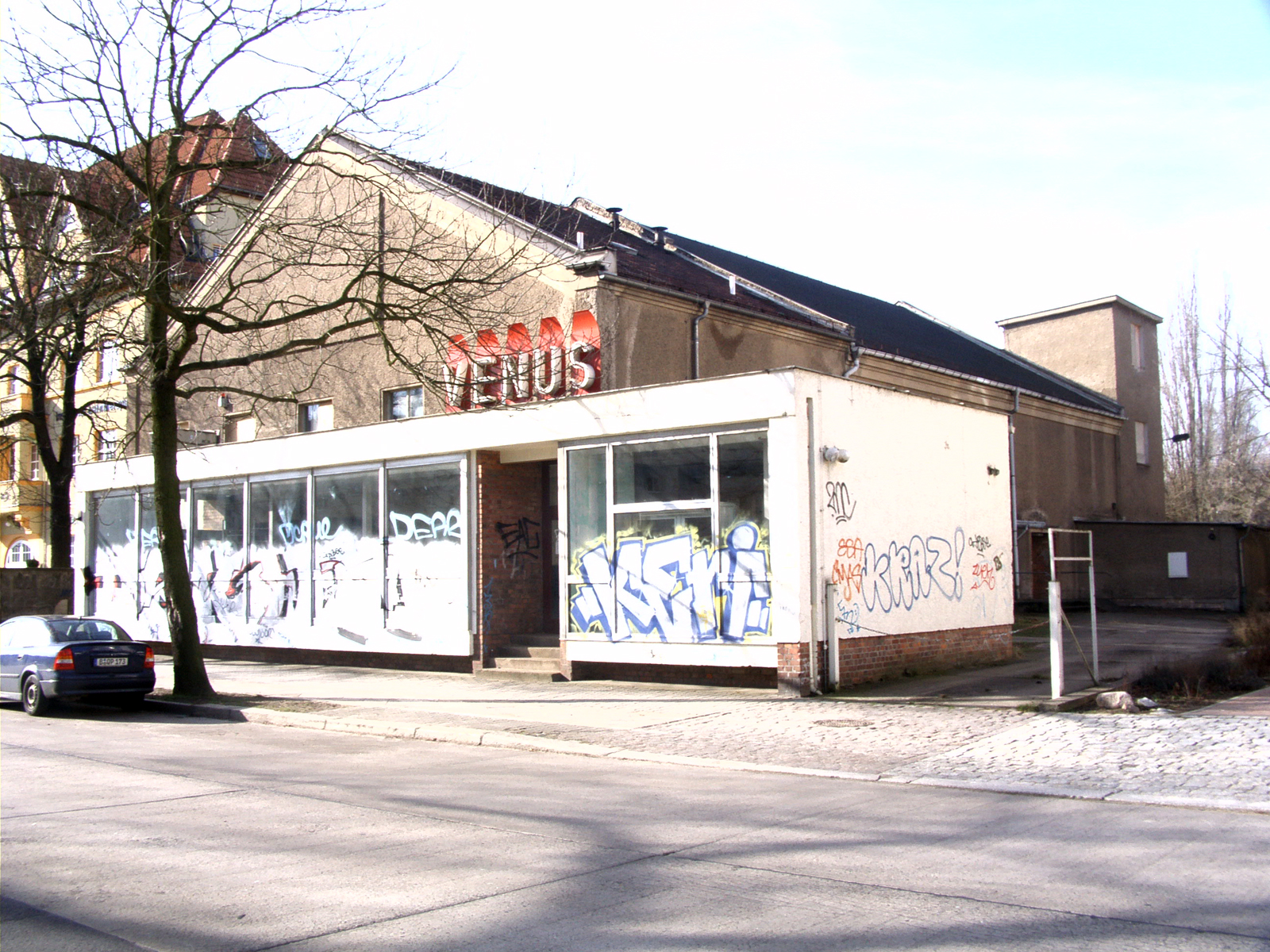
Ehemaliger Verwaltungsbau in der Degnerstraße, 2007

The depot was located at Bahnhofstrasse 7–10 (from 1912: Degnerstrasse) in Hohenschönhausen. In the rear part of the property there was a detached carriage hall with six hall tracks and the connected operating rooms with a workshop, paint shop, carpentry shop, forge and urinal. The tracks to the left of the entrance had inspection pits in the front area. Another track led to the workshop to the left of it and the paint shop behind it. In the front part of the property was the railway administration building. There was also an electricity plant on the site to supply electricity.

In 1918 the yard offered storage space for 41 carriages on an area of 12,608 square metres. After the NöBV was taken over by the GBS, the latter briefly ran the yard under the number XXIII. After the merger with the BSt at the end of 1920, it was closed as a depot.

In 1929, the businessman Carl Bresin leased the hall and set up a food factory in it. The hall was destroyed in the Second World War and the administration building suffered severe damage. In 1948, the couple Anna and Georg Reichardt bought the damaged administration building and set up a cinema in it. The name of the cinema, which opened in 1956 - Uhu - came from a bird that nested in the ruins during the construction work. In 1959, the Berlin magistrate took over the cinema and renamed it Venus in 1967. In the 1970s and 1980s, the building also served as a second venue for the cabaret Die Distel, with performances taking place three times a week, alternating with those in the Admiralspalast.

After the opening of a multiplex cinema at the Hohenschönhausen S-Bahn station, the cinema in the former depot had to close in 2000. A temporary reopening in 2004 was followed by the establishment of a photo studio at the end of 2012. On 23 October 1999, a commemorative plaque was attached to the building to mark the railway's 100th anniversary. Remnants of tracks were still on the site until the 1990s.

== Literature ==
- "Die Straßenbahn Berlin–Hohenschönhausen", Berliner Verkehrsblätter, vol. Hefte 12, 1956, Heft 1, 1957
- Wanja Abramowski (1989), 90 Jahre Straßenbahn Berlin-Hohenschönhausen
- Michael Günther (1999), "Mit Zinsgarantie zum Gutsschloß. Wie die Straßenbahn nach "Hohen=Schönhausen" kam", Verkehrsgeschichtliche Blätter, vol. Heft 5
