= Wietzesee =

Lake in Langenhagen, Germany

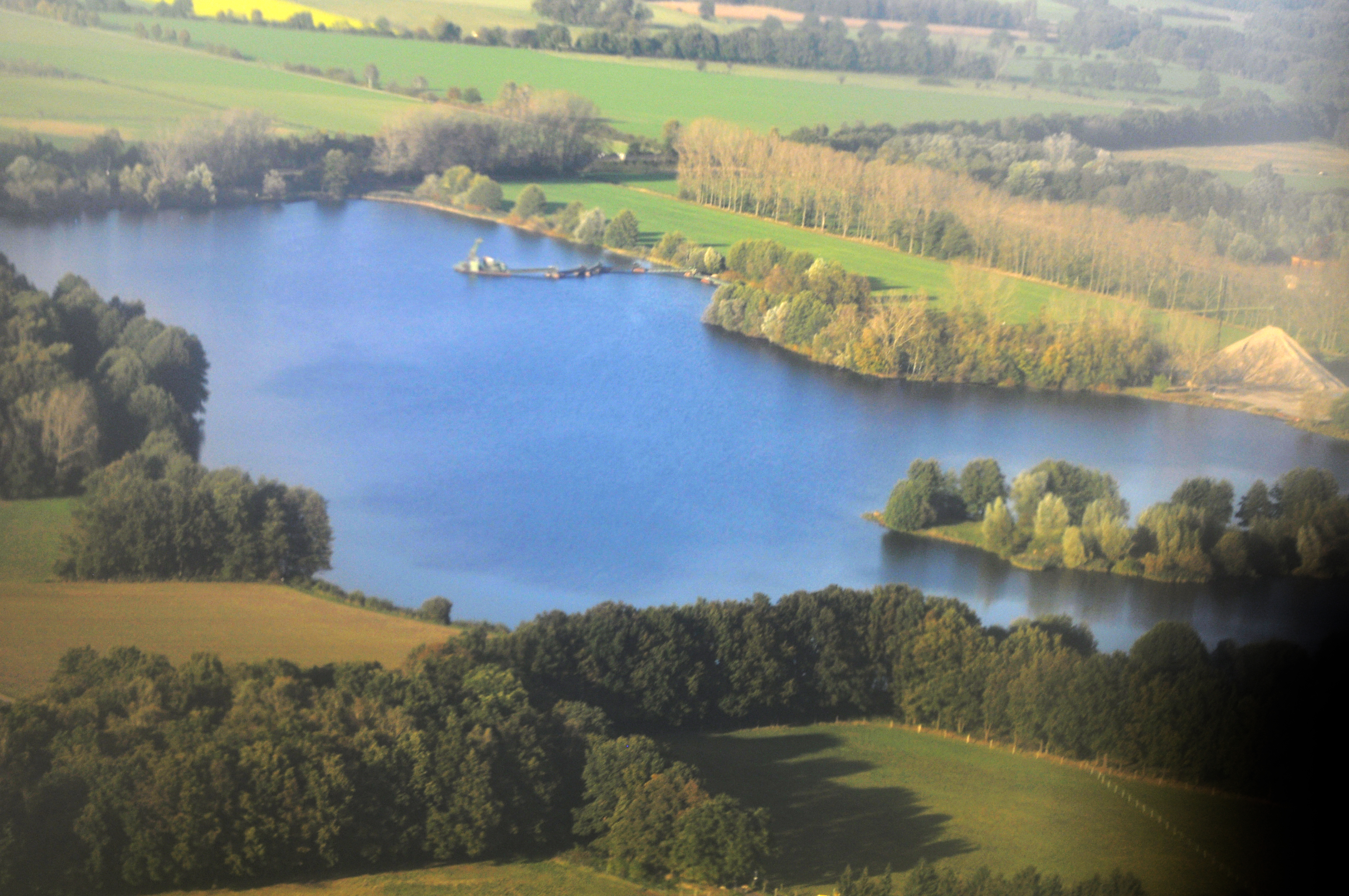
- Aerial view of Wietzesee from the south, October 2014

- Location within Germany
- Location: Langenhagen, Region Hannover, Niedersachsen
- Coordinates: 52°27′58″N 9°45′59″E

The Wietzesee (also known as Hastrasee) is a 29-hectare artificial lake near Langenhagen in the Hanover Region.

== Description ==
It is located between the district of Krähenwinkel and Isernhagen in the Wietzetal landscape conservation area.

The lake is used for fishing by the Hannover Fishing Association and is described as having a good stock of pike and carp. Swimming in Wietzesee is officially prohibited, although in the summer, such a large number of swimmers are observed that the lake is considered difficult to fish in.

== Gallery ==
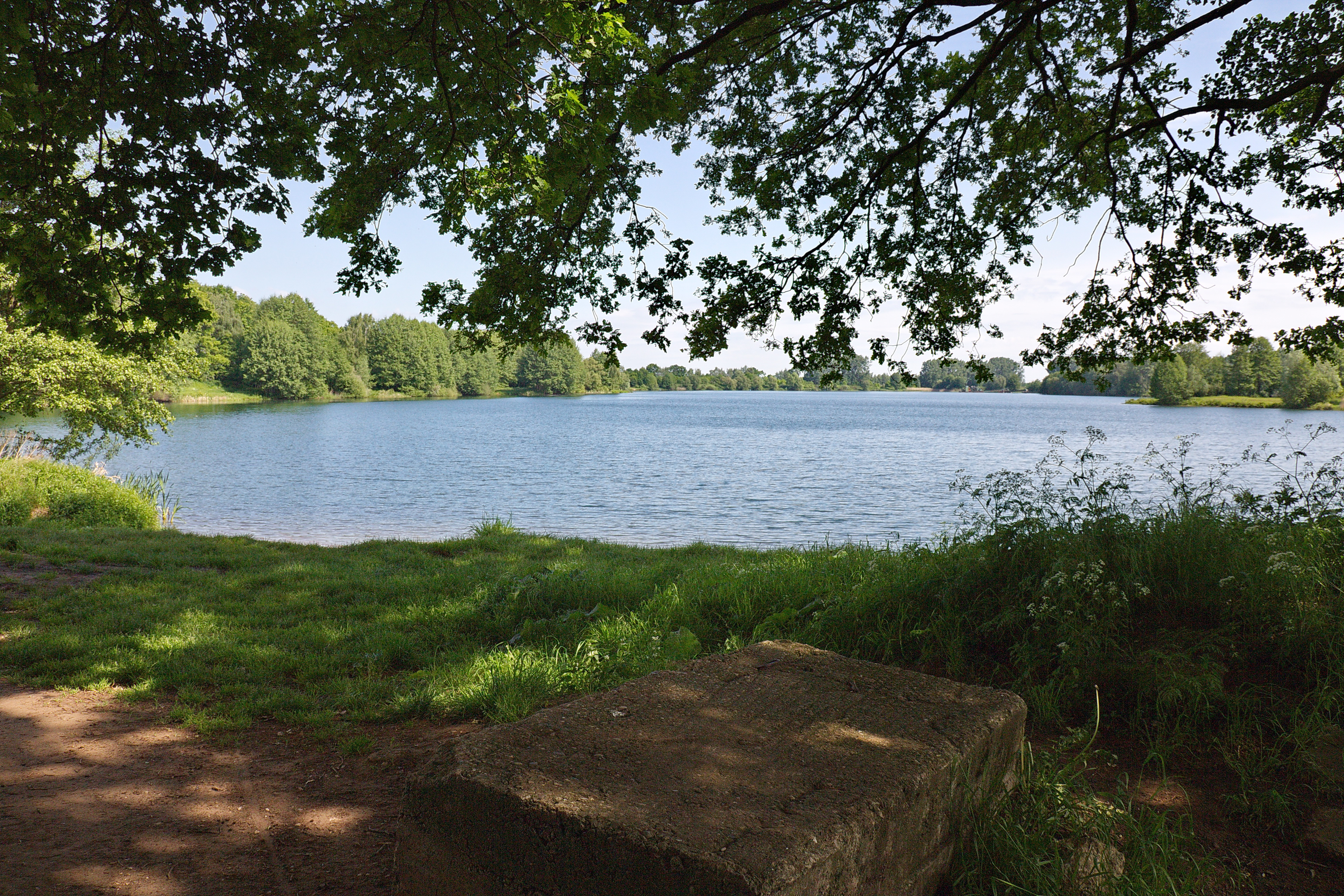

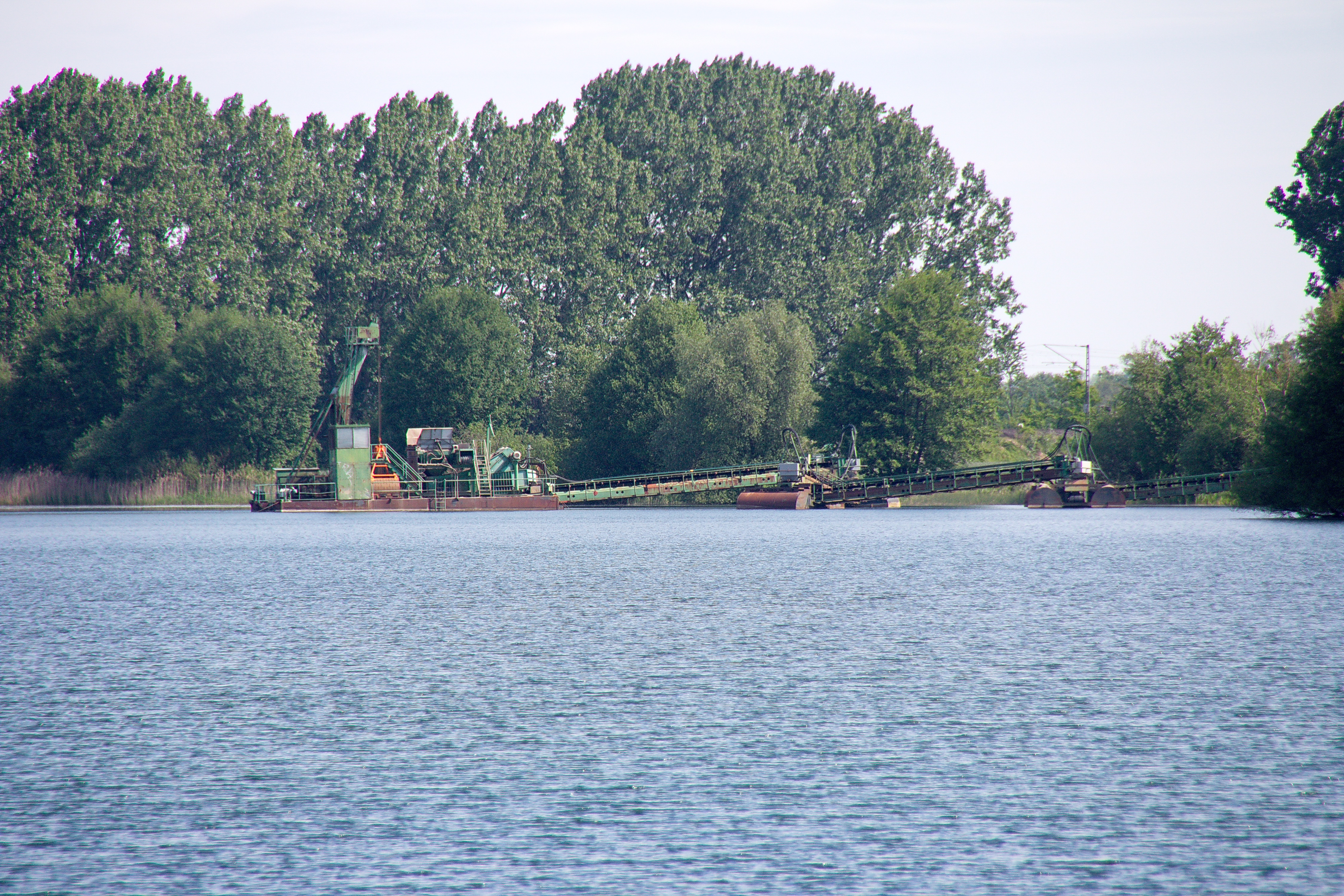

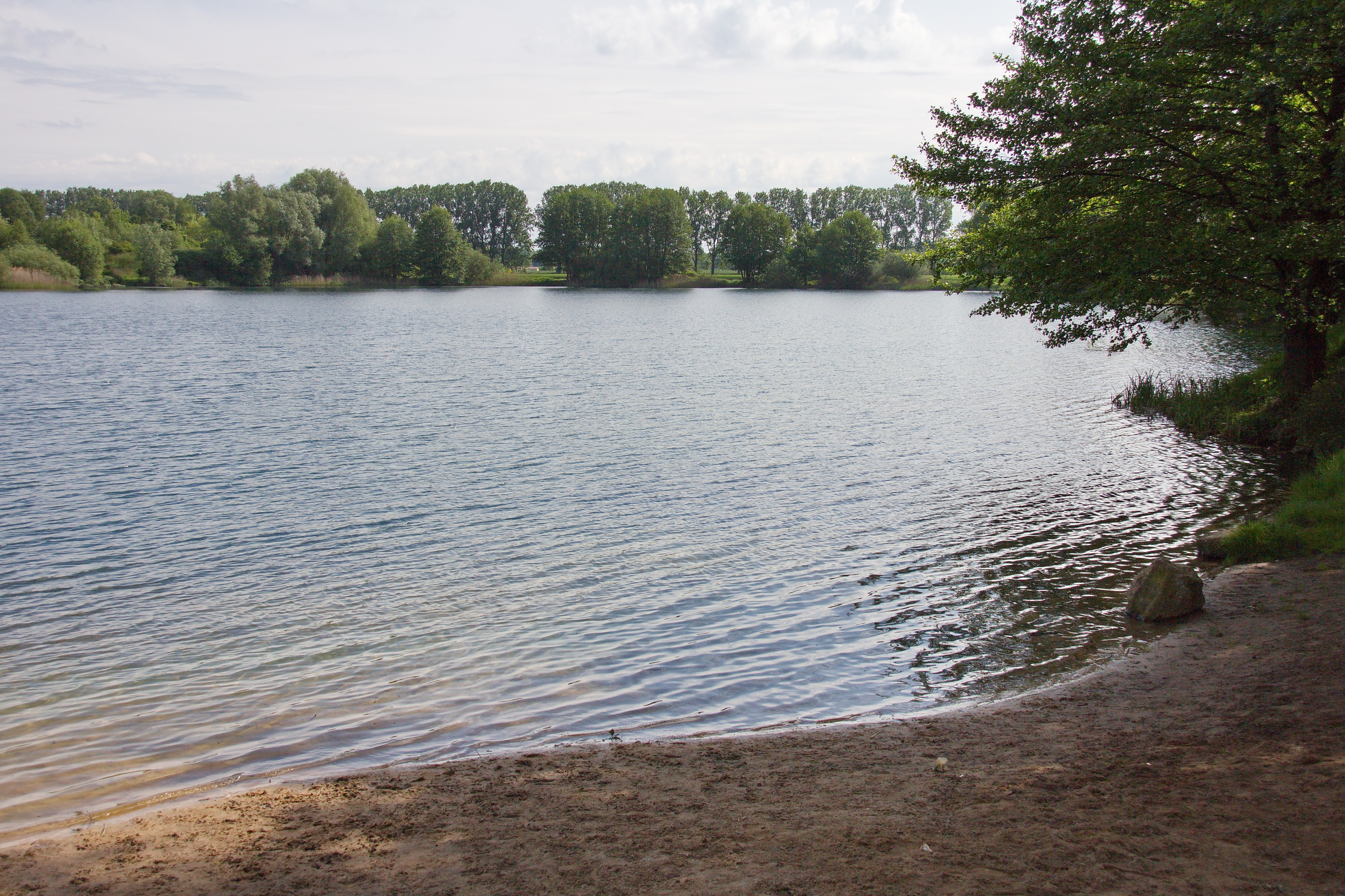

== See also ==
• List of lakes of Germany
