= Mecklenburgische Kleinseenplatte =

- Amt
- Map of Mecklenburgische Seenplatte highlighting Mecklenburgische Kleinseenplatte
- Interactive map of Mecklenburgische Kleinseenplatte
- Location within Germany Location within Mecklenburg-Vorpommern
- Coordinates: 53°16′N 12°55′E
- Country: Germany
- State: Mecklenburg-Vorpommern
- District: Mecklenburgische Seenplatte
- Seat: Mirow
- Subdivisions: 4 municipalities

Area
  - Total: 313.8 km^{2} (121.2 sq mi)

Population (2025-12-31)
  - Total: 7,708
  - Density: 24.56/km^{2} (63.62/sq mi)
- Time zone: UTC+01:00 (CET)
  - Summer (DST): UTC+02:00 (CEST)
- Website: www.amt-mecklenburgische-kleinseenplatte.de

Mecklenburgische Kleinseenplatte is an Amt in the Mecklenburgische Seenplatte district, in Mecklenburg-Vorpommern, Germany. The seat of the Amt is in Mirow.

The Amt Mecklenburgische Kleinseenplatte consists of the following municipalities:

1. Mirow
2. Priepert
3. Wesenberg
4. Wustrow
