= Wustrow, Mecklenburg-Strelitz =

Wustrow
- Municipality
- Coat of arms

- Location of Wustrow within Mecklenburgische Seenplatte district
- Interactive map of Wustrow
- Location within Germany Location within Mecklenburg-Vorpommern
- Coordinates: 53°13′N 12°57′E
- Country: Germany
- State: Mecklenburg-Vorpommern
- District: Mecklenburgische Seenplatte
- Municipal assoc.: Mecklenburgische Kleinseenplatte

Government
  - Mayor: Eberhard Zimmermann

Area
  - Total: 43.29 km^{2} (16.71 sq mi)
- Elevation: 70 m (230 ft)

Population (2025-12-31)
  - Total: 750
  - Density: 17/km^{2} (45/sq mi)
- Time zone: UTC+01:00 (CET)
  - Summer (DST): UTC+02:00 (CEST)
- Postal codes: 17255
- Dialling codes: 039828, 039832
- Vehicle registration: MST

Wustrow (German pronunciation: [ˈvʊstʁoː]) is a municipality in the Mecklenburgische Seenplatte district, in Mecklenburg-Vorpommern, Germany.
