= Großer Pälitzsee =

Lake in Mecklenburg-Vorpommern, Germany

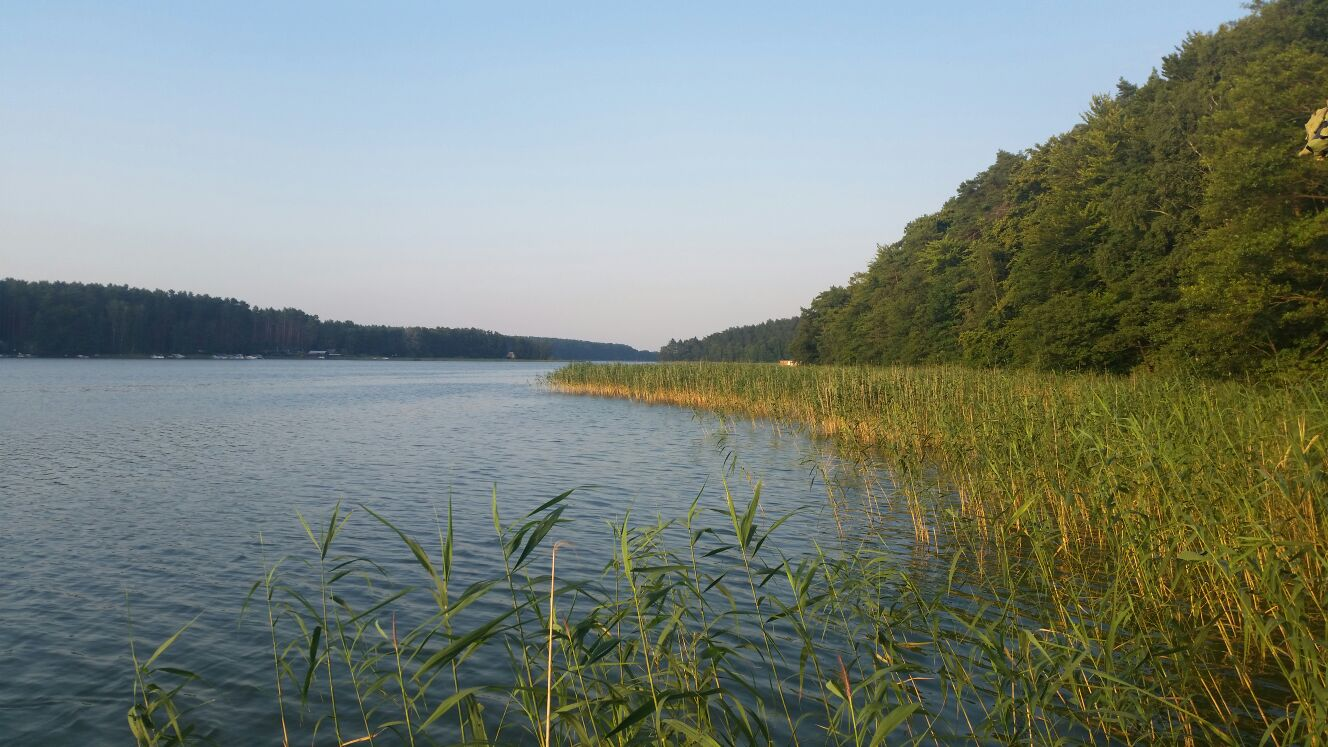
- Bay on the south-eastern bank (at the south-western end) of the Großer Pälitzsee with a view to the east-northeast

- Location within Mecklenburg-Vorpommern
- Location: Mecklenburgische Seenplatte, Mecklenburg-Vorpommern
- Coordinates: 53°11′9.15404″N 12°58′13.40515″E
- Primary inflows: Müritz–Havel–Wasserstraße
- Primary outflows: Müritz–Havel–Wasserstraße, Reeksgraben
- Basin countries: Germany
- Surface area: 2.58 km^{2} (1.00 mi^{2})
- Max. depth: 33 m (108 ft)
- Surface elevation: 56.1 m (184 ft)

Großer Pälitzsee is a lake in the Mecklenburgische Seenplatte district in Mecklenburg-Vorpommern, Germany. At an elevation of 56.1 metres (184 ft), its surface area is 2.58 square kilometres (1.00 sq mi).

At Strasen, at the eastern end of the lake, a canal and lock gives access to the Ellbogensee and the navigable River Havel.
