= Mechower See =

Lake in Mecklenburg-Vorpommern, Germany

- Location within Mecklenburg-Vorpommern

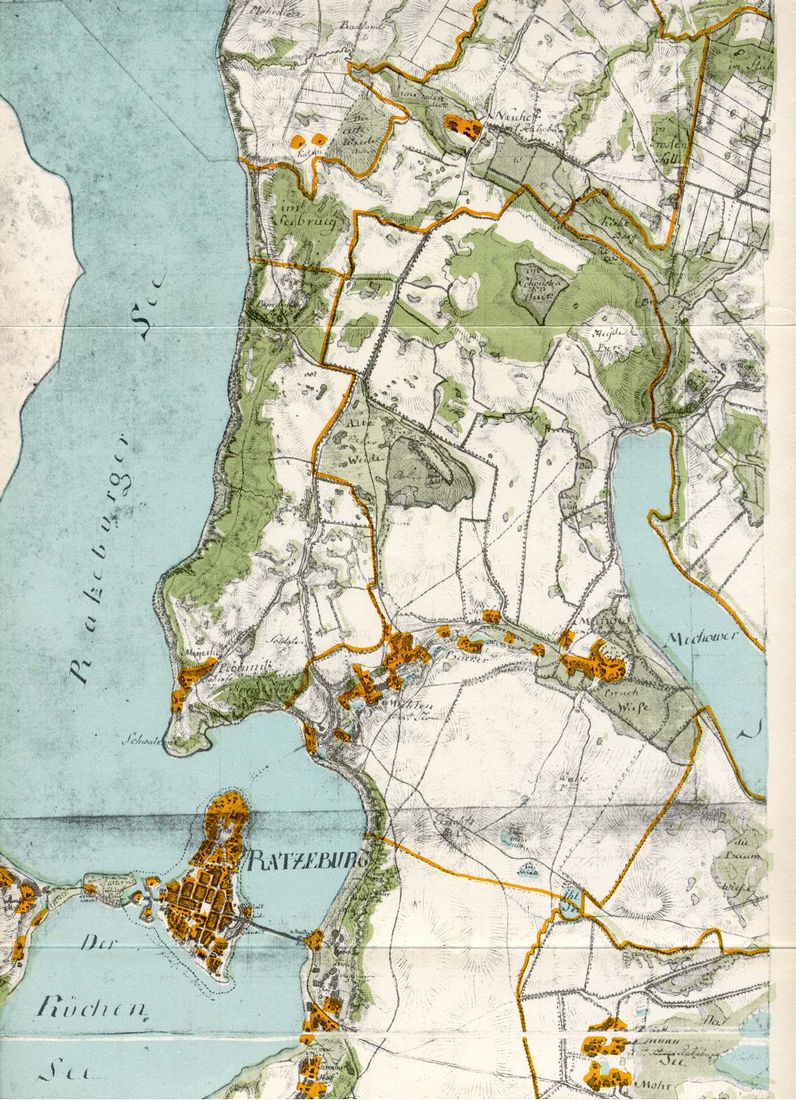
- Location: Nordwestmecklenburg, Mecklenburg-Vorpommern
- Coordinates: 53°42′55″N 10°49′21″E
- Primary inflows: Bäk, Schlagbrügger Graben
- Primary outflows: Bäk
- Basin countries: Germany
- Surface area: 1.64 km^{2} (0.63 sq mi)
- Average depth: 4 m (13 ft)
- Max. depth: 9 m (30 ft)
- Surface elevation: 31.5 m (103 ft)

Mechower See is a lake in the Nordwestmecklenburg district in Mecklenburg-Vorpommern, Germany. At an elevation of 31.5 m, its surface area is 1.64 km^{2}.

During the division of Germany, the lake marked the Inner German border, as it was located in the immediate restricted zone of the border and only accessible to Border Troops of the German Democratic Republic. Only a fisherman from Klocksdorf was allowed to fish the lake twice a year, and a border troop boat monitored it. The border ran directly along the south-western shore, the border barrier and the border fence were located on a hill on the north-eastern shore and were difficult to see from the west. Nevertheless, several people managed to overcome the barriers, swim across the lake and escape to West Germany. Although the lake is now surrounded by dense tree cover, it was completely free of trees at the time of the division of Germany. After the fall of the Wall, the border between Wietingsbek and Schlagbrügge was ceremoniously opened on Lake Mechow on December 31, 1989.

== See also ==
- List of lakes in Germany
