= Wangnitzsee =

Lake in Germany

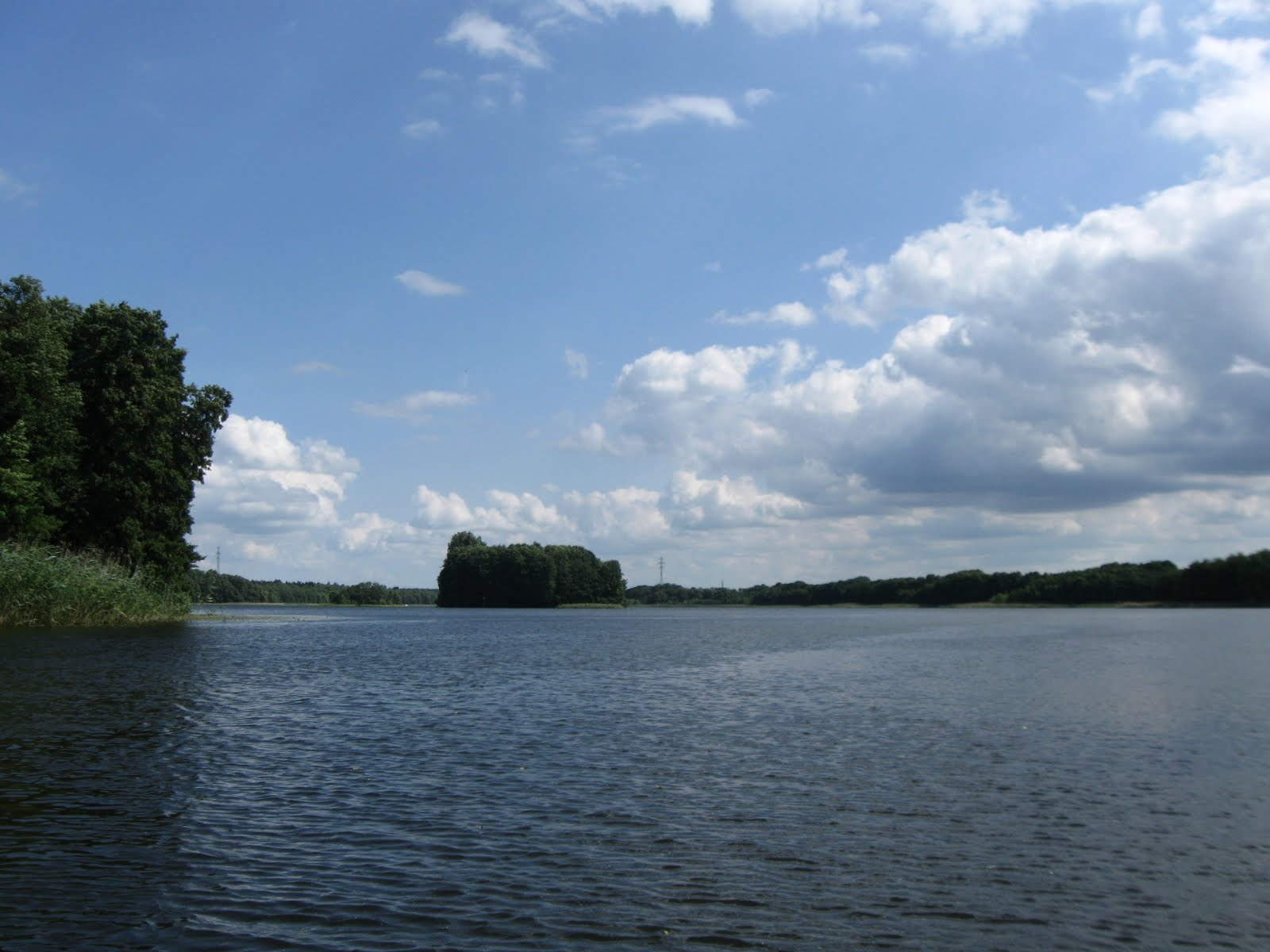
- The north coast of Wangnitzsee

- Location within Mecklenburg-Vorpommern
- Location: Priepert, Mecklenburg-Vorpommern
- Coordinates: 53°14′37″N 13°3′59″E
- Primary inflows: River Havel
- Primary outflows: River Havel
- Basin countries: Germany
- Surface area: 1.9 square kilometres (0.73 sq mi)
- Surface elevation: 54.9 metres (180 ft)

Wangnitzsee is a lake in the Mecklenburg Lake District, in the German state of Mecklenburg-Vorpommern. It is situated in the district of Mecklenburgische Seenplatte.

The lake has an elevation of 54.9 metres (180 ft) and a surface area of 1.9 square kilometres (0.73 sq mi).

The navigable River Havel briefly flows through the Wangnitzsee, both entering and exiting at the west end of the lake. The river enters from a 7.2 kilometres (4.5 mi) channel from Wesenberg and the Woblitzsee, and exiting directly into the Großer Priepertsee. The lake itself is navigable to its eastern end, and navigation is administered as part of the Obere–Havel–Wasserstraße.
