= Hohnsensee =

Lake in Germany

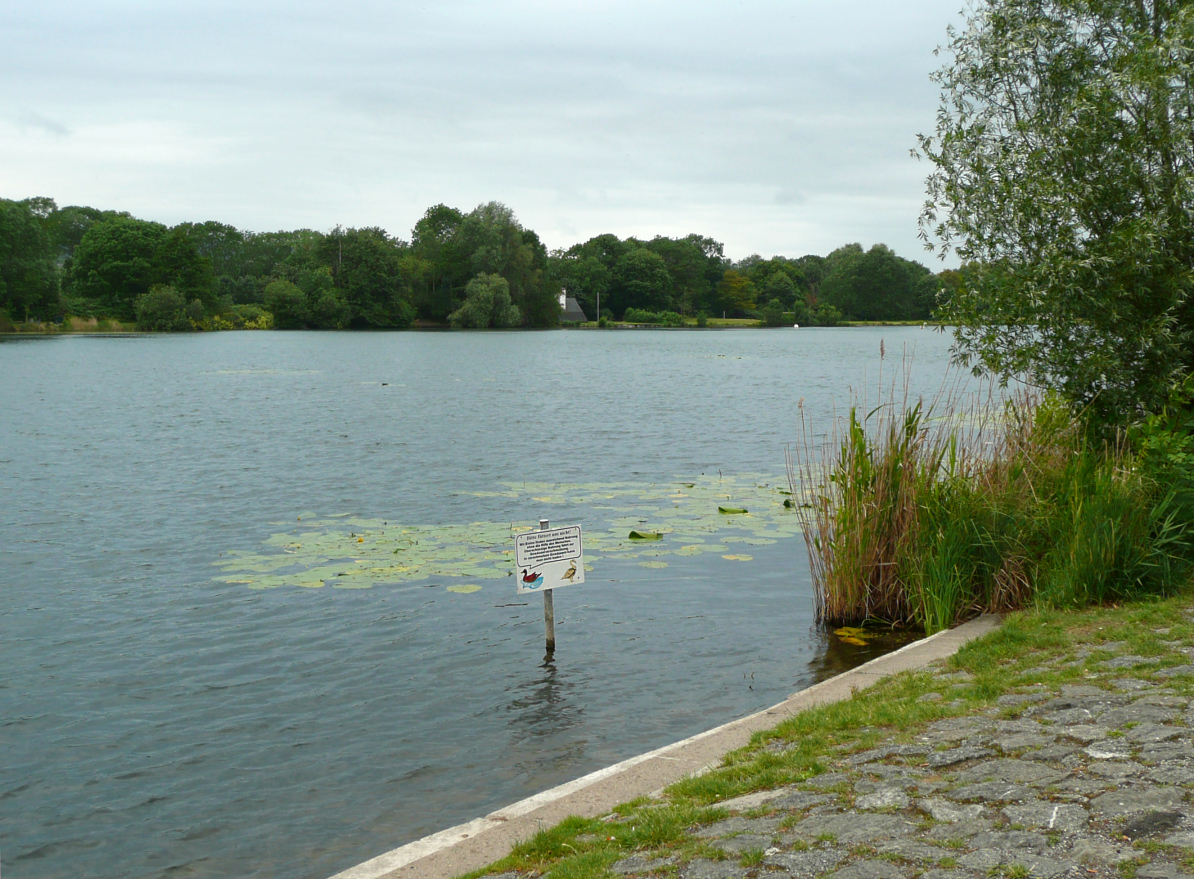
- Hohnsensee, June 2011

- Location within Lower Saxony Location within Germany
- Location: Hildesheim, Lower Saxony, Germany
- Coordinates: 52°08′N 9°57′E
- Type: Flooded gravel pit
- Primary inflows: none
- Basin countries: Germany
- Max. length: 500 metres (1,600 ft)
- Max. width: 250 metres (820 ft)
- Surface area: 9.28 hectares (22.9 acres)
- Average depth: 4 metres (13 ft)
- Max. depth: 8 metres (26 ft)
- Surface elevation: 85 metres (279 ft)

The Hohnsensee is a lake in Hildesheim, Lower Saxony, Germany, covering 9.3 hectares.

It is located south of Neustadt between the street Hohnsen, the Innerste, the outdoor pool Johanniswiese and the washland of the Innerste. It was created by gravel mining from 1966 to 1974 and is named after the abandoned village Hohnsen.

The northern part of the Hohnsensee is part of the open-air swimming pool Johanniswiese, and includes a 150 m long sand beach.

== See also ==
- List of lakes of Germany
