= Ellbogensee =

Body of water

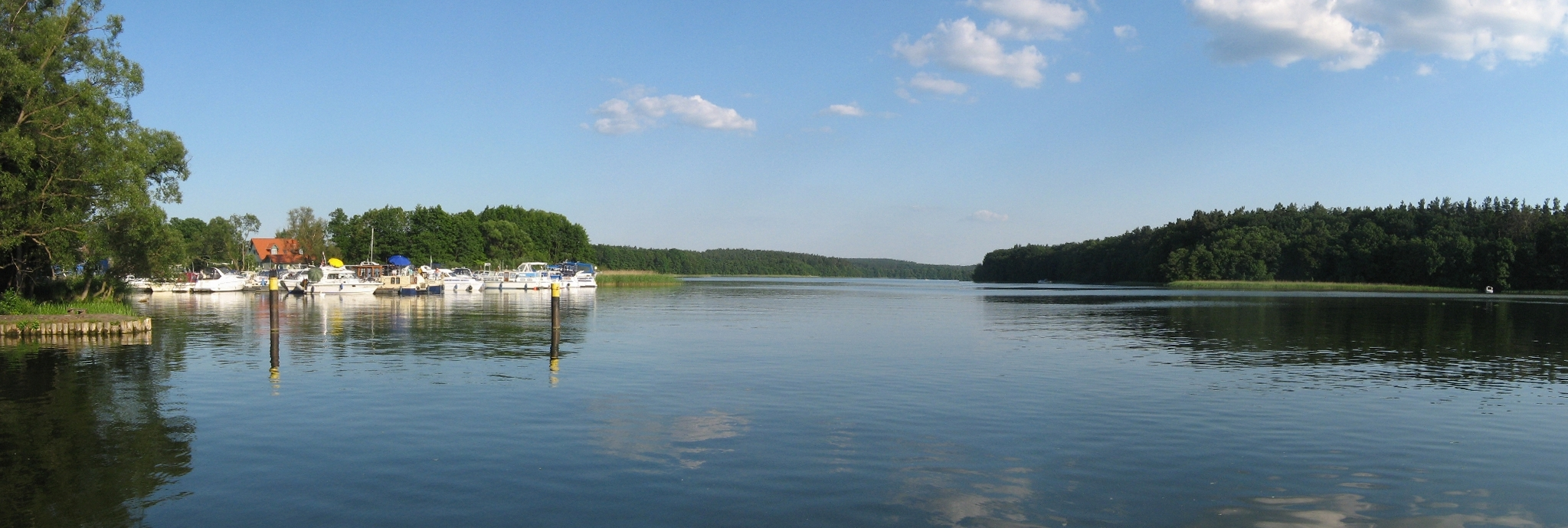

- Location within Mecklenburg-Vorpommern
- Location: Mecklenburgische Seenplatte, Mecklenburg-Vorpommern
- Coordinates: 53°12′26″N 13°02′15″E
- Primary inflows: River Havel
- Primary outflows: River Havel
- Basin countries: Germany
- Surface area: 1.55 square kilometres (0.60 sq mi)
- Max. depth: 17 metres (56 ft)
- Surface elevation: 54.8 metres (180 ft)

Ellbogensee (German, 'Elbow Lake') is a lake in the Mecklenburg Lake District, in Germany. Although most of the lake is in the district of Mecklenburgische Seenplatte in the state of Mecklenburg-Vorpommern, a portion of its southern shore is in the state of Brandenburg. It has a distinctive shape, reflecting its name.

The lake has an elevation of 54.8 metres (180 ft) and a surface area of 1.55 square kilometres (0.60 sq mi).

The navigable River Havel flows through the Ellbogensee, entering it at Priepert via a 0.6-kilometre (0.37 mi) long channel from the Großer Priepertsee to the north, and exiting via a 0.3-kilometre (0.19 mi) long channel to the Ziernsee to the east. At Strasen, at the western end of the lake, a canal and lock gives access to the Großer Pälitzsee, forming the first link of the Müritz–Havel–Wasserstraße. Navigation is administered as part of the Obere–Havel–Wasserstraße.
