= Halbendorfer See =

Lake in Saxony, Germany

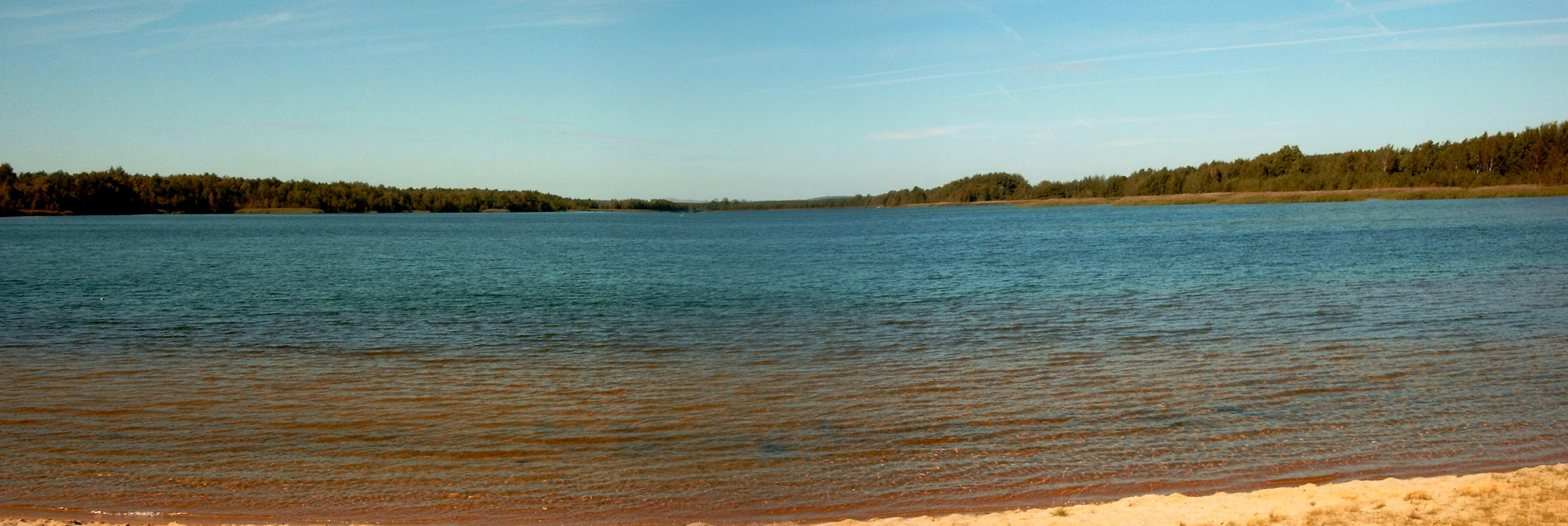

- Location within Saxony
- Location: Saxony
- Coordinates: 51°32′24″N 14°34′15″E
- Basin countries: Germany
- Max. length: 2 km (1.2 mi)
- Max. width: 0.5 km (0.31 mi)
- Surface area: ca. 80 ha (200 acres)
- Max. depth: 26 m (85 ft)

Halbendorfer See is a lake in Saxony, Germany. Its surface area is ca. 80 ha.
