= Drielaker See =

Coastal lake in Oldenburg, Niedersachsen, Germany

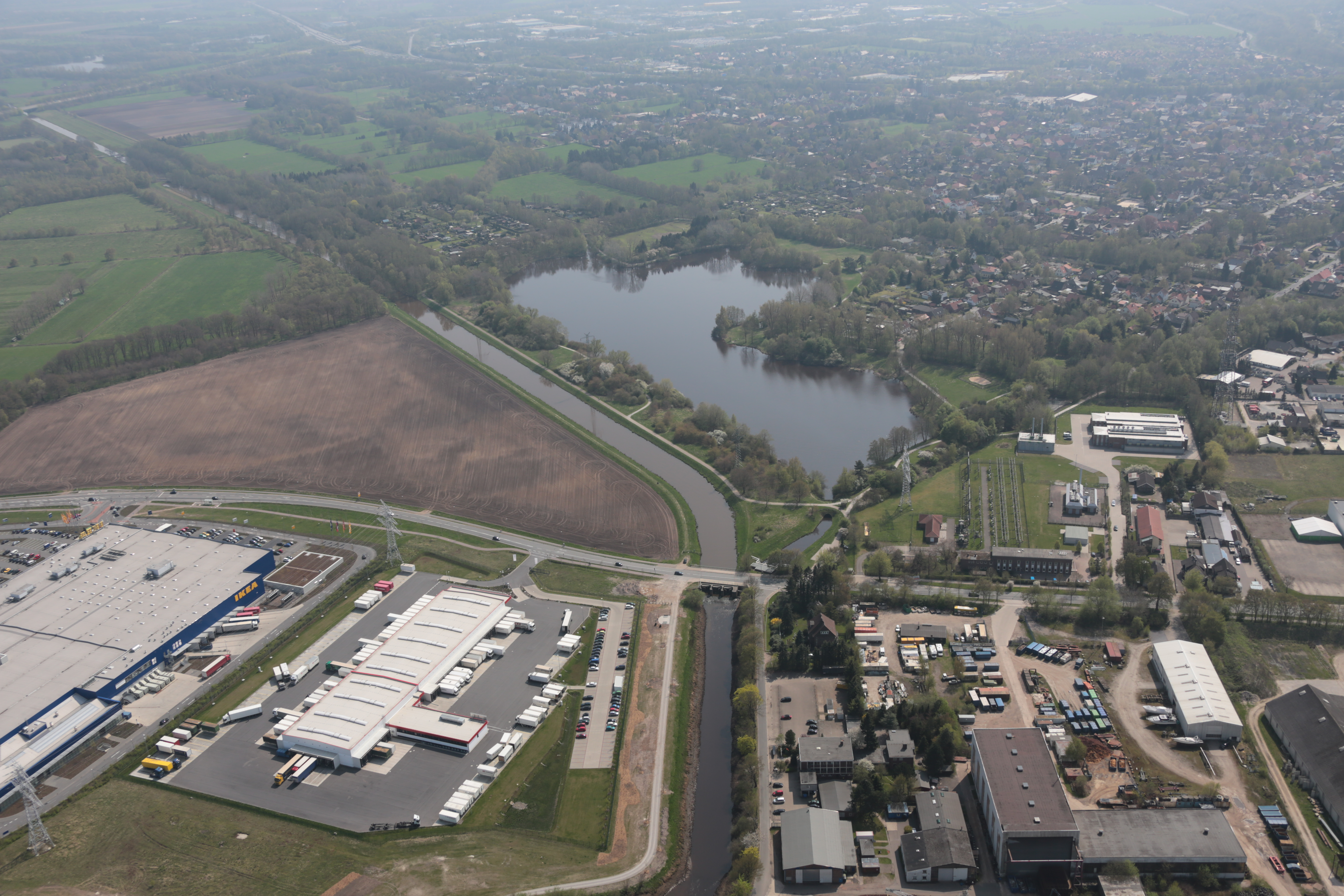
- Aerial View of the Drielaker See from the North, May 2013

- Location within Lower Saxony
- Coordinates: 53°8′4″N 8°15′8″E
- Primary inflows: Drielaker Kanal
- Primary outflows: Drielaker Kanal
- Basin countries: Germany
- Max. length: 0.6 km (0 mi)
- Max. width: 0.3 km (0 mi)
- Surface area: 10.4 ha (25.70 acres)
- Average depth: 17 m (56 ft)

The Drielaker See is a coastal lake in Osternburg subdistrict of Drielake in the municipal area of Oldenburg, Niedersachsen.

== Description ==
The 10.4 ha lake was created during the construction of the Autobahn A 29 in the 1980s. The reason for this evacuation was for the construction of the ramps for the 26 meter high motorway viaduct. Today it is used a recreational area with close proximity to the port and commercial areas.

The Drielaker See is used by the Sport Fishing Club of Oldenburg (Sportfischer-Verein Oldenburg e.V.) for angling. The Hemmelsbäker Canal runs directly from the northeastern side of the lake, which leads into the Hunte about 100 meters further north.
