= Priepert =

- Municipality
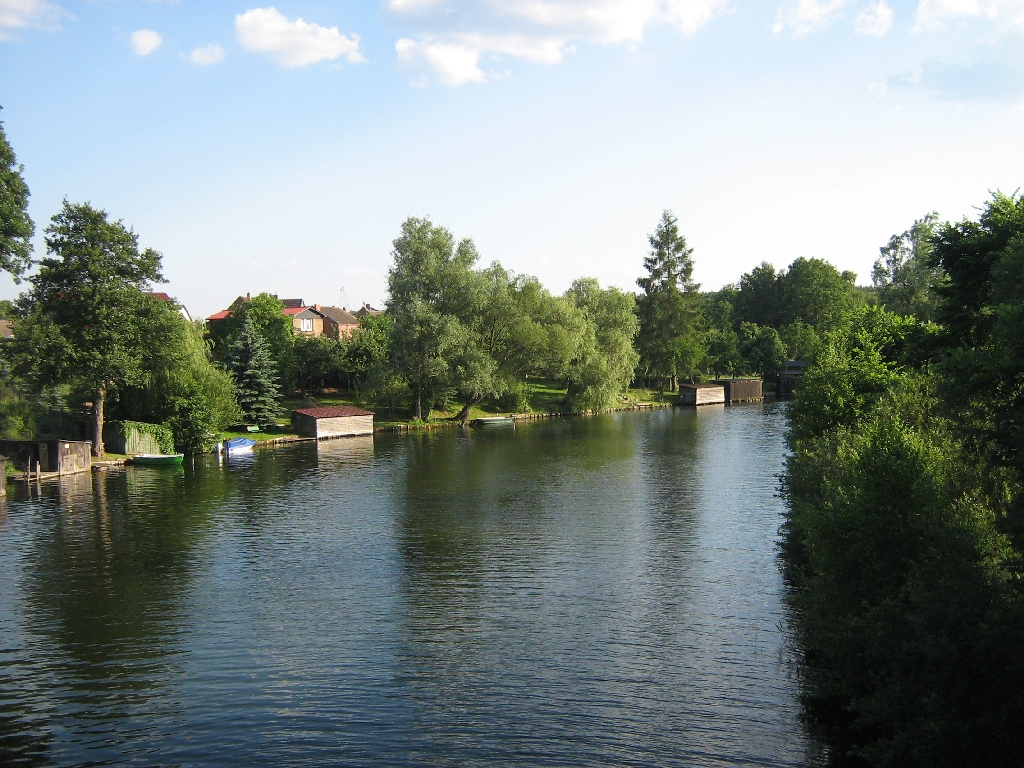
- The Havel in Priepert

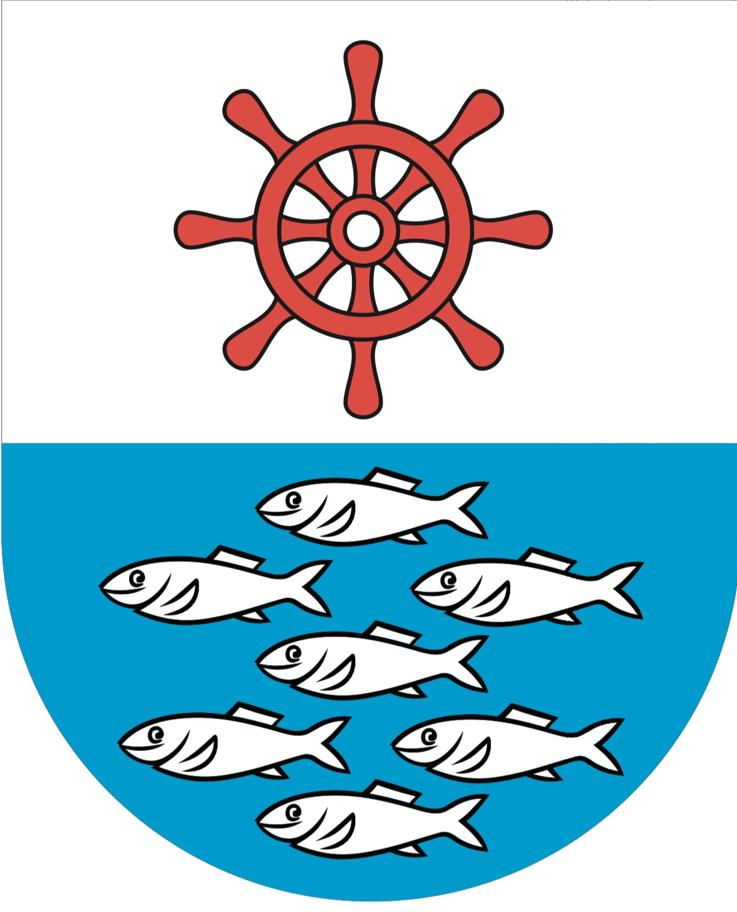
- Coat of arms

- Location of Priepert within Mecklenburgische Seenplatte district
- Interactive map of Priepert
- Location within Germany Location within Mecklenburg-Vorpommern
- Coordinates: 53°13′6″N 13°02′20″E
- Country: Germany
- State: Mecklenburg-Vorpommern
- District: Mecklenburgische Seenplatte
- Municipal assoc.: Mecklenburgische Kleinseenplatte

Government
  - Mayor: Claus Menschel

Area
  - Total: 22.56 km^{2} (8.71 sq mi)
- Elevation: 66 m (217 ft)

Population (2025-12-31)
  - Total: 315
  - Density: 14.0/km^{2} (36.2/sq mi)
- Time zone: UTC+01:00 (CET)
  - Summer (DST): UTC+02:00 (CEST)
- Postal codes: 17255
- Dialling codes: 039828
- Vehicle registration: MST
- Website: www.priepert.de

Priepert is a municipality in the district Mecklenburgische Seenplatte, in Mecklenburg-Vorpommern, Germany. It is situated on the River Havel between the lakes of Großer Priepertsee and Ellbogensee.
