= Großer Priepertsee =

Lake in Mecklenburg-Vorpommern, Germany

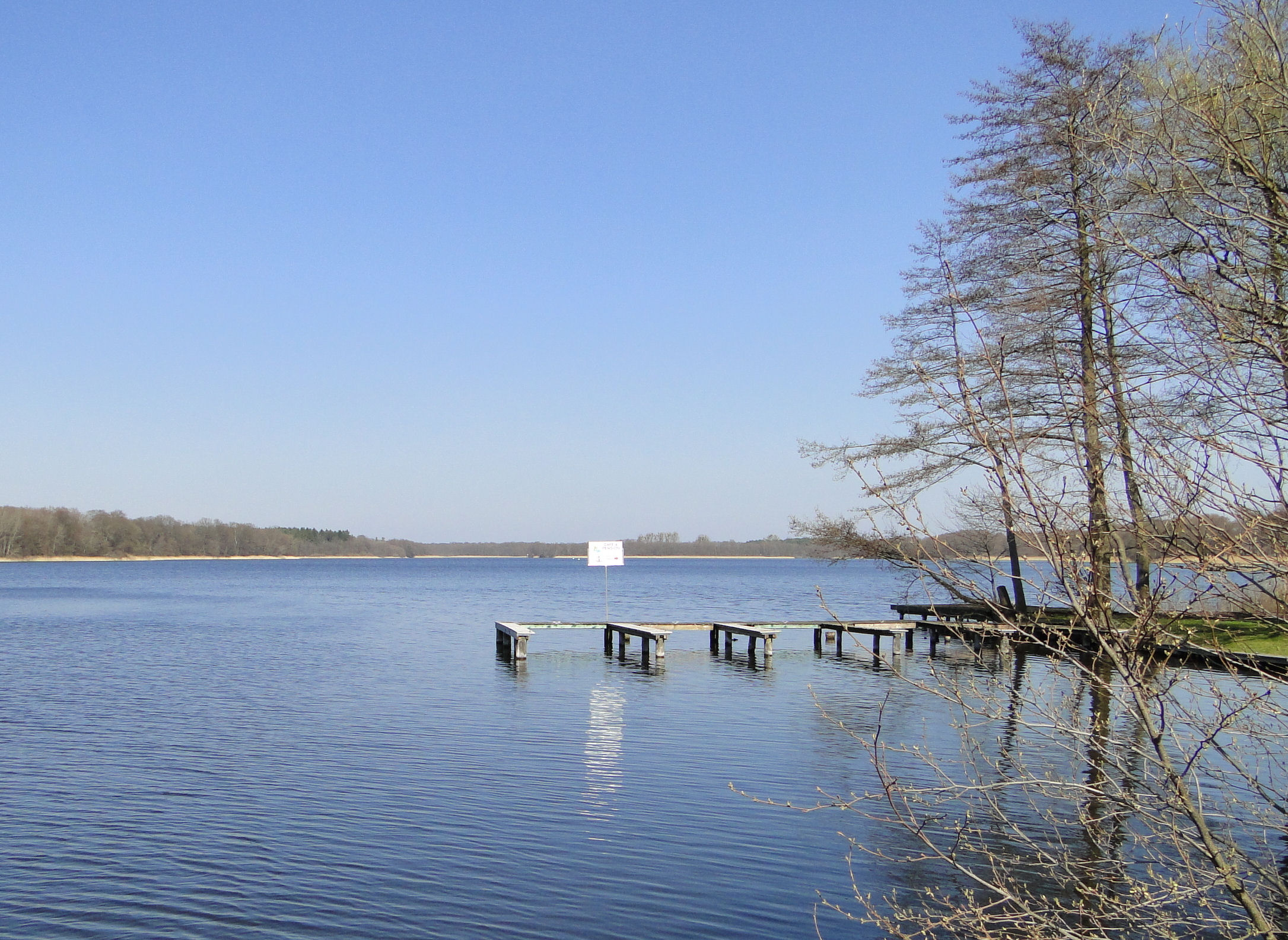

- Location within Mecklenburg-Vorpommern
- Location: Mecklenburgische Seenplatte, Mecklenburg-Vorpommern
- Coordinates: 53°13′34.62″N 13°2′29.87″E
- Primary inflows: River Havel
- Primary outflows: River Havel
- Basin countries: Germany
- Surface area: 1.04 square kilometres (0.40 sq mi)
- Max. depth: 32 metres (105 ft)
- Surface elevation: 54.9 metres (180 ft)

Großer Priepertsee is a lake in the Mecklenburg Lake District, in the German state of Mecklenburg-Vorpommern. It is in the district of Mecklenburgische Seenplatte.

The lake has an elevation of 54.9 metres (180 ft) and a surface area of 1.04 square kilometres (0.40 sq mi).

The navigable River Havel flows the length of the Großer Priepertsee, entering it directly from the connecting Wangnitzsee to the north, and leaving it at Priepert via a 0.6-kilometre (0.37 mi) long channel to the Ellbogensee to the south. Navigation is administered as part of the Obere–Havel–Wasserstraße.
