= Norderteich =

Lake in North Rhine-Westphalia, Germany

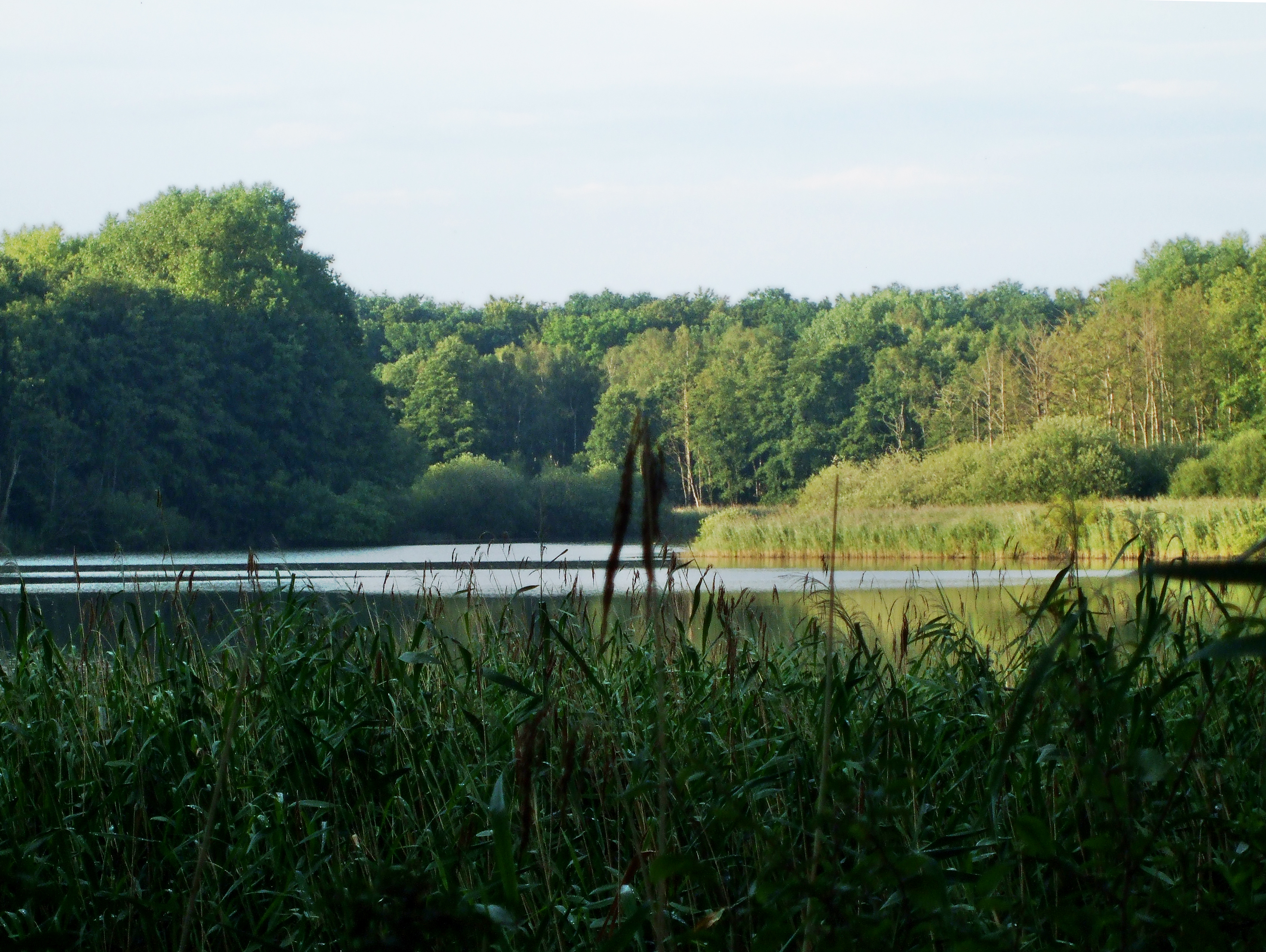

- Location within North Rhine-Westphalia
- Location: North Rhine-Westphalia
- Coordinates: 51.88465°N 9.032371°E
- Primary inflows: Niederbeller Bach, Abach
- Primary outflows: Napte, Emmer
- Basin countries: Germany
- Max. length: 600 m (2,000 ft)
- Max. width: 500 m (1,600 ft)
- Surface area: 12.5 ha (31 acres)
- Average depth: 3 m (9.8 ft)
- Surface elevation: 153 m (502 ft)

Norderteich is a lake in North Rhine-Westphalia, Germany. At an elevation of 153 m, its surface area is 12.5 ha.
