= Viereggenhöfer Teich =

Lake in Germany

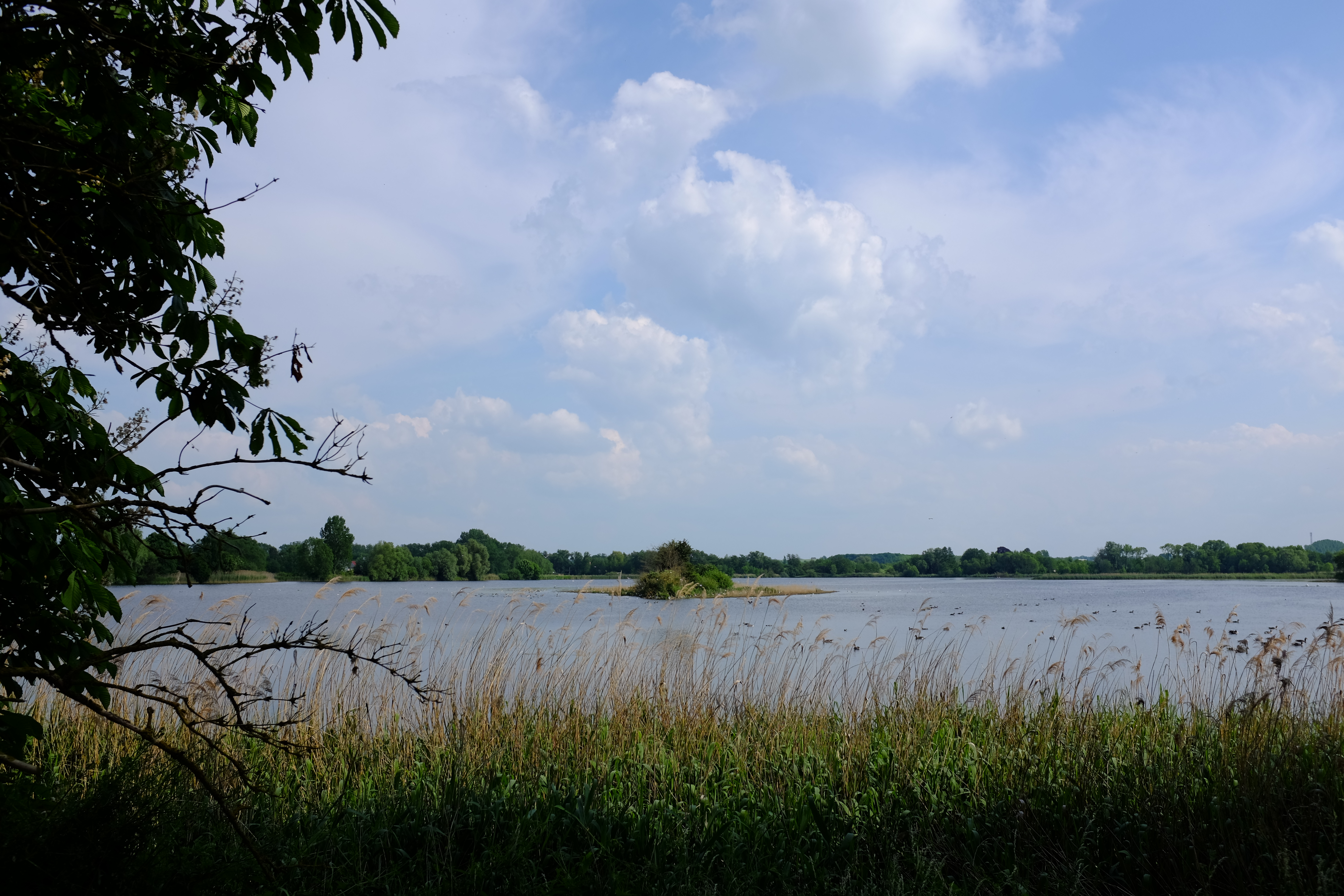
- view of Viereggenhöfer Teich

- Location within Mecklenburg-Vorpommern
- Location: Wismar, Mecklenburg-Vorpommern
- Coordinates: 53°52′26.36″N 11°27′33.32″E
- Basin countries: Germany
- Surface area: 37 ha (91 acres)
- Surface elevation: 8 m (26 ft)
- Settlements: Wismar

Viereggenhöfer Teich is a lake in Wismar, Mecklenburg-Vorpommern, Germany. At an elevation of 8 m, its surface area is 0.37 km^{2}.
