= Berliner Verkehrsblätter =

German transport periodical

- Founder(s): Siegfried Münzinger and Wolfgang Kramer
- Founded: 1954; 72 years ago
- Language: German
- Headquarters: Berlin, Germany
- Website: www.verkehrsblaetter.de

The Berliner Verkehrsblätter is a German periodical dedicated to the transport sector, published monthly since 1954. It is subtitled Informationsschrift des Arbeitskreises Berliner Nahverkehr e.V.

== History ==
Berliner Verkehrsblätter was founded in 1954 by Siegfried Münzinger and Wolfgang Kramer. It was published in 1954 and 1955 under the name Der Berliner Verkehrsamateur. The aim of the journal was to record and document the modernisation in the transport sector that began with the reconstruction with new technology and new vehicles in a traffic chronicle to be updated. The information brochure has been published monthly since the beginning and began with a free, three-page and hectographed edition of 30 copies. At the beginning of the 1970s, the volume was 20 pages and the print run was over 500 copies, still written on a hand-held matrix and duplicated by hand. Since January 1972, the Verkehrsblätter have been produced in offset printing and are now also available online. Today (as of 2018), the magazine has 20 to 24 pages in DIN A4 format and is distributed by subscription or through specialist shops.

== Topics ==
According to the Berliner Verkehrsblätter [...], the reports cover current and historical topics: Line chronicle, fleet, tariffs, museum vehicles, technology, reviews and current short news from the areas of S-Bahn, U-Bahn, railway, tram, bus and passenger shipping. Photos and illustrations supplement the reports. The topics of issue 1/2012 include, for example: Berlin steam tram 1886-1898 and milestones at the main and cemetery railway. A series of publications supplements the publications of the Berliner Verkehrsblätter. The books include a tram line chronicle from 1945 to 1993, a chronicle of the Berlin subway and a compendium of Berlin S-Bahn stations.

In addition to its publishing activities, the Berliner Verkehrsblätter participate in exhibitions, special trips, and information events.
