= Bucket Lake =

Artificial lake in Eckernförde

(Upper) Bucket Lake
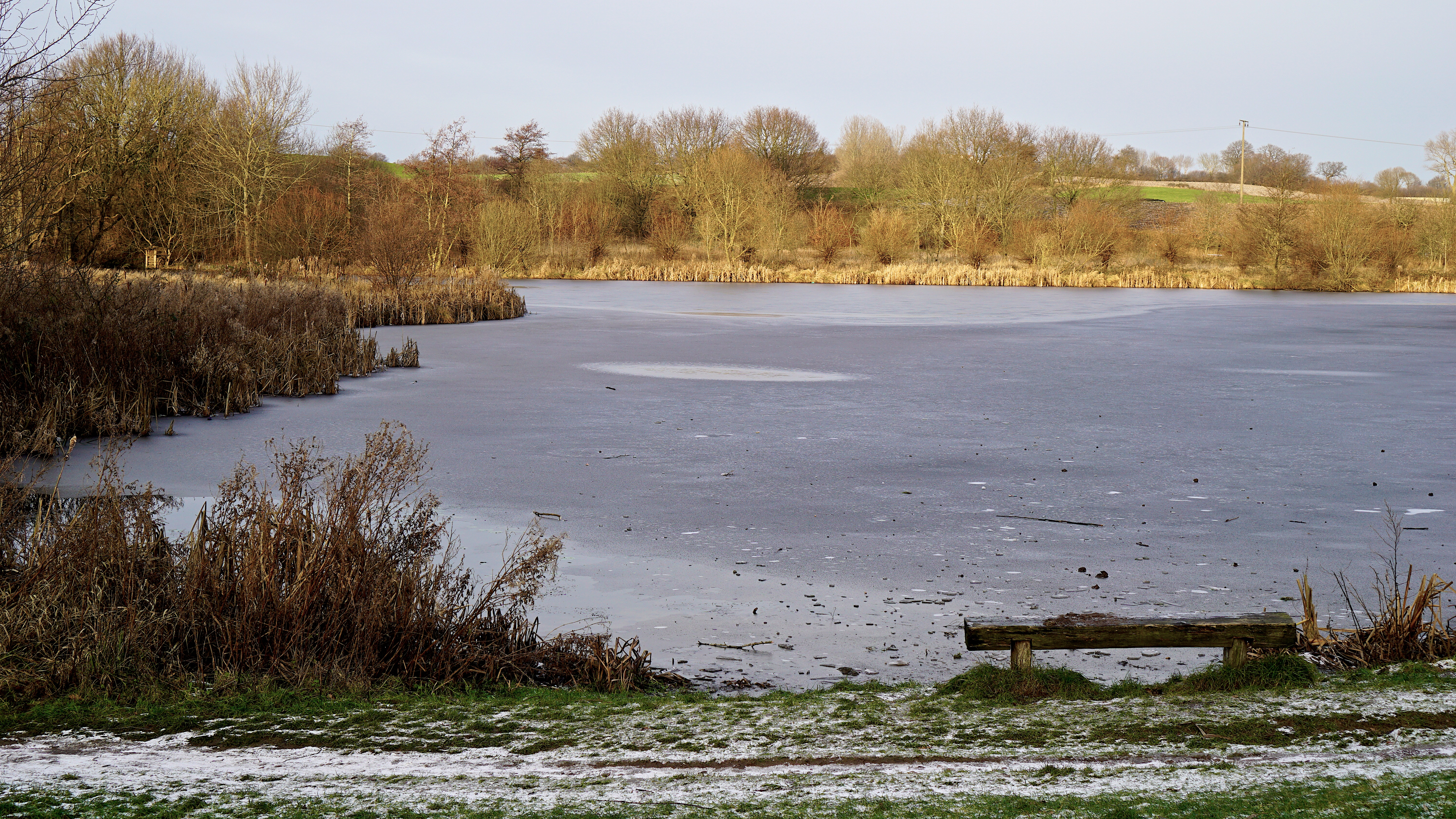

- Location within Schleswig-Holstein
- Location: Rendsburg-Eckernförde, Schleswig-Holstein
- Coordinates: 54°29′21″N 9°51′0″E
- Basin countries: Germany
- Surface area: 1.5 ha (3.7 acres)
- Max. depth: 1.5 m (4 ft 11 in)
- Surface elevation: 14 m (46 ft)
- Settlements: Eckernförde

(Upper) Bucket Lake (German: (Oberer) Eimersee) is an artificial lake and restored wetland in Rendsburg-Eckernförde, Schleswig-Holstein, Germany. It has a surface elevation of 14 m, and its surface area is 1.5 ha. The lake belongs to Eckernförde.

The creation of the lake is unique: in 1990 a polythene bucket (hence the name) was used to plug a culvert that was draining a shallow former agricultural basin. Since then, the lake has become a habitat with a huge diversity of plants and animals. This was also seen as a successful example of cheap land restoration in Japan, in South Korea and the United States.

A short documentary about the lake was shown at the Green Screen film festival, at the Matsalu Nature Film Festival in Estonia and at the Innsbruck Nature Film Festival in Austria in 2016. The documentary from German filmmaker Sven Bohde is available in German, English and Japanese.
