= Orankesee =

Lake in Berlin, Germany

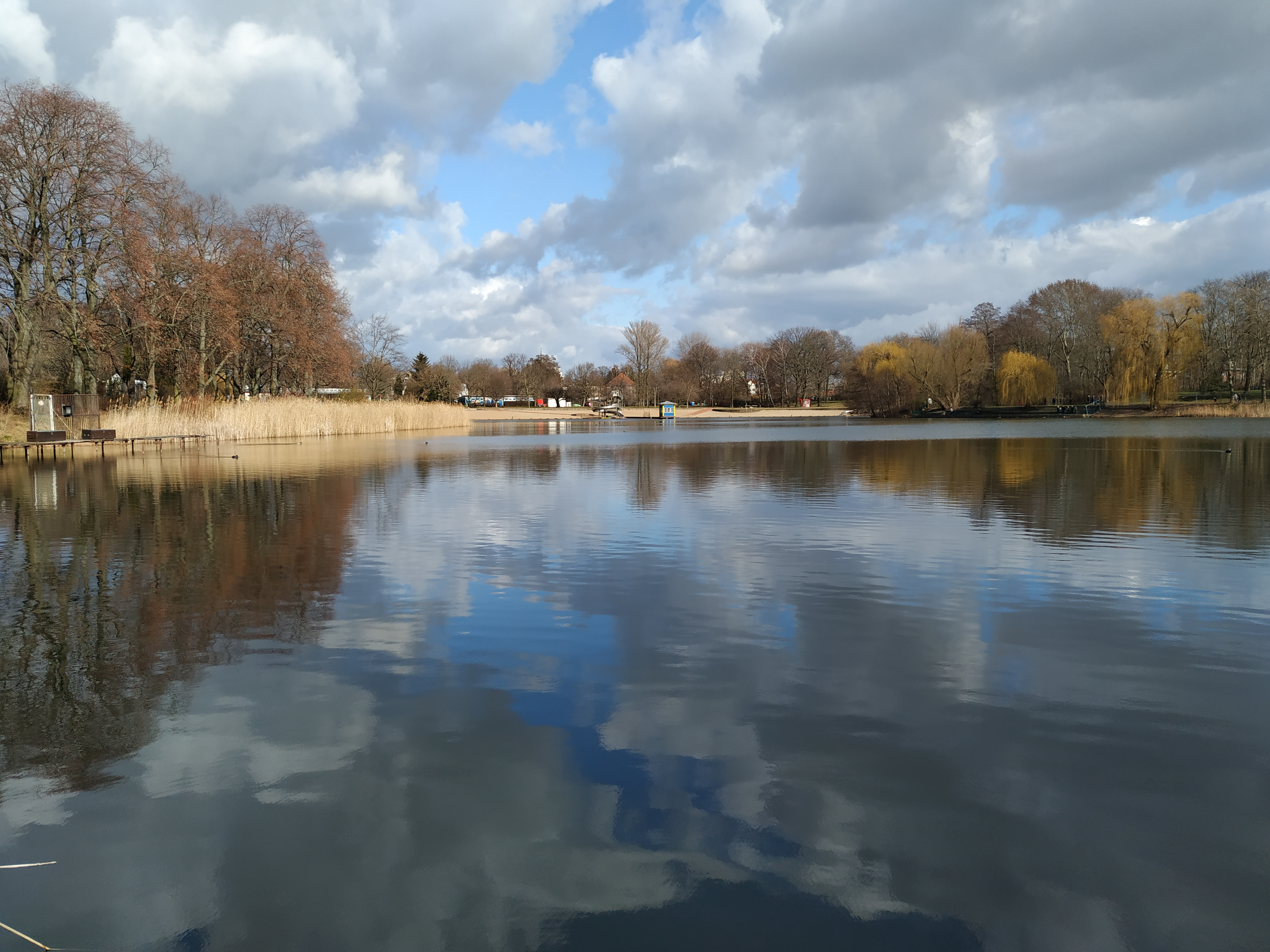

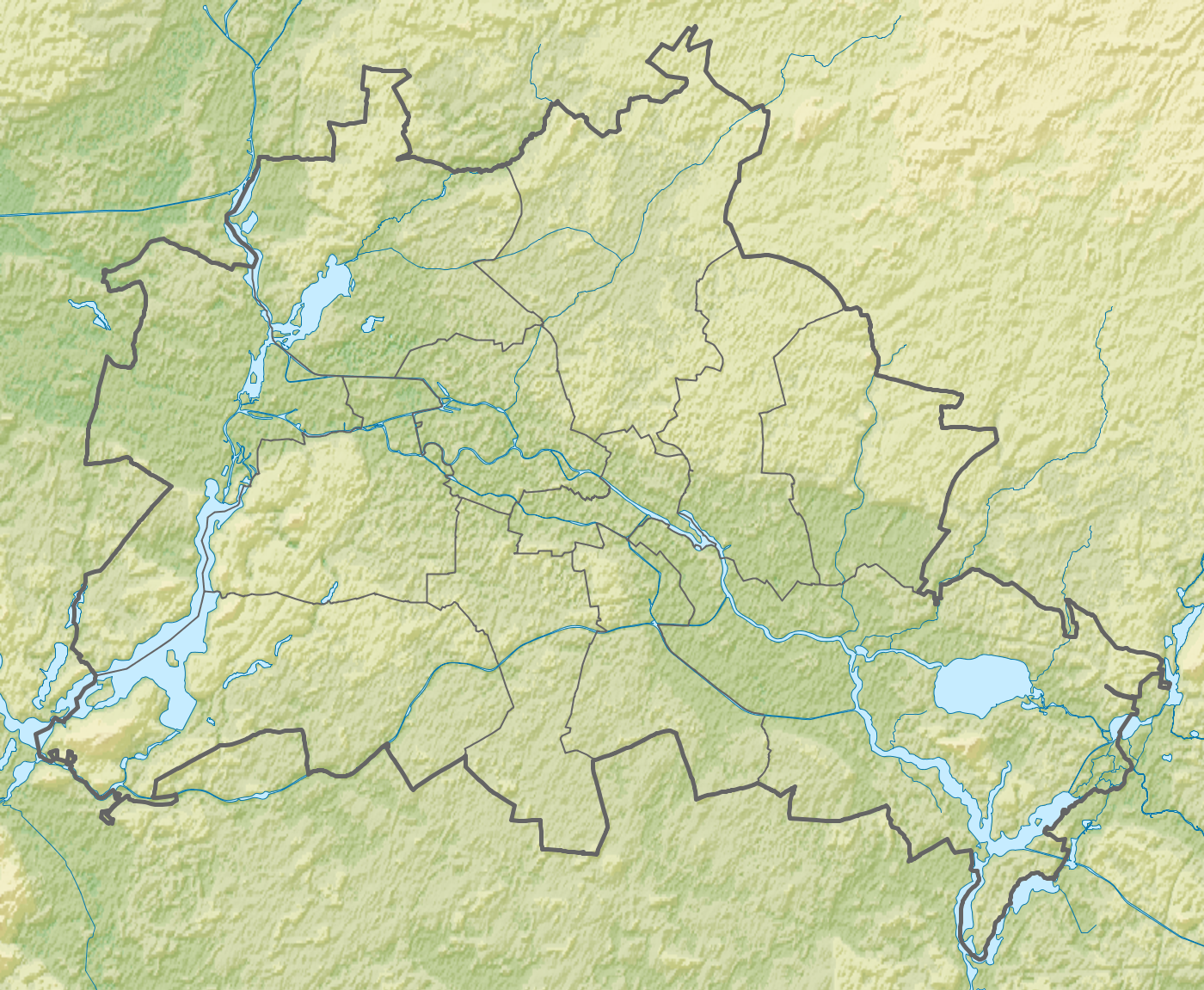
- Location within Berlin
- Location: Berlin
- Coordinates: 52°32′56″N 13°28′57″E
- Basin countries: Germany
- Surface area: 4.0546 hectares (10.019 acres)
- Average depth: 2.62 m (8 ft 7 in)
- Max. depth: 6.72 m (22.0 ft)
- Water volume: 106,050 m^{3} (3,745,000 cu ft)
- Shore length^{1}: 0.94 km (0.58 mi)
- Settlements: Berlin-Alt-Hohenschönhausen
- ^{1} Shore length is not a well-defined measure.

Orankesee is a lake in Berlin, Germany. Its surface area is 4.0546 hectares (10.019 acres). The Orankesee is a lake without inflow or outflow. Together with the nearby Obersee lake, it forms the center around which the Hohenschönhausen villa quarter developed. The Orankesee belongs to a chain of glacial lakes that extends from the Barnim plateau to the Berlin Urstromtal. The name Oranke derives from the Slavic word Roderanke, meaning “reddish-brown lake.”
