= Minden Aqueduct =

Aqueduct near Minden, North Rhine-Westphalia, Germany

Coordinates: 52°18′11″N 8°55′54″E

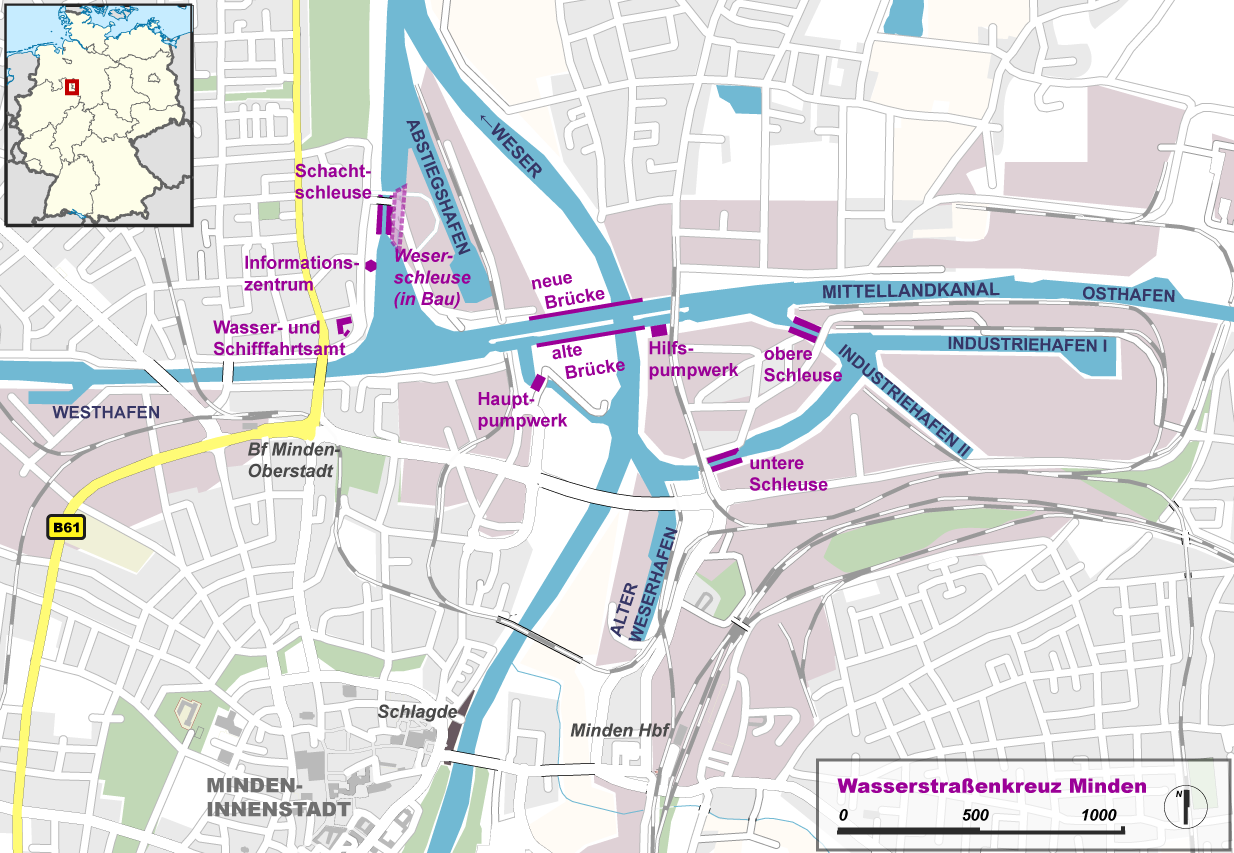
Location of the buildings of the waterways' intersection

The Minden Aqueduct (German: Wasserstraßenkreuz Minden) is an aqueduct near Minden, North Rhine-Westphalia, Germany. It actually consists of two parallel water bridges, that lead the Mittelland Canal over the Weser. The older of the two bridges is no longer used for shipping. After the Magdeburg Water Bridge, it is the second biggest aqueduct in Europe.

The aqueduct is part of an intersection of waterways: the Mittelland Canal is connected with the Weser by two branch, or link, canals.

== Canal bridge ==
=== Old bridge ===
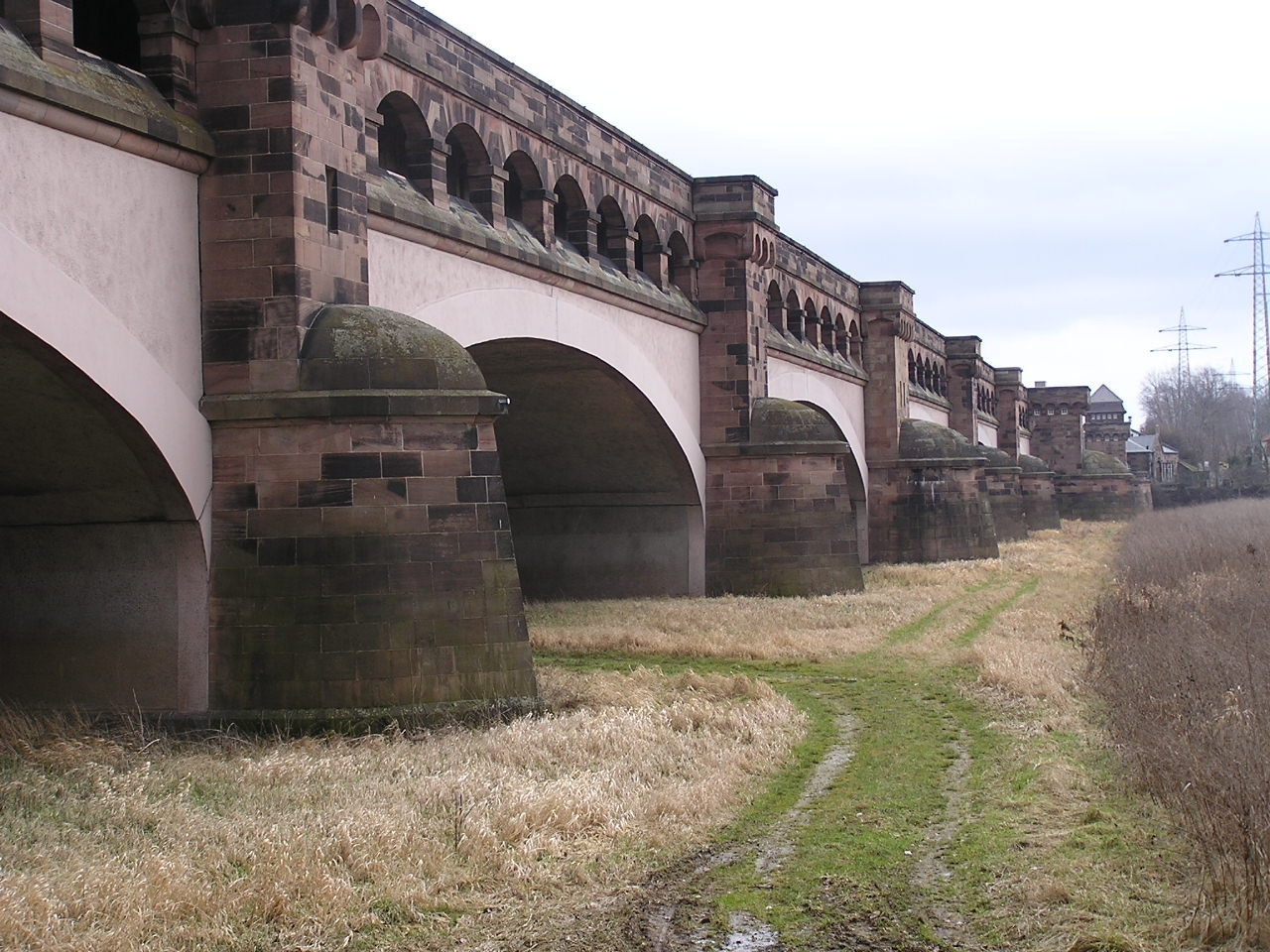
The old canal bridge

The first canal bridge over the river Weser was built in 1914. It is a 370-metre-long concrete construction. At the end of World War II it was destroyed by the retreating Wehrmacht in 1945. In 1949, the renovated bridge was re-opened.

=== New bridge ===
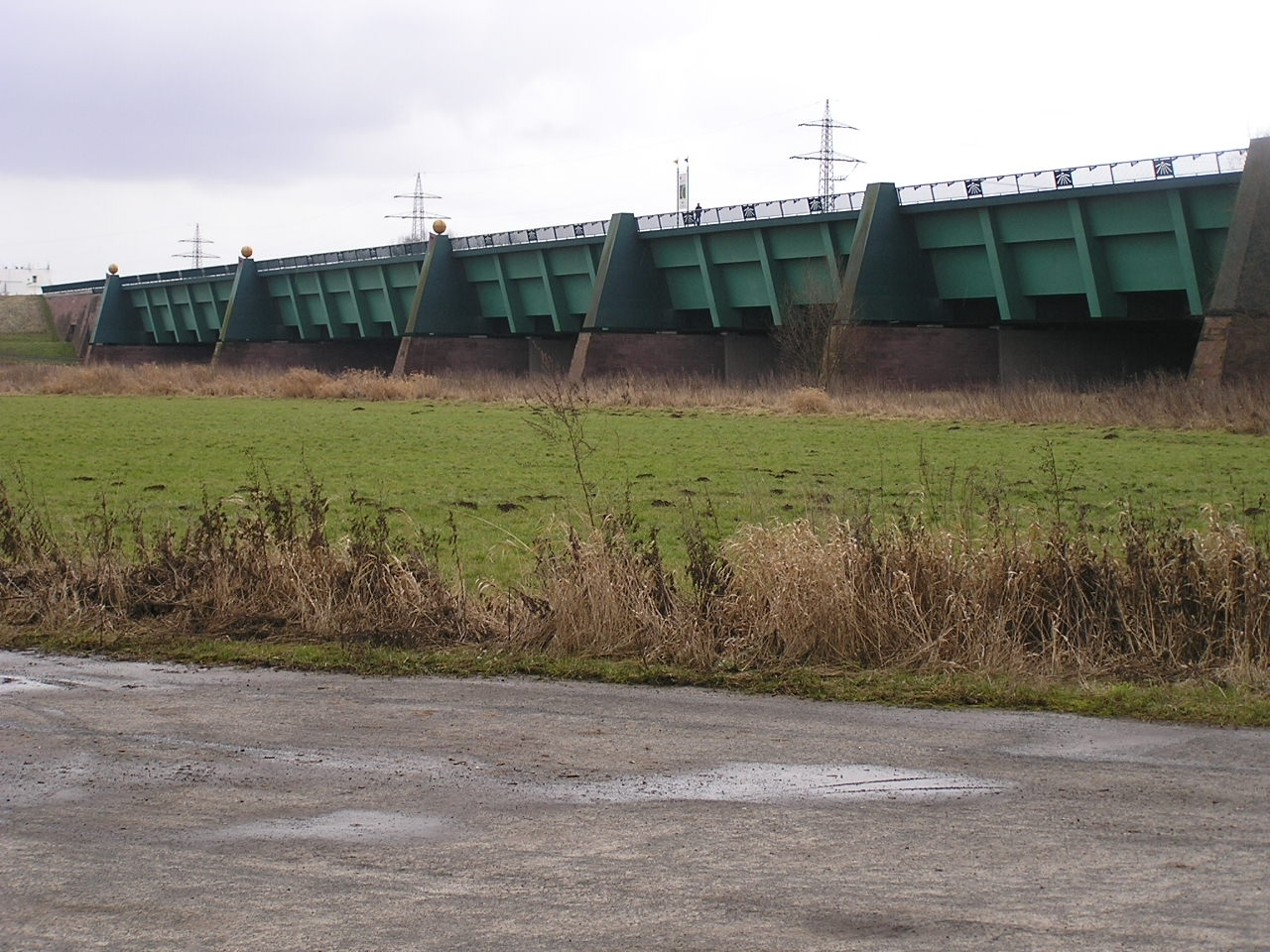
The new canal bridge as seen from the North

Over the years, ships became larger and so the canal grew too small. Thus in 1993, work began on a new bridge. This new bridge was made of steel and opened in 1998.

== Northern Link Canal ==
The Northern Link Canal of the Minden Aqueduct is west of the canal bridge and the shortest connection between Mittelland Canal and Weser. It is 1.2 km long and enables an approach to the Abstiegshafen.

=== Schacht Lock (Schachtschleuse) ===
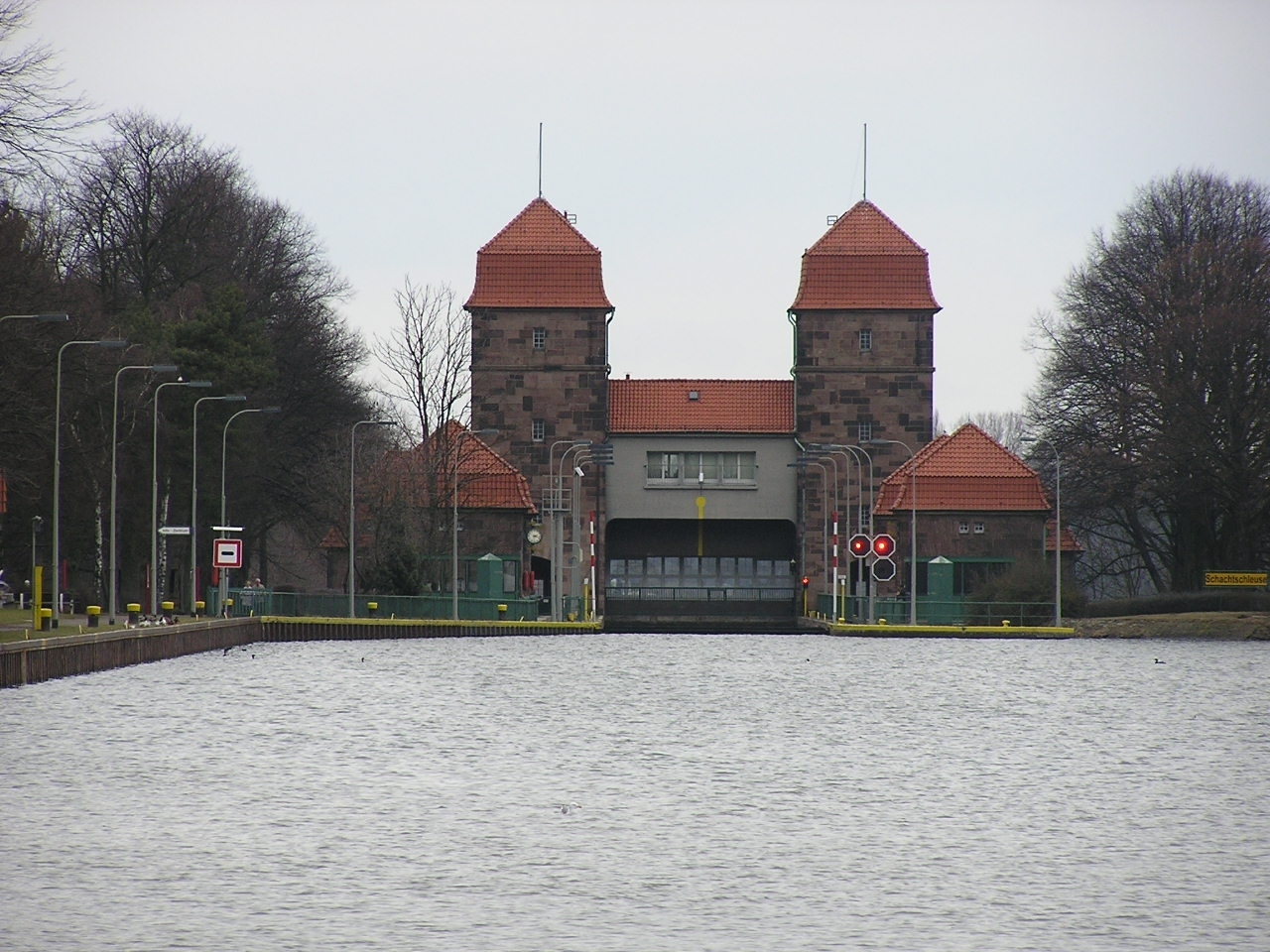
The Schacht Lock seen from the Mittelland Canal

== Southern Link Canal ==
The Southern Link Canal on the right bank of the Weser has two locks and also connects the Mittelland Canal to the River Weser. Between the two locks is the industrial port of Minden and the entrance of the old Weser port with its disused Weser shipyard.

=== Lower lock ===
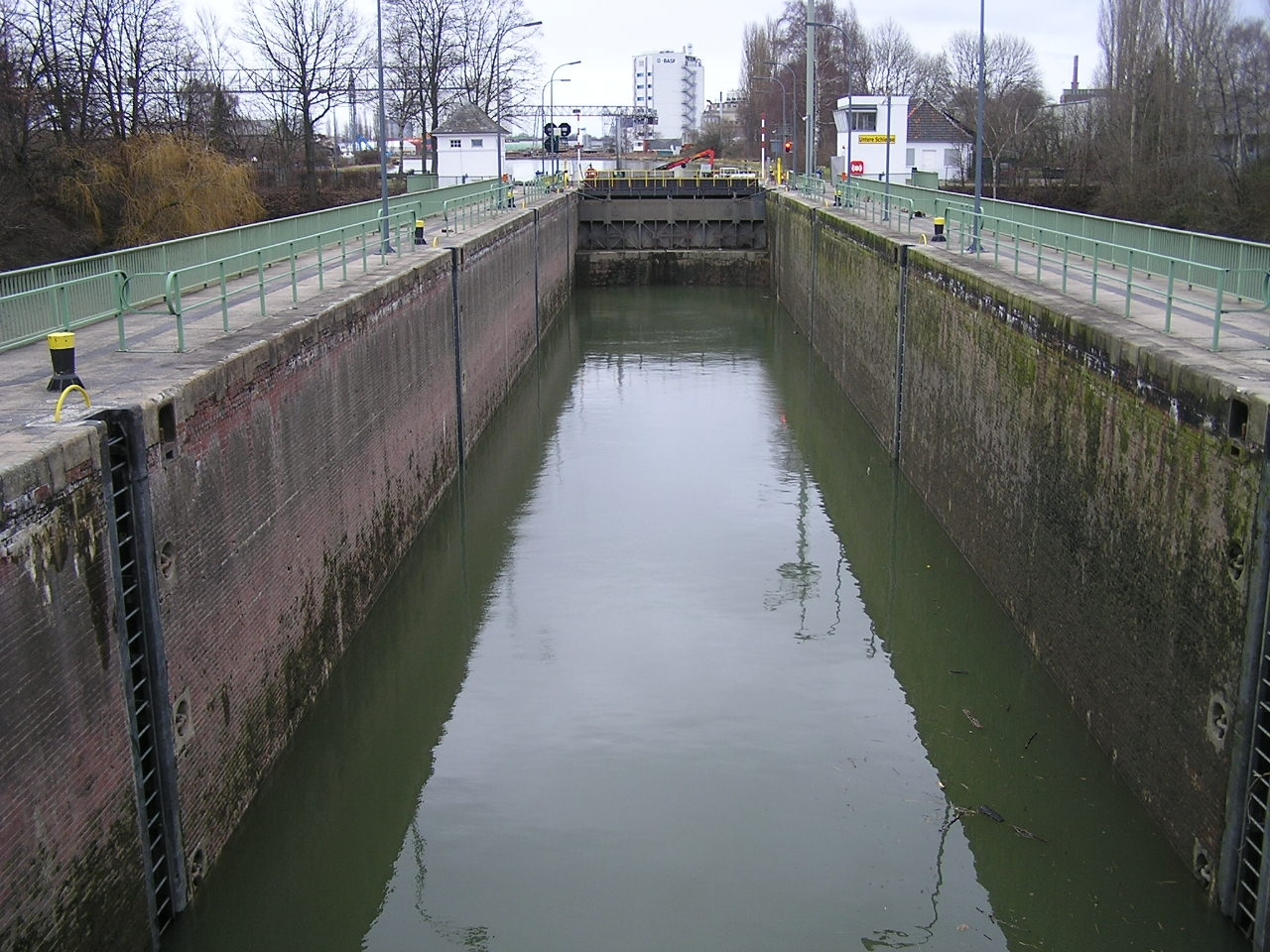
The lower lock

== Pumping stations ==
=== Main pumping station ===
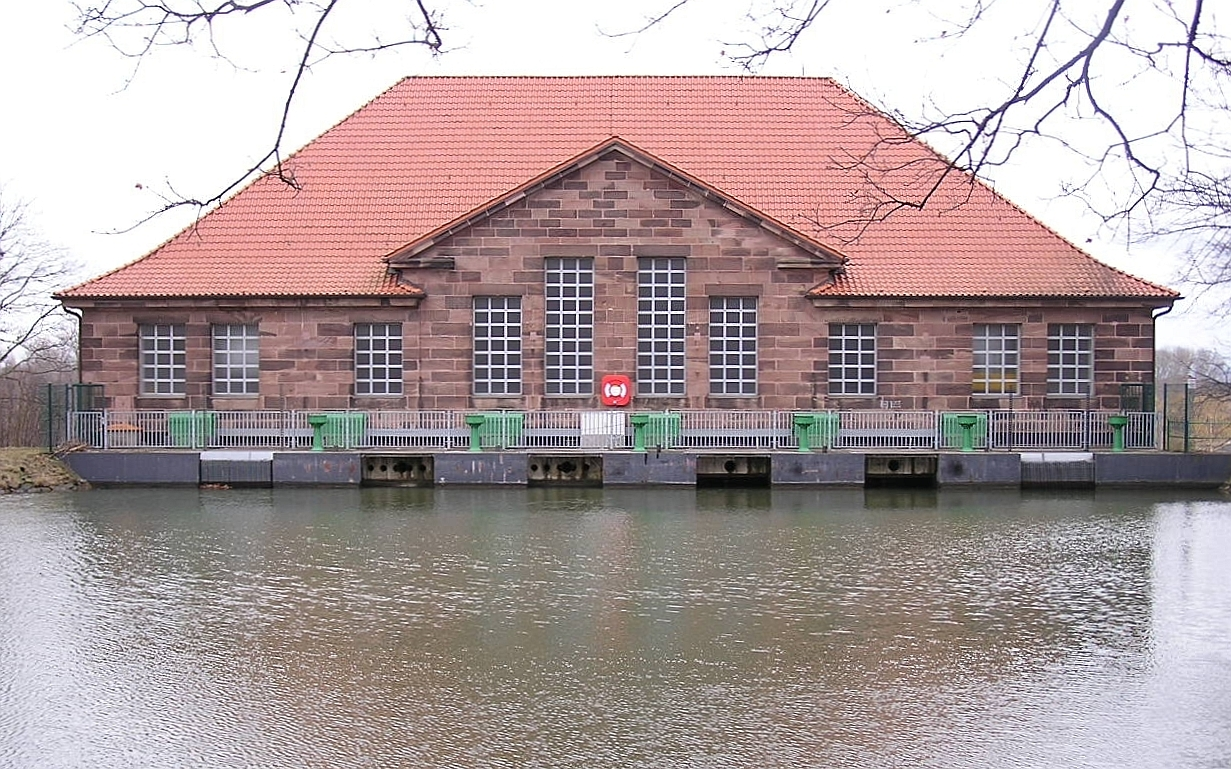
The main pump station

== Leo-Sympher-Memorial ==
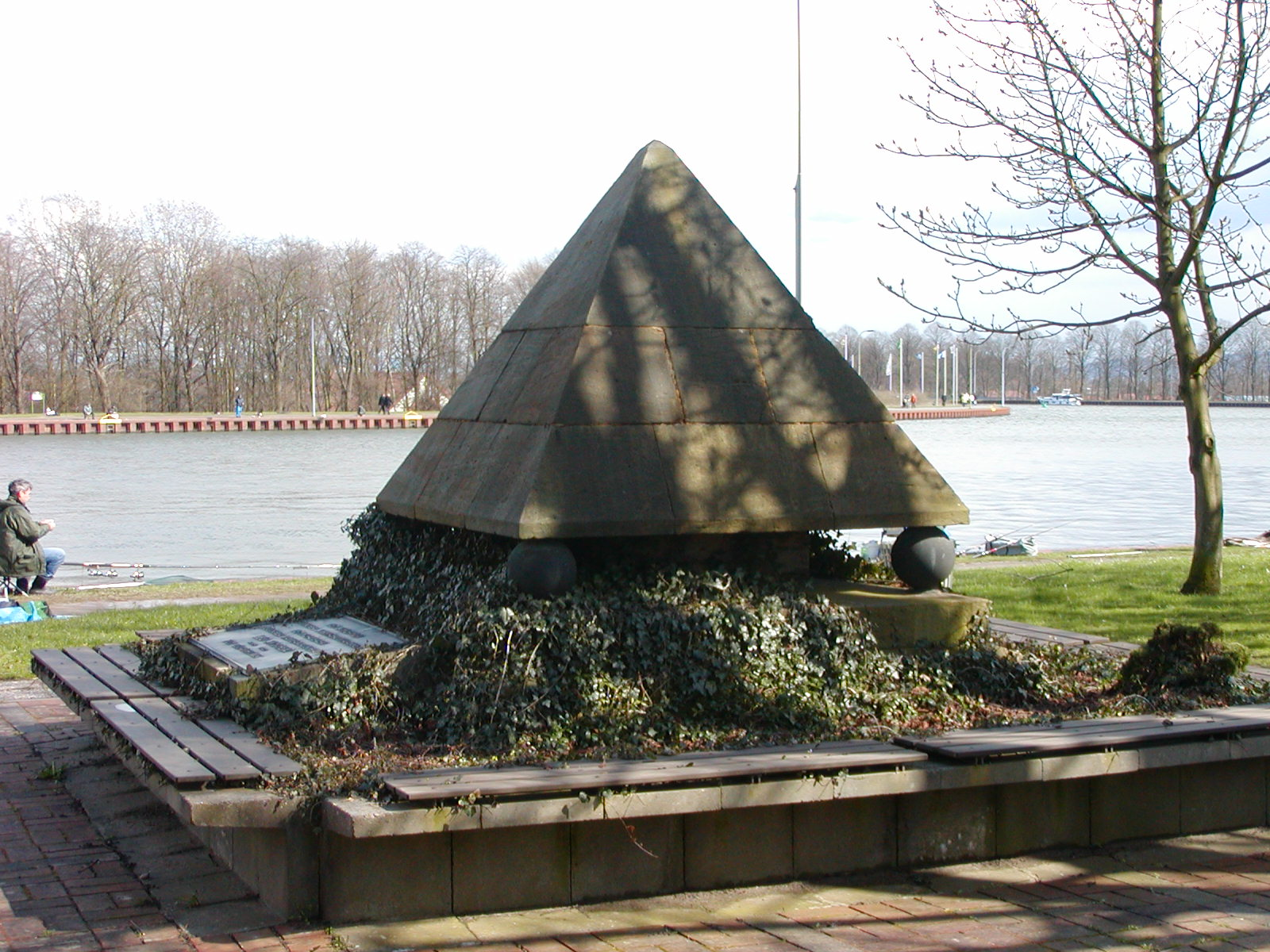
Leo Sympher memorial
