= Canal Bridge =

A canal bridge is another term for a navigable aqueduct.

The following navigable aqueducts are sometimes called by the name Canal Bridge:

- The Hood Canal Bridge in Washington
- The Ship Canal Bridge in Seattle, Washington
- The Charles River Dam Bridge in Boston, Massachusetts
- The Canal Bridge near Radcot Bridge, Oxfordshire, England
- The Elbe Canal Bridge in Magdeburg, Germany

A roving bridge is a bridge design that accommodates a canal's towpath changing banks.
