= Aqueduct =

Aqueduct may refer to:

== Structures ==
- Aqueduct (bridge), a bridge to convey water over an obstacle, such as a ravine or valley
- Navigable aqueduct, or water bridge, a structure to carry navigable waterway canals over other rivers, valleys, railways or roads
- Aqueduct (water supply), a watercourse constructed to convey water
  - Acequia, a community-operated watercourse used in Spain and former Spanish colonies in the Americas
  - Aryk, an artificial channel for redirecting water in Central Asia and other countries
  - Elan aqueduct carries water to Birmingham
  - Levada, an irrigation channel or aqueduct specific to the Portuguese island of Madeira
  - Puquios, underground water systems in Chile and Peru
- Roman aqueduct, water supply systems constructed during the Roman Empire
  - Aqueduct of Segovia, a Roman aqueduct in Segovia, Spain

== Anatomy ==
- Cerebral aqueduct in the brain
- Vestibular aqueduct in the inner ear

== Places ==
- Aqueduct, former name of Monolith, California, U.S.
- Aqueduct, New York, U.S.
- Aqueduct, Shropshire, England

== Other uses ==
- Aqueduct (band), an indie pop band
- Aqueduct (comics), a fictional character in Marvel Comics
- Aqueduct Press, an American publisher
- Aqueduct Racetrack, a horse racing track and racino, located in New York City
- "Aqueduct", a song by Squarepusher from Just a Souvenir

== See also ==
- List of aqueducts
- Aqueduct Bridge (disambiguation)
