= Veluwemeer Aqueduct =

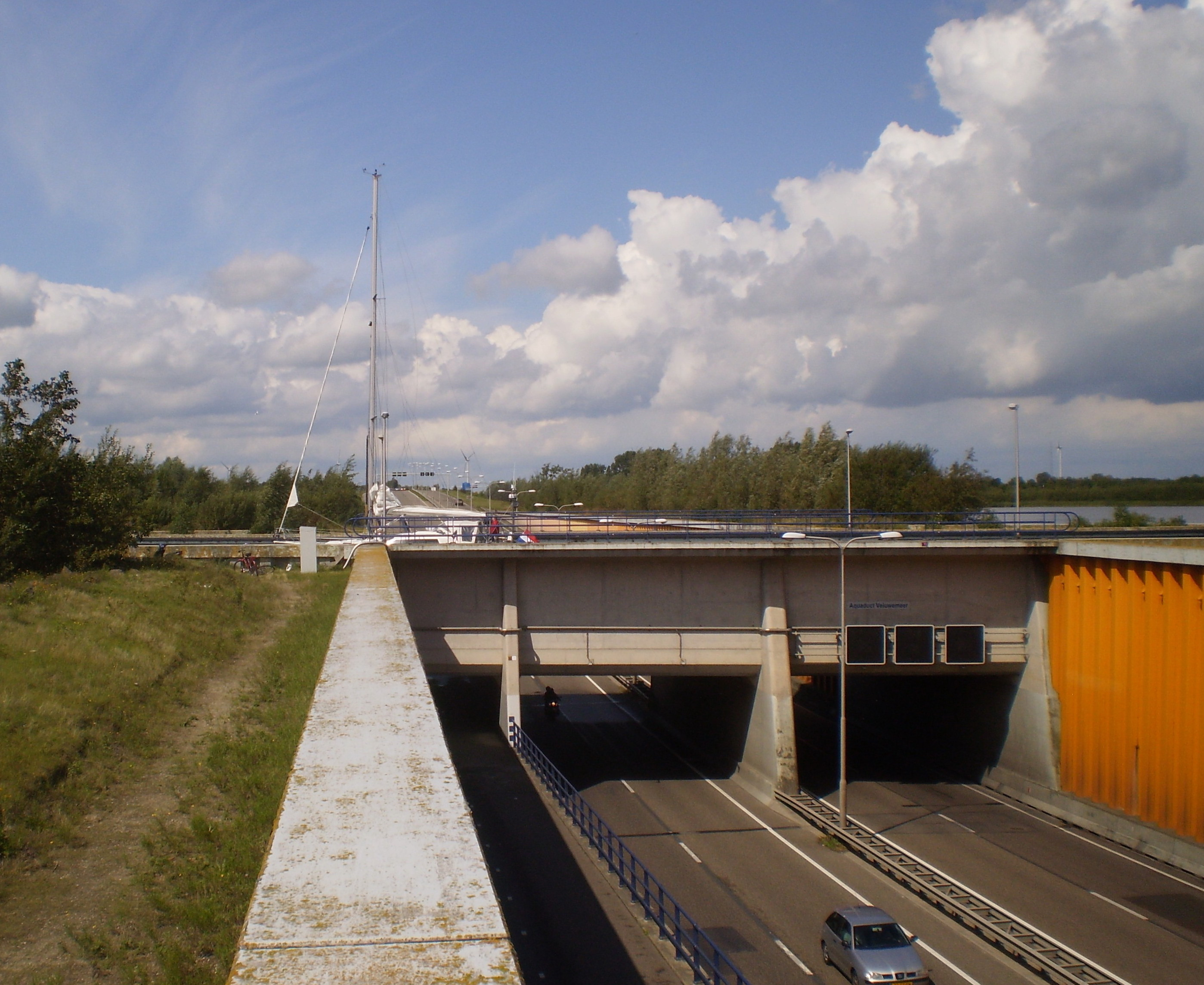
- Coordinates: 52°21′39.43″N 05°37′6.56″E
- Crosses: Provincial road N302 (Netherlands)
- Locale: Harderwijk, Netherlands

Characteristics
- Trough construction: Cut and cover
- Total length: 25 m (82 ft)
- Width: 17 m (56 ft)
- Water depth: 3 m (9.8 ft)

History
- Opened: 2002

Location
- Interactive map of Veluwemeer Aqueduct

Veluwemeer Aqueduct is a 25 m (82 ft) long, 17 m (56 ft) wide, navigable aqueduct (also known as a water bridge) located over Veluwemeer lake in Harderwijk, Netherlands. It was opened in 2002 and bypasses the N302 road.

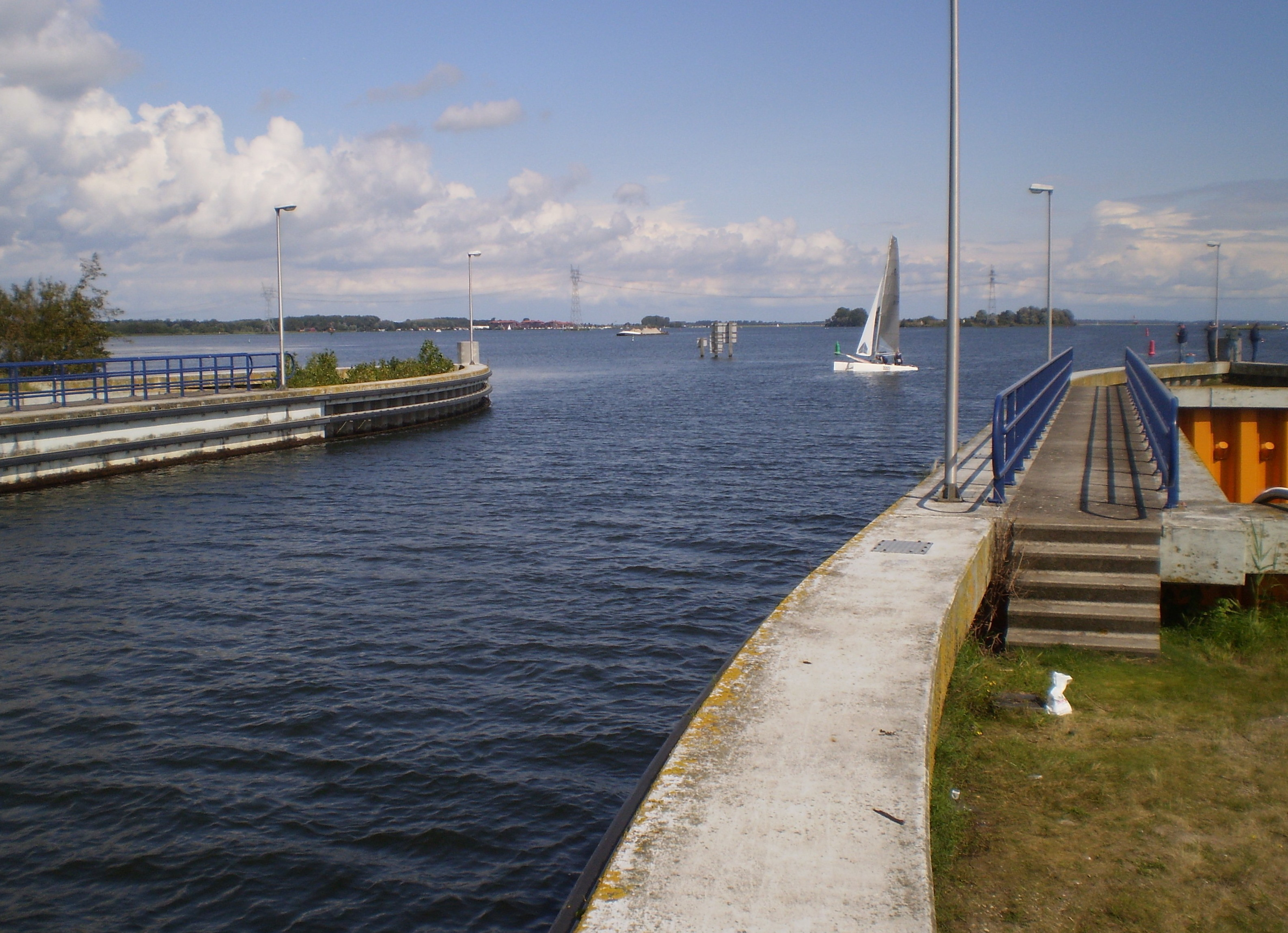
One of the footways

Where the aqueduct crosses the N302, the depth of water is 3 m (9.8 ft), which allows vessels to pass over the road safely, so long as their draft is less. There are also pedestrian crossings on both sides of the waterway.

The construction of the aqueduct took some 22,000 m^{3} (780,000 ft^{3}) of concrete, plus steel sheet piling to bear the heavy weight of the water over the road and to prevent water and sediment from leaking onto the road below.

== Bibliography ==
Jos, van der Schot; et al. (J. van Beek, N.M. Ceton-O'Prinsen, G.L. Tan) (2003). Tunnels in Nederland, een nieuwe generatie. Utrecht: Bouwdienst Rijkswaterstaat. ISBN 90-77379-01-0.
