= Mittelland Canal =

Canal in central Germany

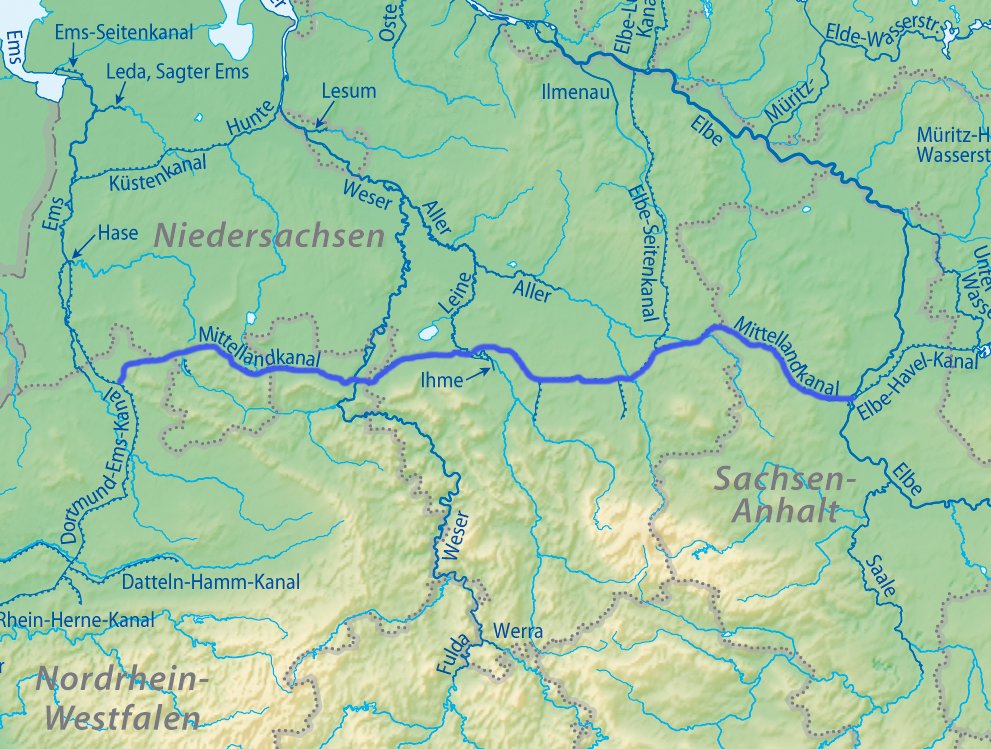
- Course of the Mittelland Canal
- Interactive map of Mittelland Canal

Specifications
- Length: 325.7 km (202 mi)

History
- Construction began: 1906
- Date completed: 1938

Geography
- Start point: Dortmund-Ems Canal at Hörstel near Rheine, Germany
- End point: Elbe River and Elbe-Havel Canal near Magdeburg, Germany
- Beginning coordinates: 52°16′37″N 7°36′18″E
- Ending coordinates: 52°14′46″N 11°44′49″E

The Mittelland Canal, also known as the Midland Canal, (German: Mittellandkanal, German: [ˈmɪtl̩lantkaˌnaːl]) is a major canal in central Germany. It forms an important link in the waterway network of the country, providing the principal east-west inland waterway connection. Its significance goes beyond Germany as it links France, Switzerland and the Benelux countries with Poland, the Czech Republic and the Baltic Sea.

At 325.7 kilometres (202.4 mi) in length, the Mittelland Canal is the longest artificial waterway in Germany.

== Route ==
The Mittelland Canal branches off the Dortmund-Ems Canal at Hörstel (near Rheine, at 52°16′37″N 7°36′18″E), runs north along the Teutoburg Forest, past Hanover and meets with the Elbe River near Magdeburg (52°14′46″N 11°44′49″E). Near Magdeburg it connects to the Elbe-Havel Canal, making a continuous shipping route to Berlin and on to Poland.

At Minden the canal crosses the river Weser over two aqueducts (completed in 1914 and 1998, respectively), and near Magdeburg it crosses the Elbe, also with an aqueduct. Connections by side canals exist at Ibbenbüren, Osnabrück, Minden (two canals connecting to the Weser), Hanover-Linden, Hanover-Misburg, Hildesheim and Salzgitter. West of Wolfsburg, the Elbe Lateral Canal branches off, providing a connection to Hamburg, and (via the Elbe-Lübeck Canal) to the Baltic Sea.

== History ==
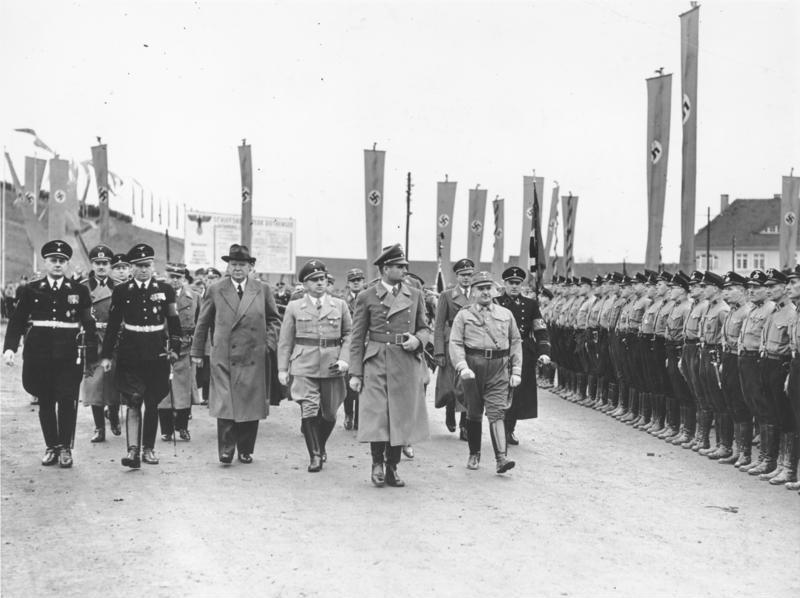
Opening in Magdeburg in 1938.

Construction of the Mittelland Canal was started in 1906, starting from Bergeshövede (municipality Hörstel) on the Dortmund-Ems Canal. The section to Minden on the Weser was opened in February 1915 and was initially named Ems-Weser-Kanal. The section from Minden to Hanover was finished in the autumn of 1916. The section to Sehnde and the branch canal to Hildesheim were completed in 1928, Peine was reached in 1929, and Braunschweig in 1933. The final section to Magdeburg was opened in 1938, thus creating a direct link between Western and Eastern Germany. The branch canal to Salzgitter was opened in 1941. The planned canal bridge over the Elbe, necessary to avoid low water conditions in summer, was not built due to the Second World War.

After partitioning of Germany following the Second World War, the Mittelland Canal was split between West Germany and East Germany, with the border to the east of Wolfsburg. To provide access from the western section of the canal to Hamburg and Northern Germany, avoiding both East Germany and the Elbe River's sometimes limited navigability, the Elbe Lateral Canal was opened in 1977.

Since the Revolutions of 1989 (fall of the Iron curtain, reunification of Germany, dissolution of the Eastern Bloc, Enlargements of the European Union), the importance of the Mittelland Canal as a link from the west to Berlin and the east has grown. The project to bridge the Elbe was therefore restarted. The Magdeburg Water Bridge opened in 2003, providing a direct link to the Elbe-Havel Canal. In 2013, the plan to connect the channel to the Twentekanaal in the Netherlands to shorten the connection towards the Port of Rotterdam was considered to be unprofitable.

Until its closure on 1 April 2024, the Mehrum Power Station received its supply of bituminous coal via the canal.

== Towns and cities ==
- Ibbenbüren
- Osnabrück (via a branch)
- Bramsche
- Lübbecke
- Minden
- Garbsen
- Hannover
- Sehnde
- Hildesheim (via a branch)
- Peine
- Salzgitter (via a branch)
- Braunschweig
- Wolfsburg
- Haldensleben
- Magdeburg

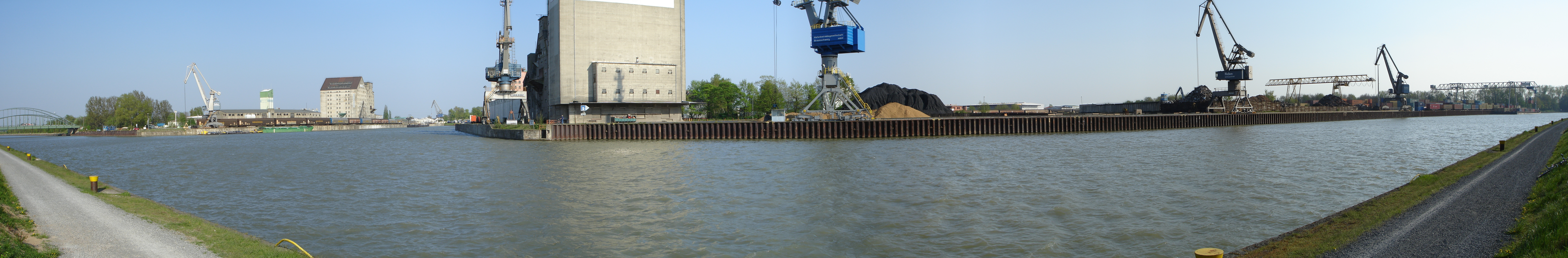
Panorama of the port of Braunschweig on the Mittelland Canal at Watenbüttel, Braunschweig

== Structures ==
- Minden Aqueduct (52°18′12″N 8°55′54″E)
- Magdeburg Water Bridge (52°13′51″N 11°42′5″E)

== Gallery ==
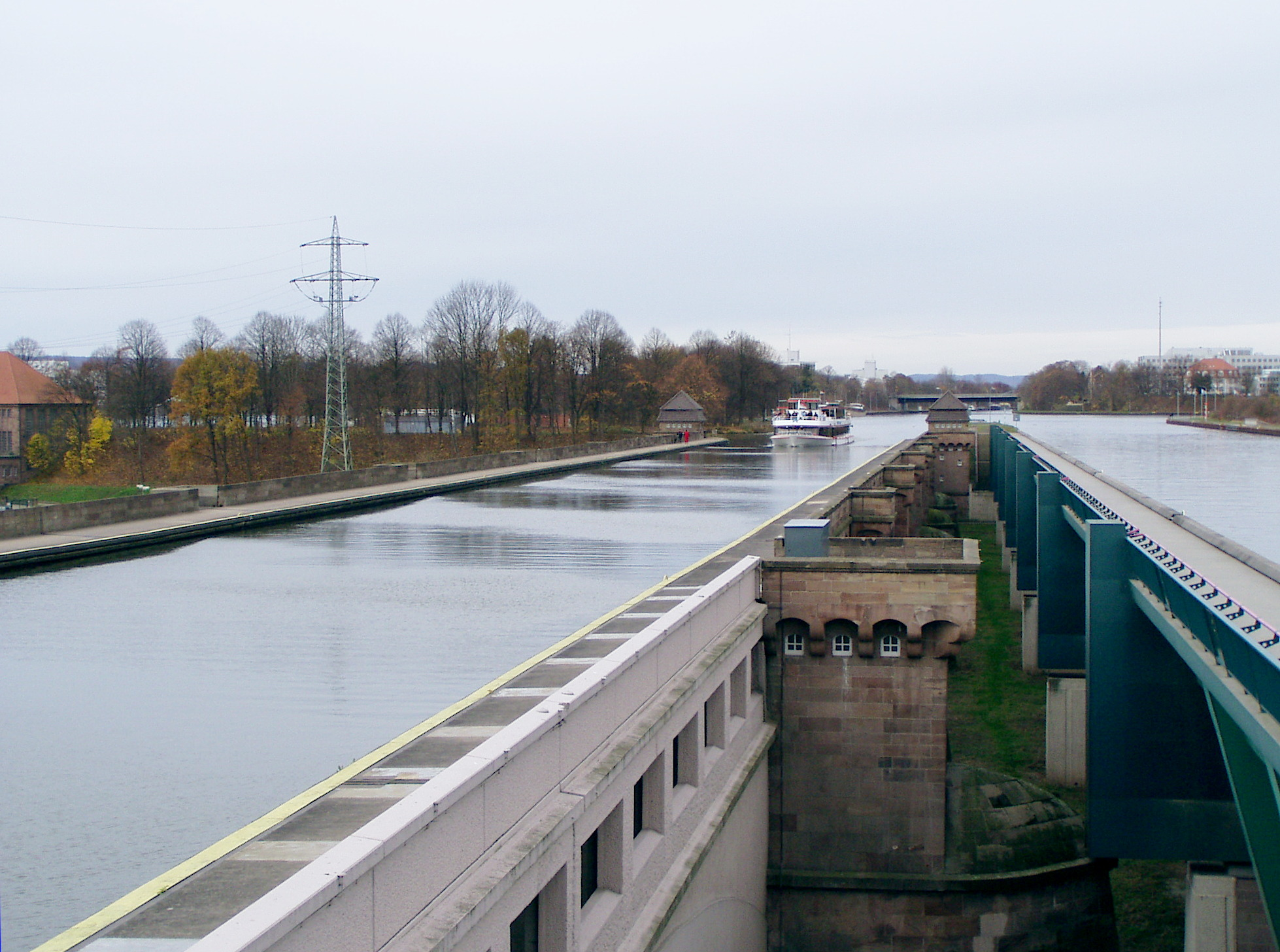
Old and new Mittelland Canal aqueducts near Minden

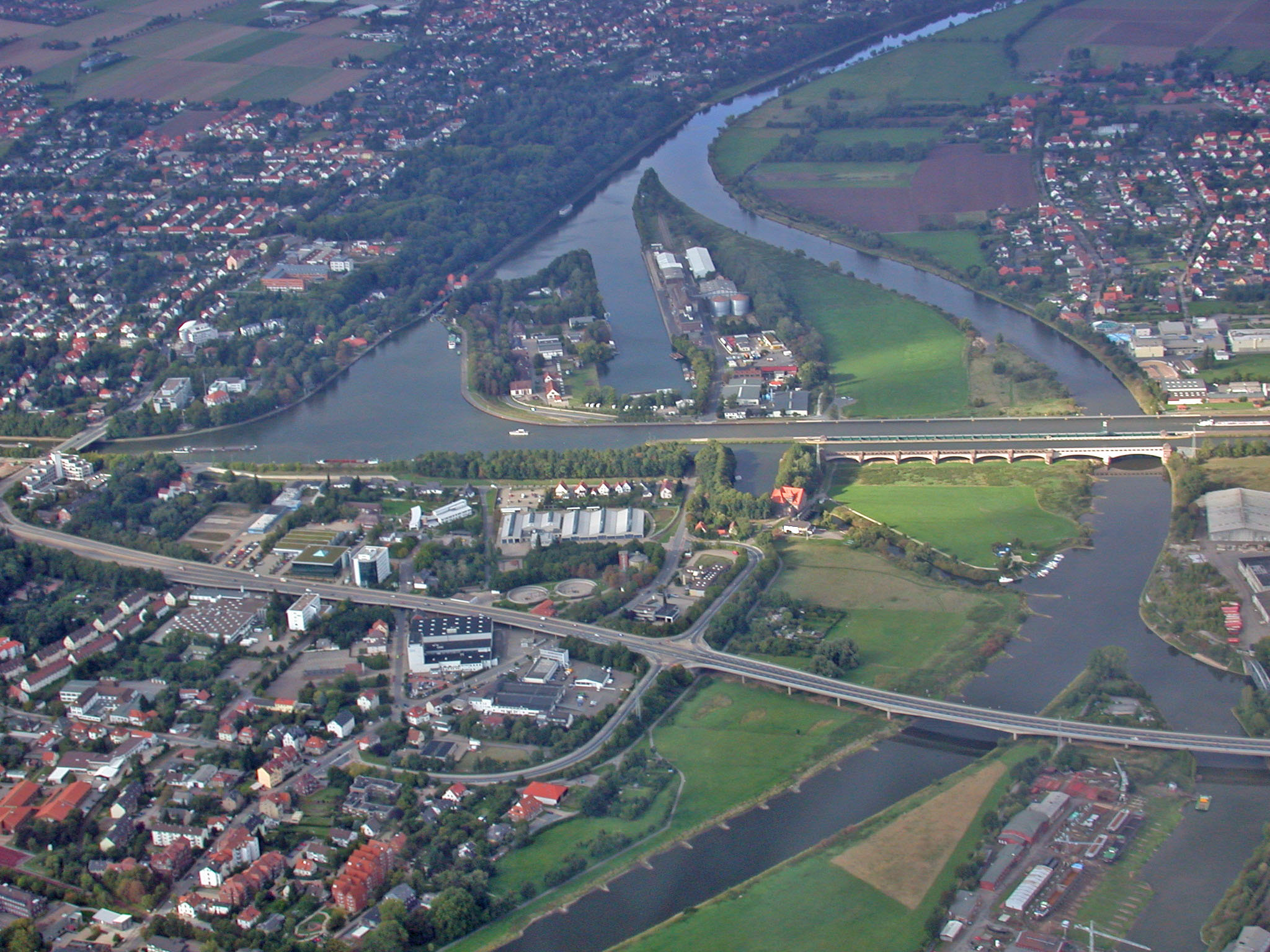
Aerial view of aqueducts and River Weser

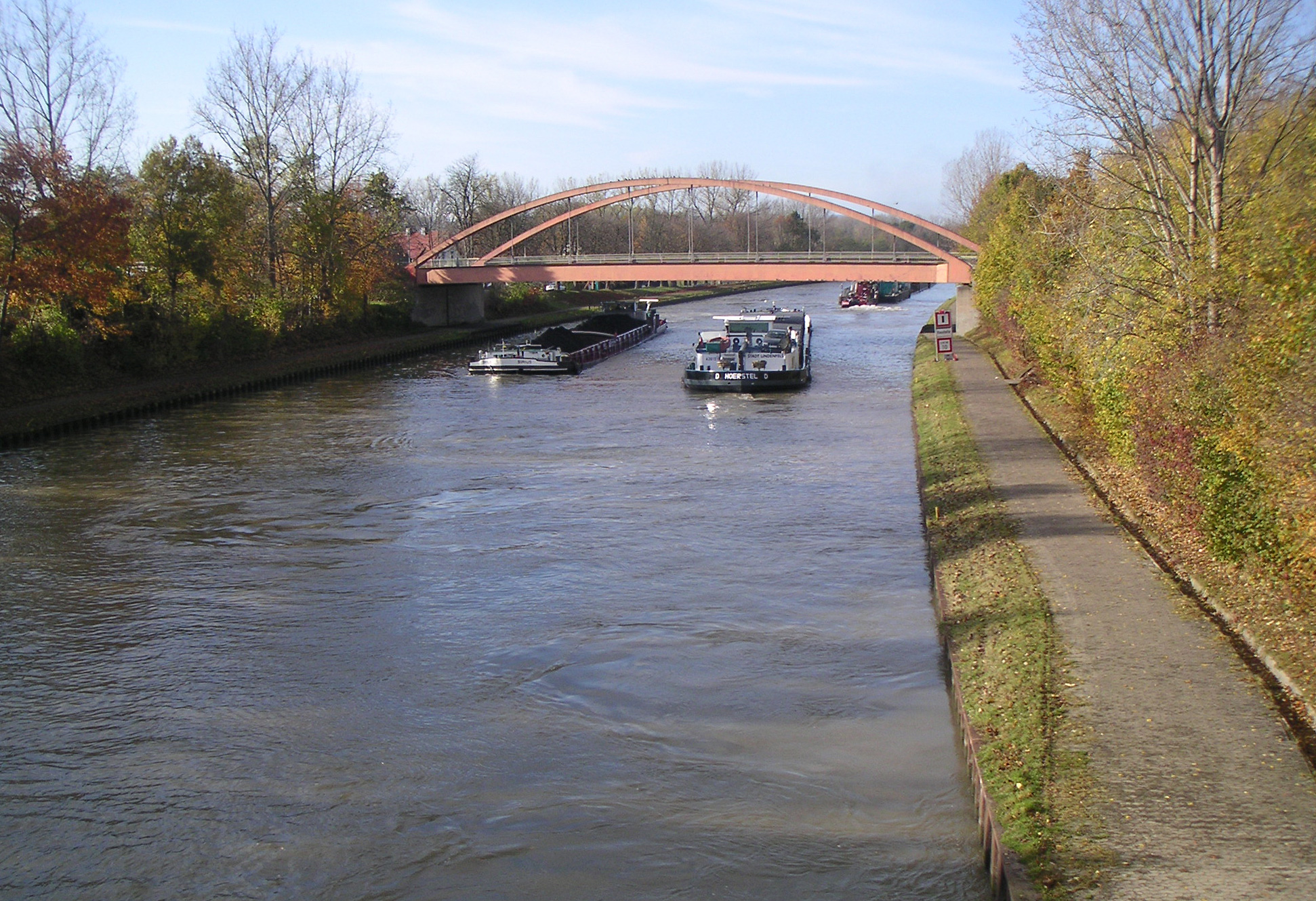
The canal near Minden

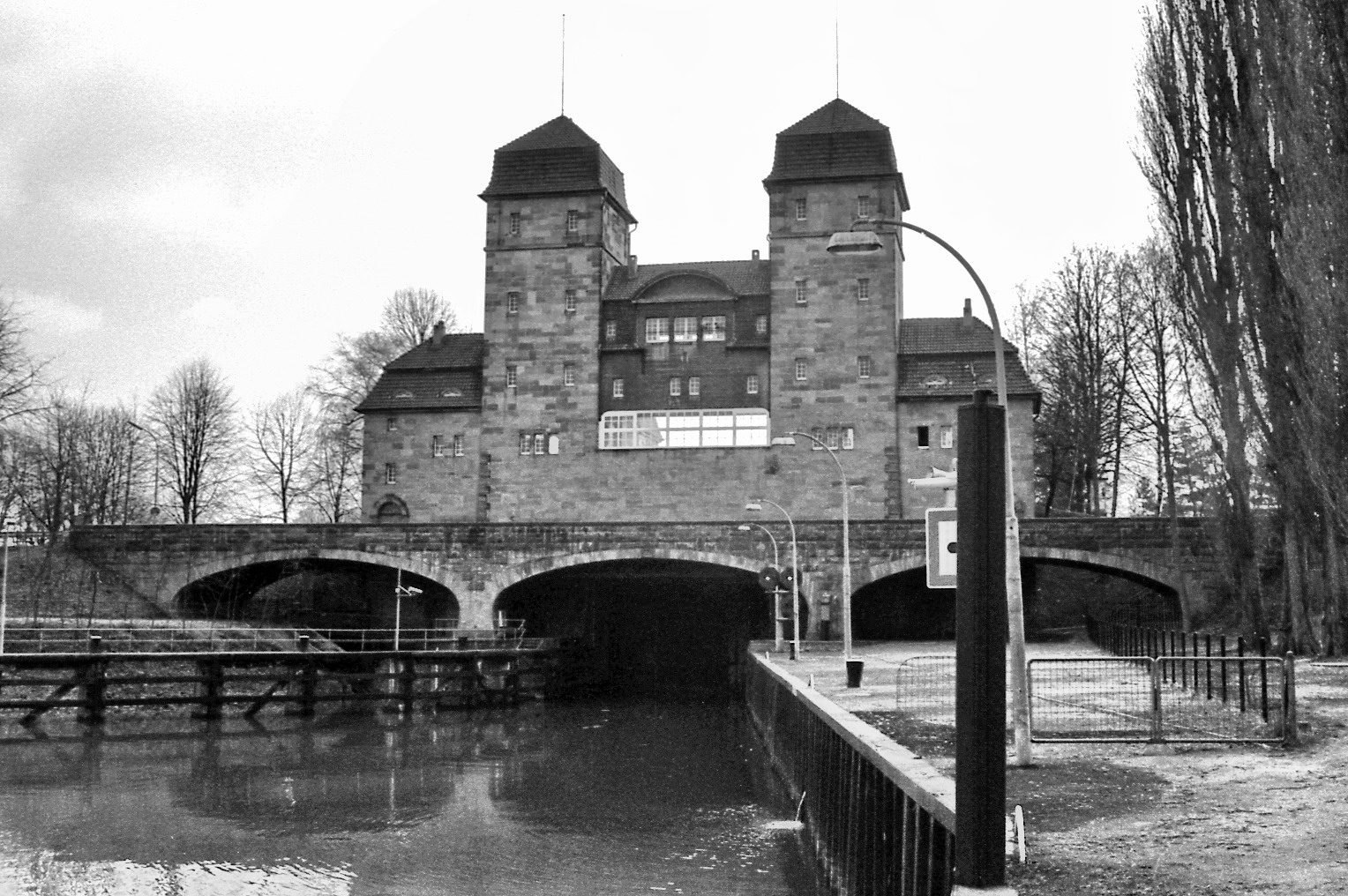
Mittelland Canal / River Weser Lock at Minden

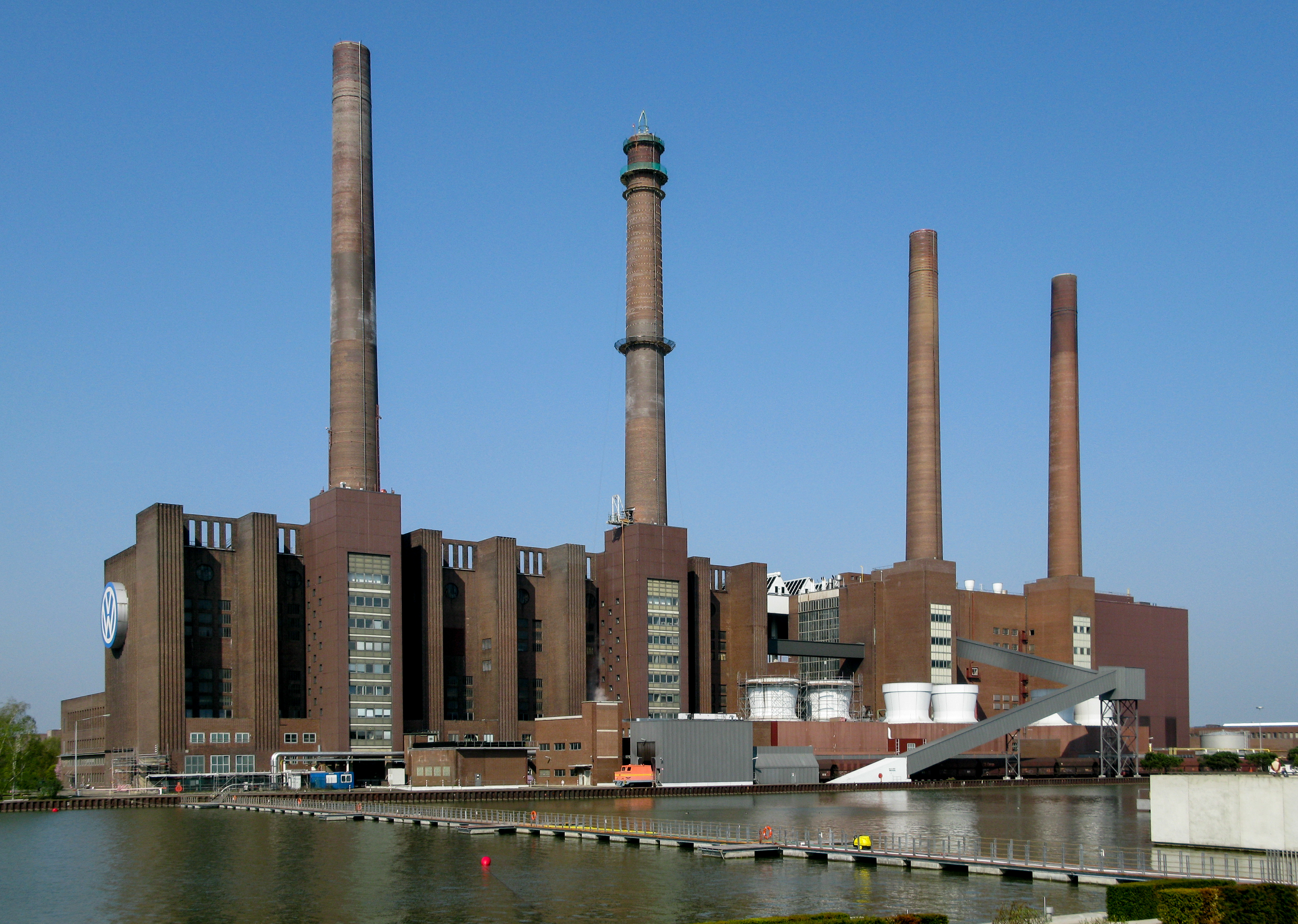
Part of the original Volkswagen plant on the canal
