= Elbe–Havel Canal =

Canal in Germany

Coordinates: 52°23′33″N 012°22′55″E

Elbe-Havel Canal
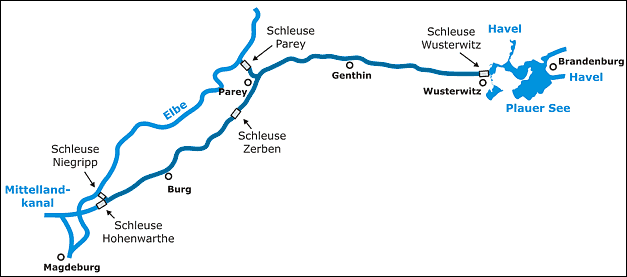
- Course of the Elbe-Havel Canal

Specifications
- Length: 56 km (35 mi)

Geography
- Start point: Elbe and Mittellandkanal near Magdeburg, Germany
- End point: Havel at Brandenburg an der Havel, Germany

The Elbe–Havel Canal is a 56-kilometre-long waterway in Germany. It links Magdeburg, on the River Elbe, with Brandenburg on the River Havel.

Since 2003, the Elbe–Havel Canal has been connected to the Mittelland Canal by the Magdeburg Water Bridge, which crosses above the River Elbe. The Mittelland Canal provides a connection to the west of Germany. To the east, the River Havel connects to the Oder-Havel Canal, and the Elbe–Havel Canal thus forms part of a continuous waterway from the west to Berlin and Poland.
