= Aqueduct Bridge =

Aqueduct Bridge may refer to:

- Aqueduct Bridge (Clay City, Indiana), U.S.
- Aqueduct Bridge (New York City), now called High Bridge, New York, U.S.
- Aqueduct Bridge (Potomac River), between Georgetown, Washington, D.C. and Rosslyn, Virginia, U.S.

== See also ==
- Aqueduct (bridge)
