= Navigable aqueduct =

Man-made channel for water and transport

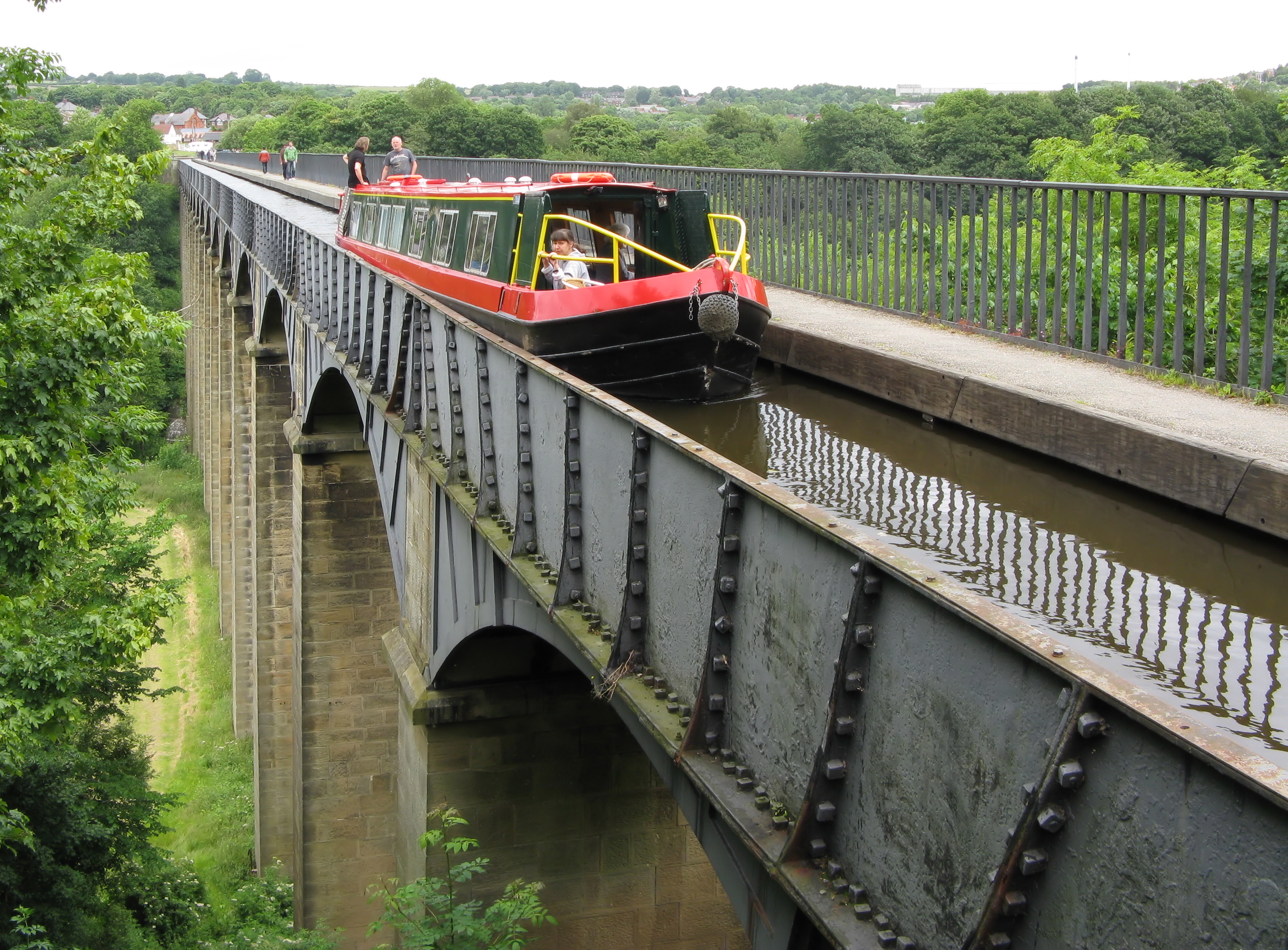
Narrowboat crossing the World Heritage Pontcysyllte Aqueduct in Wales

Navigable aqueducts (sometimes called navigable water bridges or canal bridges) are bridge structures that carry navigable waterway canals over other rivers, valleys, railways or roads. They are primarily distinguished by their size. They carry a larger cross-section of water than most water-supply aqueducts. Roman aqueducts were created in ancient Rome. They were used to transport water. The 662-metre (2,172 ft) long steel Briare aqueduct carrying the Canal latéral à la Loire over the River Loire was built in 1896. It was ranked as the longest navigable aqueduct in the world for more than a century. In the early 21st century, the Magdeburg Water Bridge in Germany was constructed, which became the new longest navigable aqueduct in the world.

Early aqueducts such as the three on the Canal du Midi had stone or brick arches. The longest span was 18.3 metres (60 ft) on the Cesse Aqueduct, built in 1690. But, the weight of the construction to support the trough with the clay or other lining to make it waterproof made these structures clumsy. In 1796 Longdon-on-Tern Aqueduct, the first large cast iron aqueduct was built by Thomas Telford at Longdon-on-Tern on the Shrewsbury Canal. It has a total length of 57 metres (187 ft) across three intermediate piers. Within ten years, Telford had completed the Pontcysyllte Aqueduct in Wales on the Llangollen Canal over the River Dee valley, with a total length of 307 metres, and a height of 38 metres. This made it the tallest navigable aqueduct in the world. Other cast-iron aqueducts followed, such as the single-span Stanley Ferry Aqueduct on the Calder and Hebble Navigation in 1839, with its 50-metre (160 ft) through arch design.

There were 32 navigable aqueducts on the Erie Canal, constructed 1817–1825 in New York State, United States.

== Notable navigable aqueducts ==
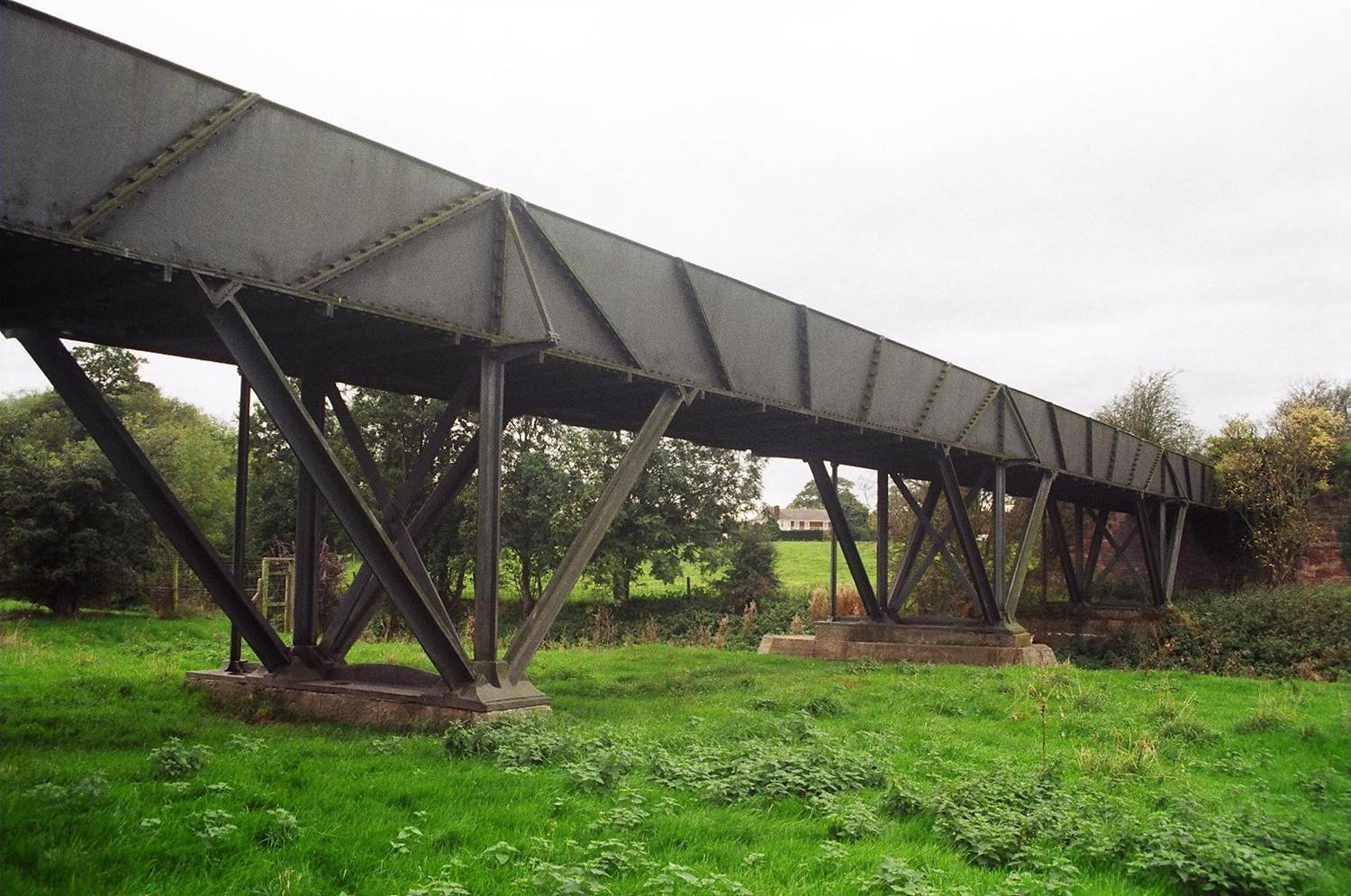
Out-of-use cast-iron Longdon-on-Tern Aqueduct

- Benjamin Outram's 44 ft long (13 m) single-span Holmes Aqueduct on the Derby Canal in Derby was the world's first navigable cast iron aqueduct, narrowly pre-dating Thomas Telford's 186 ft long (57 m) Longdon-on-Tern Aqueduct on the Shrewsbury Canal, sometimes described as the world's first large-scale navigable cast iron aqueduct. The oldest currently navigable cast-iron aqueduct is Outram's Stakes Aqueduct on the Huddersfield Narrow Canal at Stalybridge, built c1801 to replace an original, stone-built, four arch structure, which had been swept away in the floods of August 1799.
- Pontcysyllte Aqueduct (307 metres, 1,007 ft) carries the Llangollen Canal over the River Dee valley in north Wales; it was designed by Thomas Telford, opened in 1805 and is the highest navigable aqueduct in the world. The same canal, which includes a tunnelled section, crosses a second valley on the Chirk Aqueduct (1796–1801). This navigable canal also supplies water to the former borough of Crewe and Nantwich.
- The Union Canal in Scotland has many aqueducts, including the Slateford Aqueduct that takes the canal over the Water of Leith, the Almond Aqueduct over the River Almond at Ratho, and the very impressive Avon Aqueduct over the River Avon. The Avon is the second-longest aqueduct in the United Kingdom (810 feet, 250 m).
- The Agen aqueduct (1849) in France is 539 metres (1,768 ft) long and carries the canal de Garonne across the Garonne River.
- Sir Arthur Cotton planned the aqueduct at P. Gannavaram, Andhra Pradesh in India to cater for the needs of farmers in the Konaseema area while he was constructing the Dowleswaram barrage. Originally a non-navigable aqueduct was constructed in 1859 with a length of 700 metres (2,300 ft). In 2000, a new navigable aqueduct and road bridge was constructed across the River Vynateya (a tributary of the Godavari River) near Gannavaram, to facilitate the crossing of the Gannavaram Canal and also to irrigate a farming land.
- The Briare aqueduct (1896) near Châtillon-sur-Loire, France, carries the Canal latéral à la Loire in a steel channel over the Loire River. At 662 metres (2,172 ft), it was the longest canal aqueduct in the world for a century.
- Following construction of the M6 Toll Motorway the building of the Lichfield Canal Aqueduct ran into construction difficulties. The UK parliament passed legislation preventing a road being built in the path of a canal being renovated without providing a tunnel or aqueduct for canal traffic to pass.

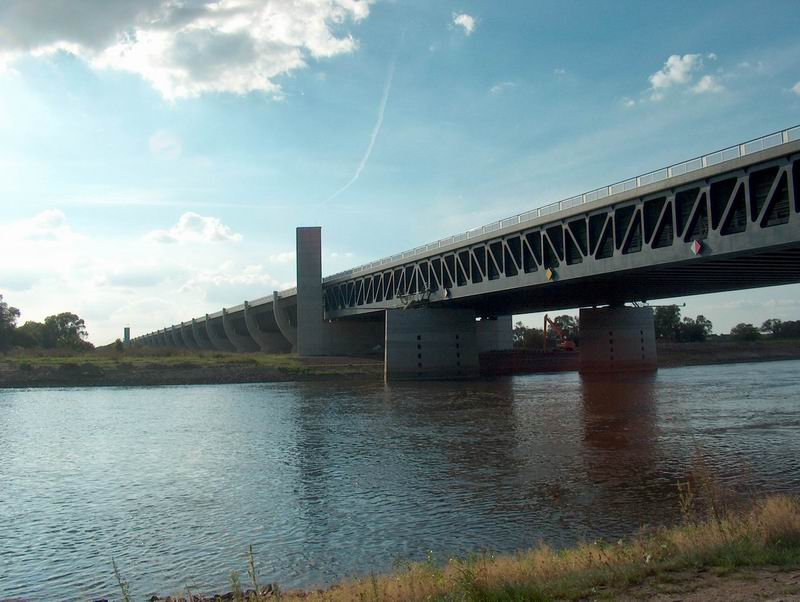
The Magdeburg Water Bridge seen from the shores of the Elbe

- Barton Swing Aqueduct is a swing bridge that carries the Bridgewater Canal across the lower Manchester Ship Canal. A 234 ft (71 m) section of the aqueduct rotates through 90 degrees to allow vessels to pass along the Ship Canal.
- Veluwemeer Aqueduct is a 25-meter long navigable aqueduct located over Veluwemeer lake in Harderwijk, Netherlands. It was opened in 2002 and bypasses the N302 road.
- An aqueduct near Roelofarendsveen, Netherlands (1961) (52°12′55.96″N 4°37′35.46″E) carries the Ringvaart canal over the A4 highway and the HSL-Zuid, which are situated on land below the level of the canal (and below sea level).
- Gouwe aqueduct, near Gouda in the Netherlands, carries the Gouwe river over the A12 highway, which is on land below the level of the river.
- The Krabbersgat naviduct, Houtribdijk near Enkhuizen, The Netherlands, is the only aqueduct in the world that also operates as a lock.
- The Magdeburg Water Bridge in Germany (2003) connects the important Mittellandkanal over the river Elbe to the Elbe-Havel canal. Nearly 1 km (0.6 mi) long, it is the longest navigable aqueduct in the world.

== Gallery ==
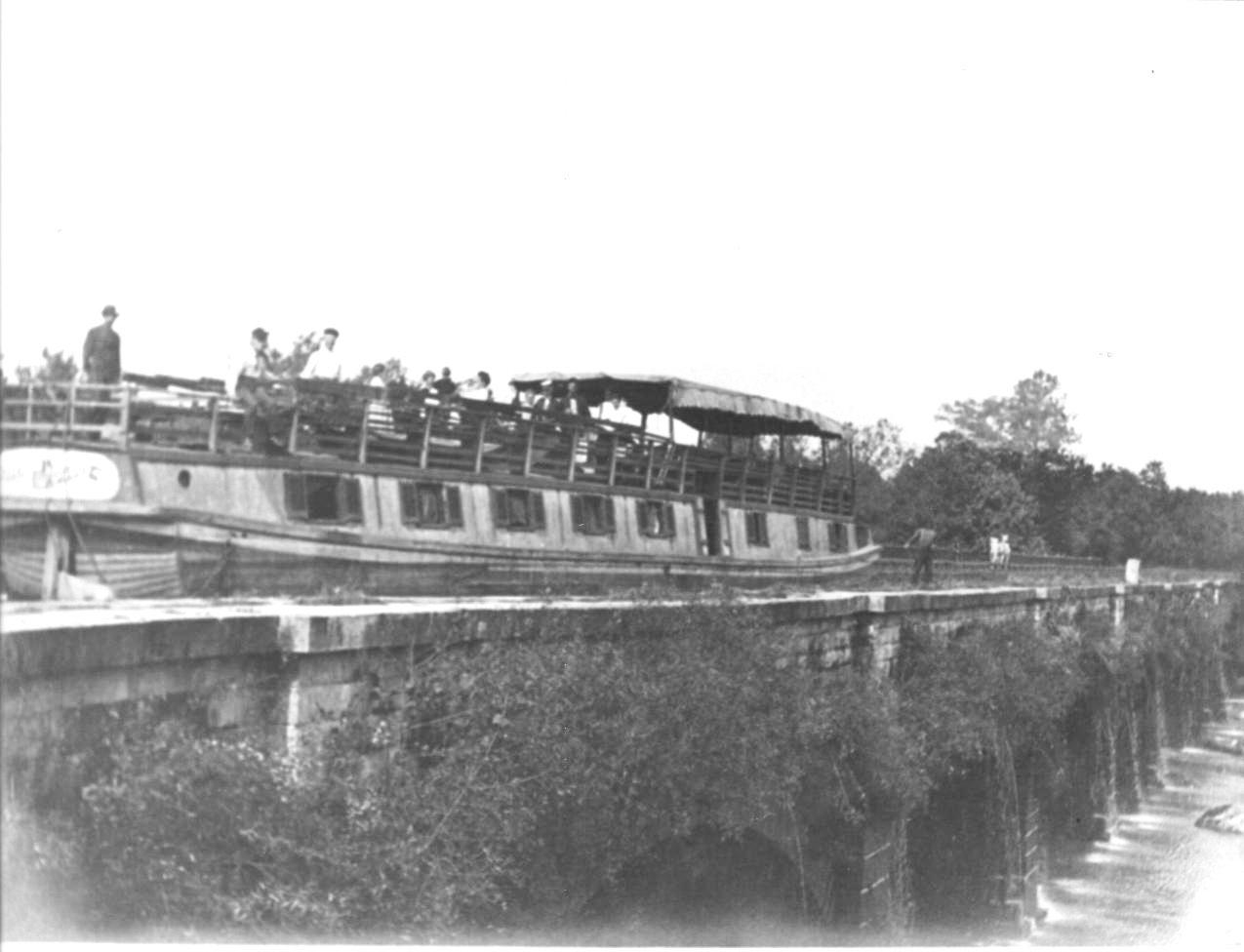
Passenger (packet) boat on the Monocacy Aqueduct of the Chesapeake and Ohio Canal

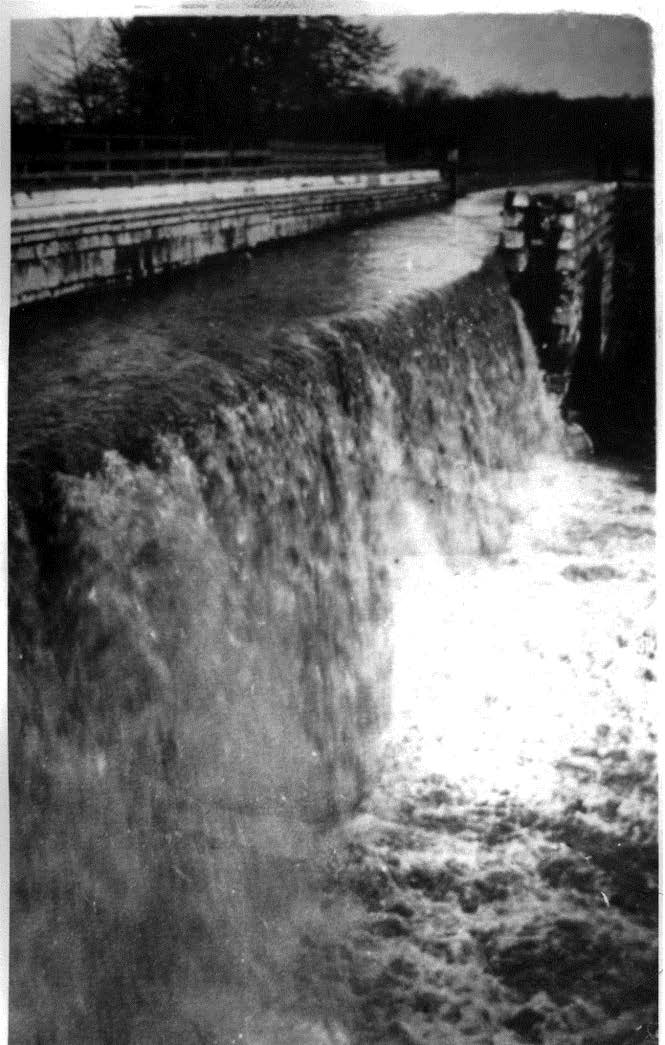
The wall of the Conococheague Creek aqueduct collapsed when a boat hit it, shutting down navigation until repaired.

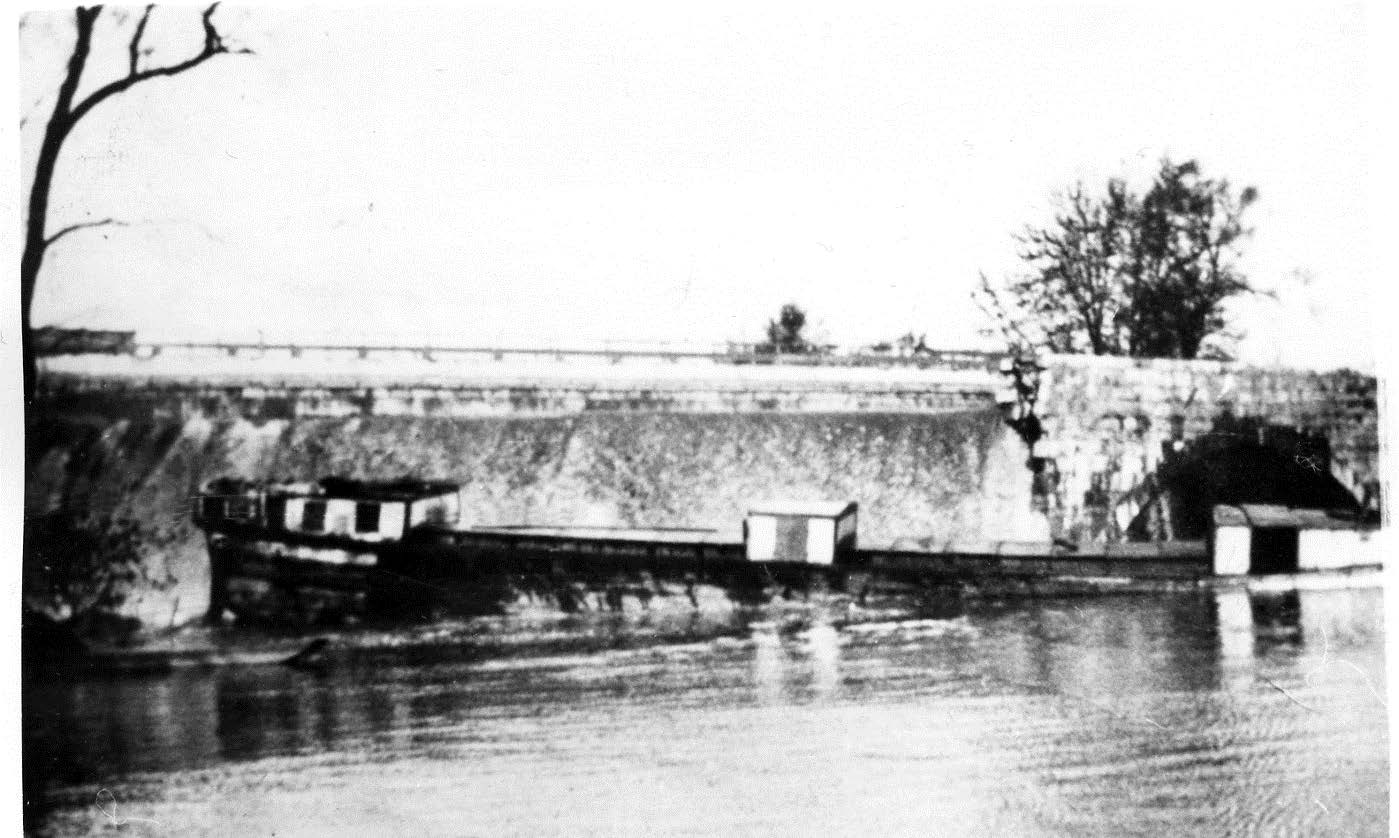
The captain jumped off the boat before the wall went out, dumping the boat into the creek below. There were no casualties in this accident.

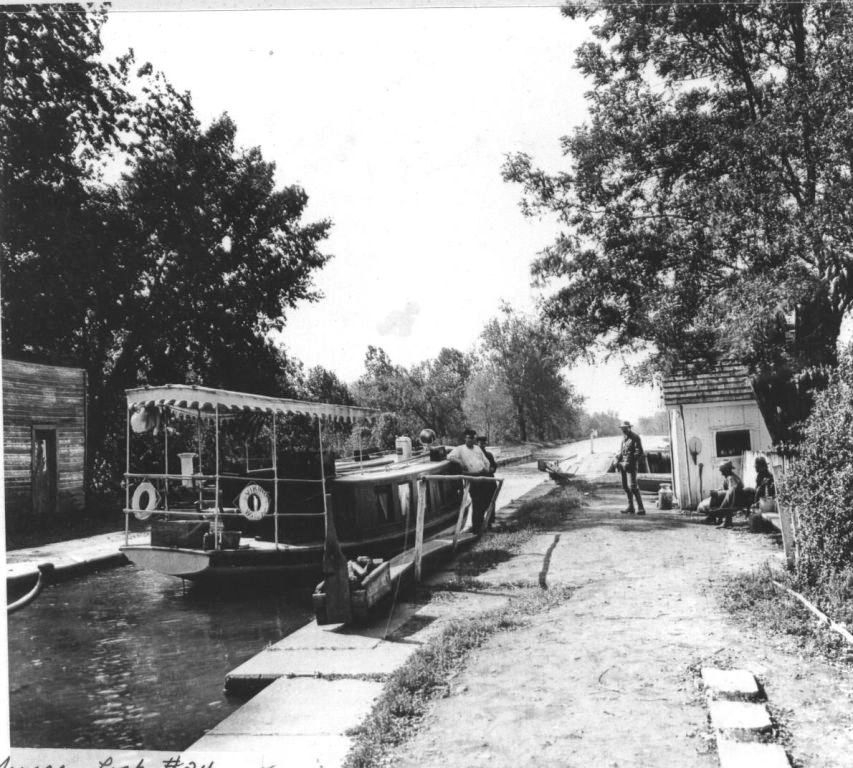
The Seneca Aqueduct was a lift lock as well as an aqueduct.

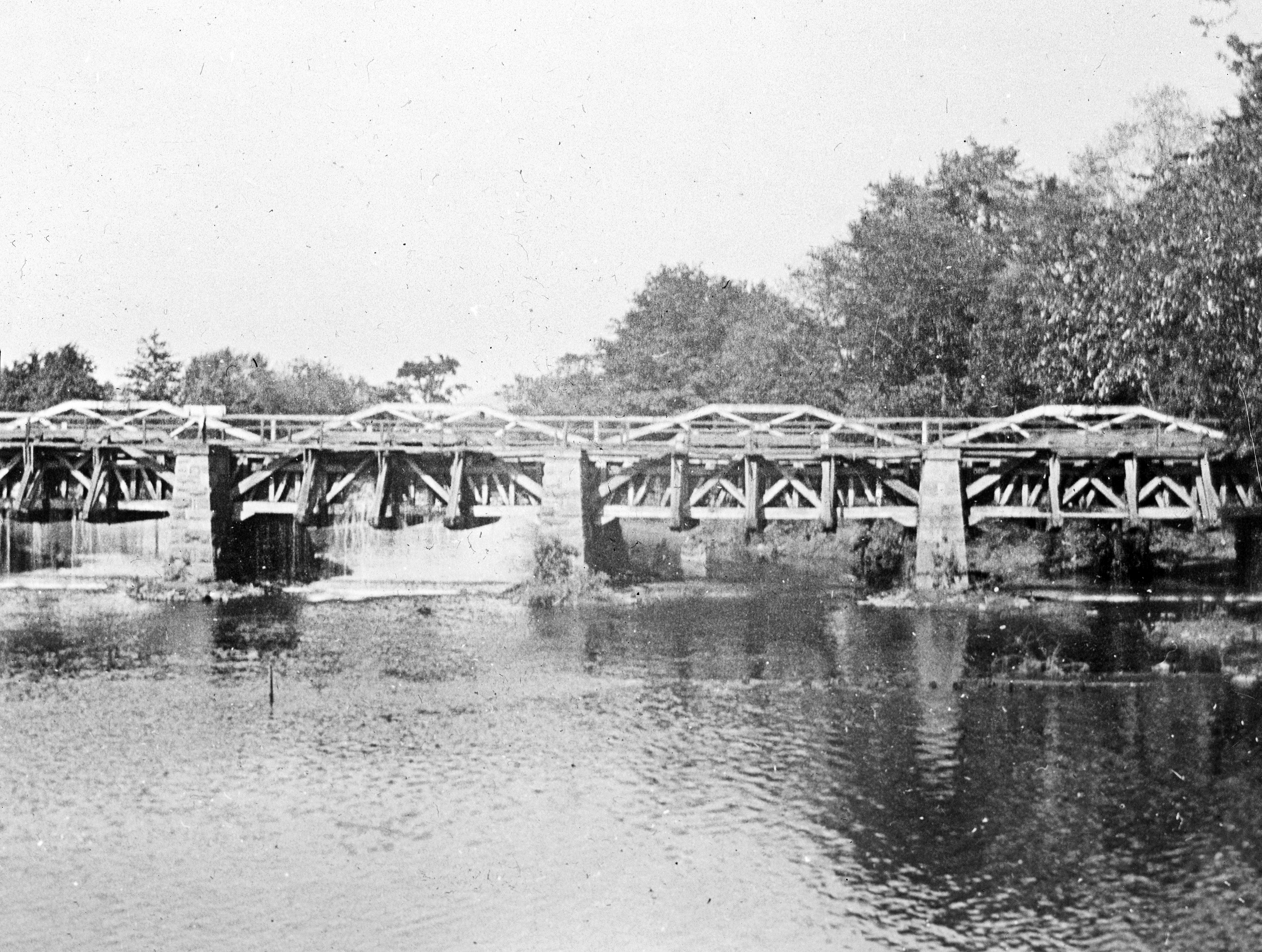
This wooden aqueduct carried the Morris Canal over the Pompton River.

== See also ==
- Aqueduct (disambiguation)
- List of canal aqueducts in Great Britain
- Viaduct
