= Magdeburg Water Bridge =

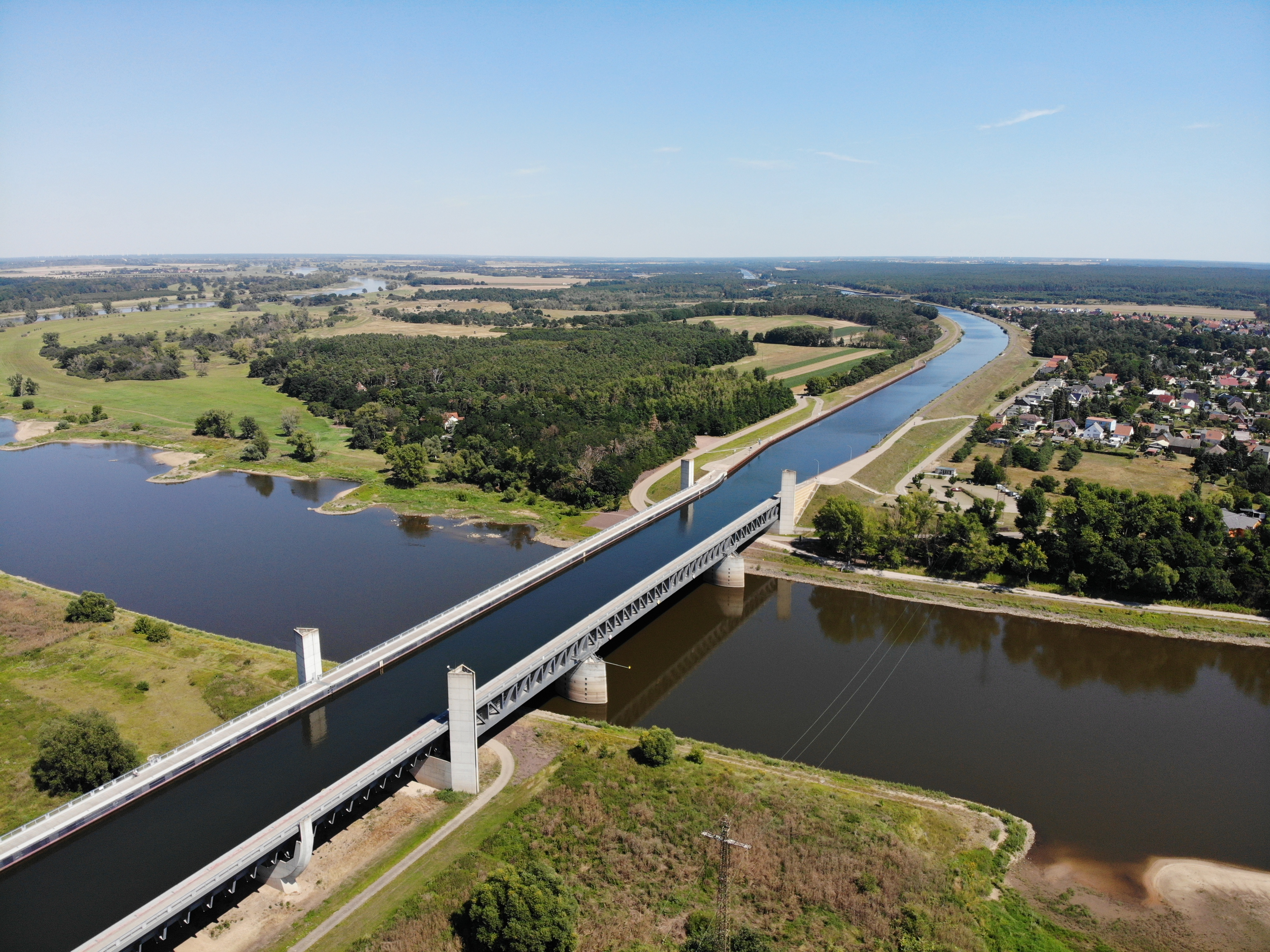
- The eastern part of the bridge
- Coordinates: 52.230833°N 11.701389°E

Characteristics
- Design: Beam Bridge
- Total length: 918 metres (3,012 ft) (690 m over land and 228 m over water)
- Width: 34 metres (112 ft)
- Height: 6.25 metres (20.5 ft)
- Water depth: 4.25 metres (13.9 ft)
- Traversable?: boats, pedestrians, cyclists
- Longest span: 106 metres (348 ft)
- Clearance below: 90.00 m × 6.25 m

History
- Construction start: 1997
- Construction end: 2003
- Opened: 2003

Location
- Interactive map of Magdeburg Water Bridge

The Magdeburg Water Bridge (German: Kanalbrücke Magdeburg) is a large navigable aqueduct in central Germany, located near Magdeburg. The largest canal underbridge in Europe, it spans the river Elbe and directly connects the Mittellandkanal on the west side and Elbe-Havel Canal on the east side of the river, allowing large commercial ships to pass between the Rhineland and Berlin without having to descend into and then climb out of the Elbe itself.

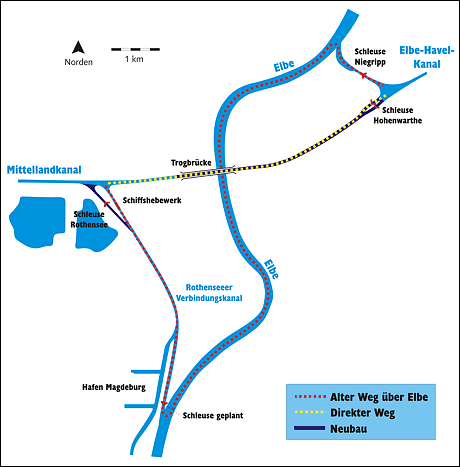
Map of the bridge, showing new (yellow) and previous (red) vessel routings

== History ==
Planning for the canal crossing dates back to at least the beginning of the 20th century. Work on the Mittellandkanal began in 1905, while work on the overall project continued until 1942, when all construction was brought to a halt because of World War II. After the war, the government of East Germany did not resume work on the project because east-west trade was no longer important in the context of the Cold War. After the reunification of Germany, the reestablishment of major water transport routes made the water bridge a priority again. Work started in 1998, with construction taking six years and costing €501 million. The water bridge now connects Berlin’s inland harbour network with the ports along the Rhine River. The aqueduct's structure incorporates 24,000 tons of steel and 68,000 cubic meters of concrete.

== Pop culture ==
The bridge is featured in the motion picture Hanna, at approximately 75 minutes into the film. It also appears in the film Vitou the Kong.

== Locks ==
In addition to the bridge, a double lock was constructed to allow vessels to descend from the level of the bridge and Mittelland Canal to that of the Elbe-Havel Canal.

== See also ==
- List of bridges in Germany

== Bibliography ==
- Karl Jüngel, Das Wasserstraßenkreuz bei Magdeburg, Undated, ca. 2003
