= Plaue, Brandenburg =

Plaue
- District
- Plaue
- Coordinates: 52°24′N 12°25′E
- Country: Germany
- State: Brandenburg
- City: Brandenburg an der Havel
- First mentioned: 1197 (as Henrycus de Plawe)

Population (31 December 2015)
  - Total: 2,593
- Time zone: UTC+1 (CET)
  - Summer (DST): UTC+2 (CEST)
- Postal code: 14776
- Dialling code: +49 3381
- ISO 3166 code: DE-BB

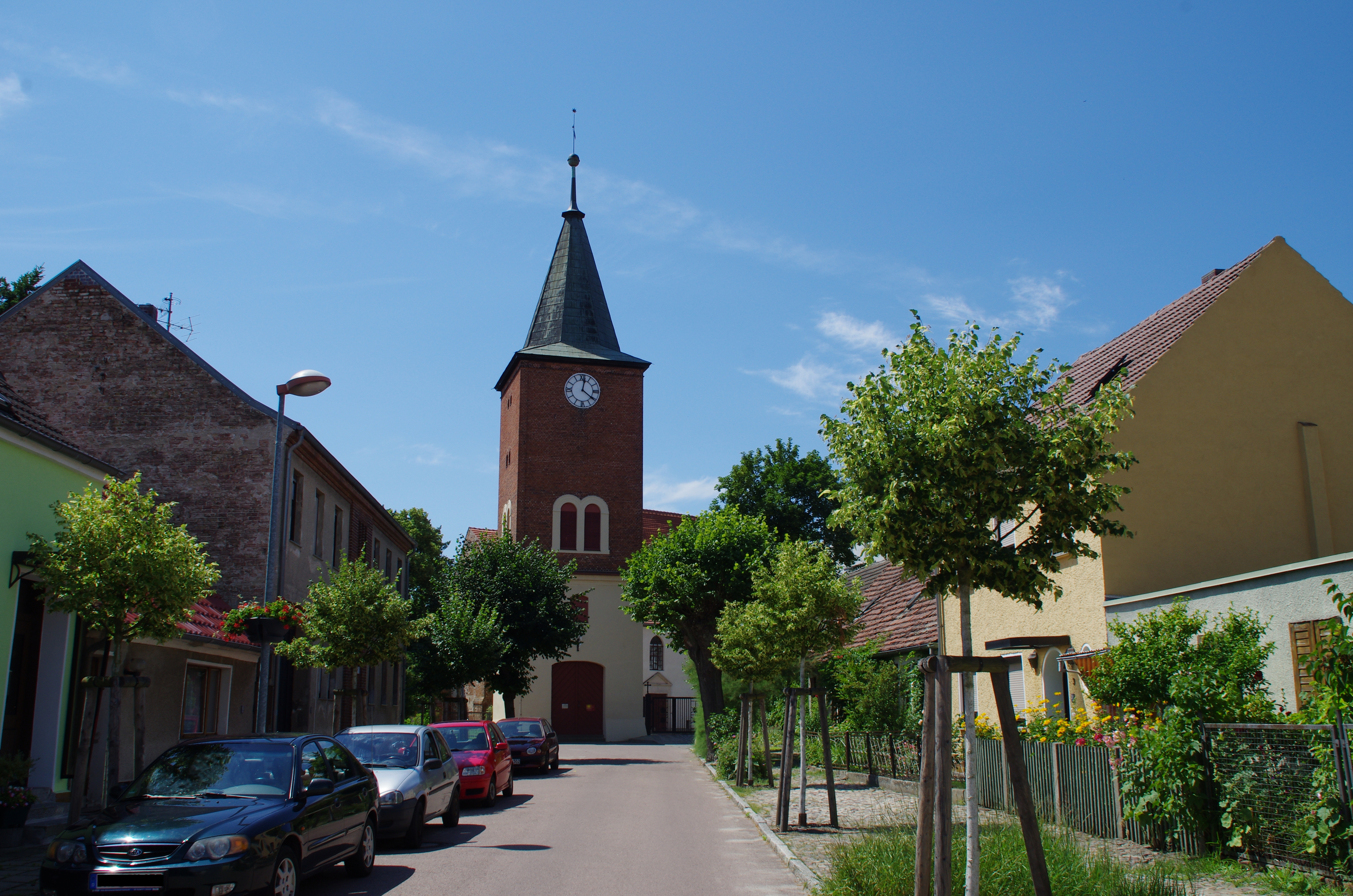
Plaue, Brandenburg

Plaue (German pronunciation: [ˈplaʊə]) is a district of the city of Brandenburg an der Havel.

On December 31, 2015, the district was recorded as having 2,593 inhabitants.

== Geography ==
Plaue lies in the far west of the city administrative area, at the outflow of the Havel from the Plauer See, northeast of the confluence of the Elbe-Havel Canal and the Plauer Canal into the Wendsee. Plaue is on the right bank of the Havel, opposite a flatland that hosts the Brandenburg-Briest Solarpark.

A language school was housed in the Plaue Castle, which was owned by the Count of Königsmarck until 1945.

In addition to the old town center, the Plaue district also includes the residential areas of expansion, Charlottenhof, Gartenstadt, Margaretenhof, Neu Plaue, Plauerhof, Plauer Schleuse and Roberdam.

== History ==
The area of Plaue is known to have been inhabited since the Middle Ages.

A Slavic burial ground dated to the period between the 10th to 12th centuries was discovered in the course of construction work on the Plauerhof street in the summer of 2001. This discovery was a surprise, because the preliminary investigations had only revealed prehistoric findings. The evaluation of the excavations showed that with around 170 documented burials it was the largest discovered burial ground from the period in Havelland up to that time. Most of the dead were buried in a stretched supine position with side arms and an approximate west–east orientation. Three young women were found in a crouched position (de). The graves were arranged individually in rows, mostly without overlaps, which suggested an above-ground marking. The grave pits were in many cases provided with wooden fittings with clear protrusions from the side and cross boards. Some graves showed traces of charring on the wooden fittings, which indicated a rite of fire. Vascular accessories were found in about 30 percent of the graves. Other items such as jewelry and coins were only occasionally proven. The skeletons were examined by Bettina Jungklaus. However, the skeletons were mostly poorly preserved due to the sandy, acidic soil. 40 percent of the buried were in adulthood and 35 percent in childhood. This indicates rather poor living conditions for the rural population of Plaue. There were also signs of malnutrition.

In a 1197 document, a witness is named Henrycus de Plawe. In 1216 the "Fixed House", the castle, in Plaue was mentioned for the first time in a document. Next to this castle, which protected an important Havel crossing, was the Kiez. To the west and a little further from the castle was a street village without a market.

The town of Plaue later emerged from these two civil settlements, which was first designated as such in 1411. The castle and the town were fiercely contested in the 13th and 14th centuries between the Margraviate of Brandenburg and the Archbishopric of Magdeburg. In 1421 it finally came to the Margraviate of Brandenburg. The town and castle were owned by various noble families, vassals of the Archbishop of Magdeburg or the Margrave of Brandenburg.

Plaue was originally a city in the district of West Havelland in the Prussian government district of Potsdam. It was incorporated on July 25, 1952, together with Kirchmöser in the city of Brandenburg an der Havel.
