= Quenzsee =

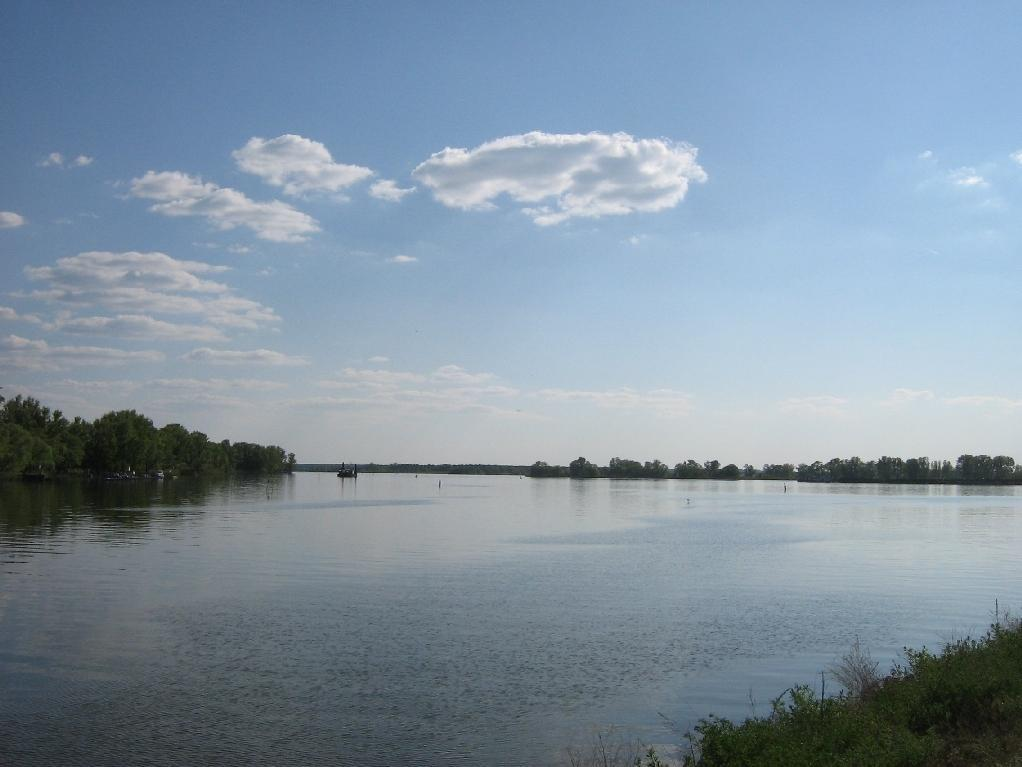

- Location within Brandenburg
- Location: Brandenburg
- Coordinates: 52.410797°N 12.484417°E
- Primary inflows: Silo Canal, Silograben from Gördensee
- Primary outflows: Plauer See
- Basin countries: Germany
- Surface area: 68 hectares (170 acres)
- Max. depth: 3 metres (9.8 ft)

Quenzsee (Quenz Lake) is a lake in the state of Brandenburg, Germany. It is situated to the west of the city of Brandenburg an der Havel, and is one of a number of directly linked lakes, along with the Breitlingsee, Möserscher See, Plauer See and Wendsee.

The lake has a surface area of 68 hectares (170 acres), and has a maximum depth of 3 metres (9.8 ft).

The lake is navigable and has direct access to the Plauer See, and hence the River Havel, at its western end. The Silo Canal enters the lake at its eastern end. Navigation is administered as part of the Untere Havel–Wasserstraße.

During World War II, a converted mansion at the lake served as a sabotage school for spies who would participate in the failed Operation Pastorius.
