= Buckau =

River in Germany

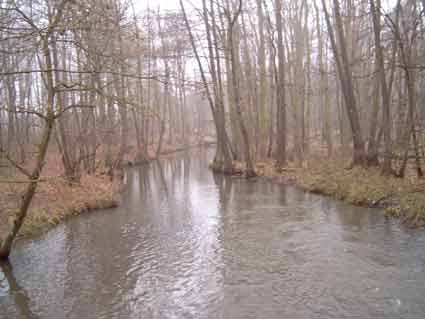

Location
- Country: Germany
- State: Brandenburg

Physical characteristics
- Source
  - location: south of Görzke
  - elevation: 95 m (312 ft)
- Mouth
  - location: southern shore of Breitlingsee
  - coordinates: 52.3657°N 12.4622°E
  - elevation: 28 m (92 ft)
- Length: 35 km (22 mi)

Basin features
- Progression: Havel→ Elbe→ North Sea
- Tributaries
  - right: Riembach, Strynzelbach, Verlorenwasser

Buckau is a river of Brandenburg, Germany. It flows into the Breitlingsee, which is drained by the Havel, near Brandenburg an der Havel.

== See also ==
- List of rivers of Brandenburg
