= Plauer See =

Plauer See may refer to:

- Plauer See (Mecklenburg-Vorpommern), Germany
- Plauer See (Brandenburg), Germany
