= Silo Canal =

German commercial canal

Coordinates: 52°25′23″N 12°31′36″E

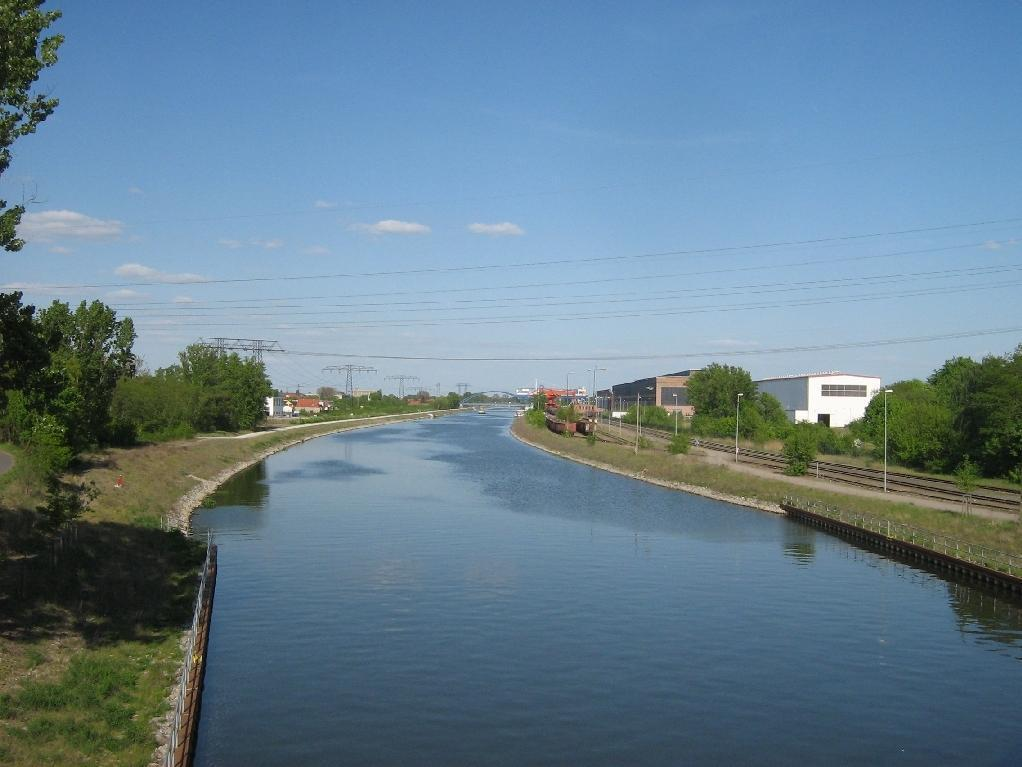
The Silo Canal

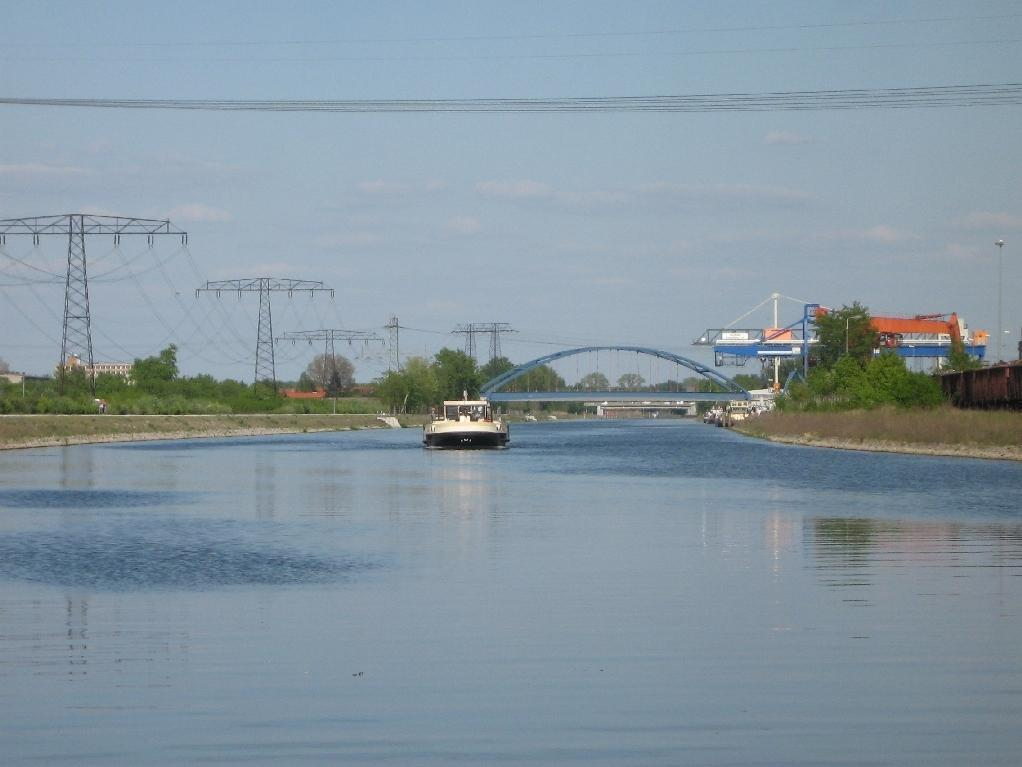
Navigation on the canal

The Silo Canal, or Silokanal in German, is a canal in the German state of Brandenburg. It provides a short cut for vessels navigating the River Havel, avoiding the winding and constricted navigation through the city of Brandenburg an der Havel.

The 5.26-kilometre (3.27 mi) long canal follows the route of the Silograben of 1782, and was constructed between 1907 and 1910. At its upstream end, the Vorstadtschleuse Brandenburg lock descends 1 metre (3 ft 3 in) into the lower level of the Havel, known as the Brandenburger Niederhavel, where a junction is also made with the Beetzsee. From here the canal proper skirts the northern edge of the city, eventually flowing into the Quenzsee, which links to the Plauer See and hence the River Havel and the Elbe–Havel Canal.

Whilst commercial shipping uses the Silo Canal, leisure traffic tends to use the older and smaller dimensioned Brandenburg City Canal, which diverges upstream of the Vorstadtschleuse Brandenburg and passes through the city centre, before descending through the Stadtschleuse Brandenburg lock. This traffic then follows the Brandenburger Niederhavel downstream into the Breitlingsee before rejoining the main route in the Plauer See.
