= Brandenburg City Canal =

Canal in Germany

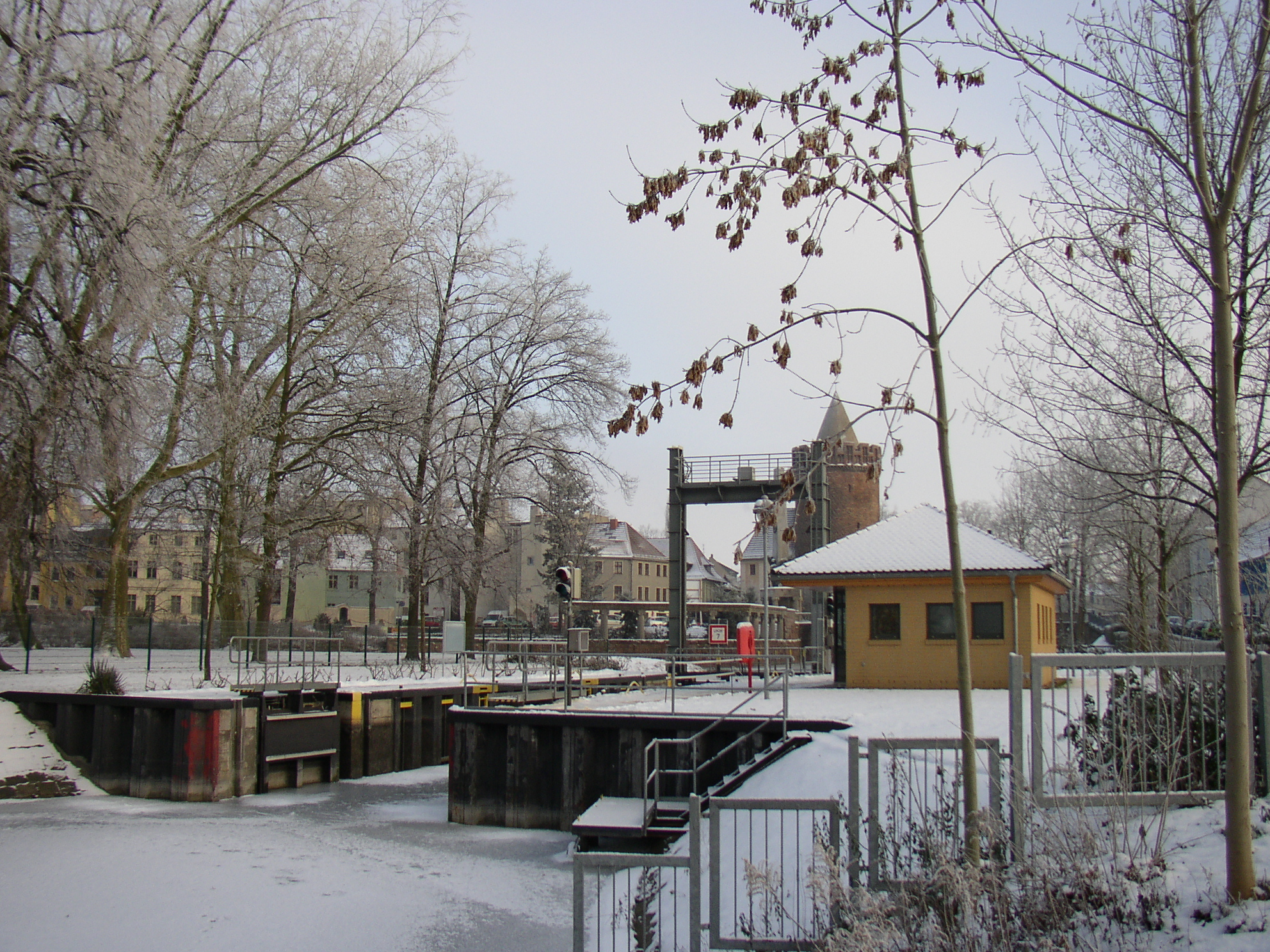
The Stadtschleuse on the Brandenburg City Canal in winter

The Brandenburg City Canal, or Brandenburger Stadtkanal in German, is a canal in the German state of Brandenburg. It provides a 4-kilometre (2.5 mi) route through the centre of the city of Brandenburg an der Havel.

At its upstream end, the canal diverges from the River Havel upstream of the Vorstadtschleuse Brandenburg lock. It then passes through the city centre, before descending through the Stadtschleuse Brandenburg lock into a lower level of the River Havel, here known as the Brandenburger Niederhavel. Traffic from the canal then follows the Brandenburger Niederhavel downstream.

The Brandenburg City Canal is now largely used by leisure traffic, due to its constrained size. Commercial shipping uses the Silo Canal, which descends through the Vorstadtschleuse Brandenburg, crosses the Brandenburger Niederhavel upstream of the city centre and then skirts the northern edge of the city, before rejoining the River Havel in the Plauer See.
