= Wendsee =

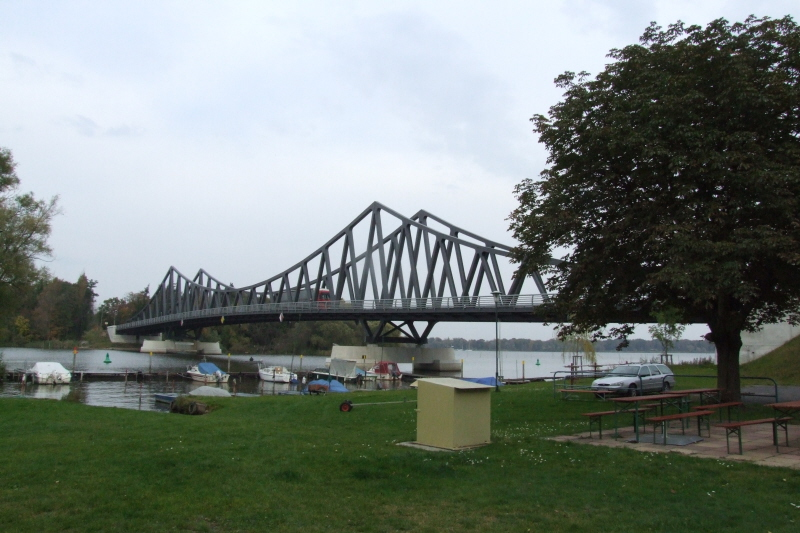
- The Seegartenbrücke spans the exit from the Wendsee into the Plauer See

- Location within Brandenburg
- Location: Brandenburg
- Coordinates: 52.410797°N 12.484417°E
- Primary inflows: Elbe–Havel Canal, channel from Wusterwitzer See
- Primary outflows: Plauer See
- Basin countries: Germany
- Surface area: 80 hectares (200 acres)
- Max. depth: 4.9 metres (16 ft)

Wendsee is a lake in the state of Brandenburg, Germany. It is situated to the west of the city of Brandenburg an der Havel, and is one of a number of directly linked lakes, along with the Breitlingsee, Möserscher See, Plauer See, and Quenzsee. The lake has a surface area of 80 hectares (200 acres), and has a maximum depth of 4.9 metres (16 ft).

The lake is navigable and has direct access to the Plauer See, and hence the River Havel, at its eastern end, where it is spanned by the Seegartenbrücke. The Elbe–Havel Canal enters the lake at its western end. A short navigable channel also links the southern end of the Wendsee to the Wusterwitzer See. Navigation is administered as part of the Elbe–Havel Canal.
