= Breitlingsee =

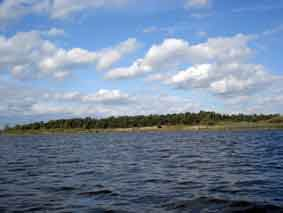

- Location within Brandenburg
- Location: Brandenburg
- Coordinates: 52.386287°N 12.477894°E
- Primary inflows: River Havel, River Plane and River Buckau
- Primary outflows: Plauer See
- Basin countries: Germany
- Surface area: 5.13 square kilometres (1.98 sq mi)

The Breitlingsee, or Breitling See, is a lake in the state of Brandenburg, Germany. It is situated to the west of the city of Brandenburg an der Havel, and is one of a number of directly linked lakes, along with the Möserscher See, Plauer See, Quenzsee and Wendsee. The lake has a surface area of 5.13 square kilometres (1.98 sq mi).

The navigable River Havel flows through the lake, entering from the east and exiting directly into the Plauer See. Navigation is administered as part of the Untere Havel–Wasserstraße.
