= Strynzelbach =

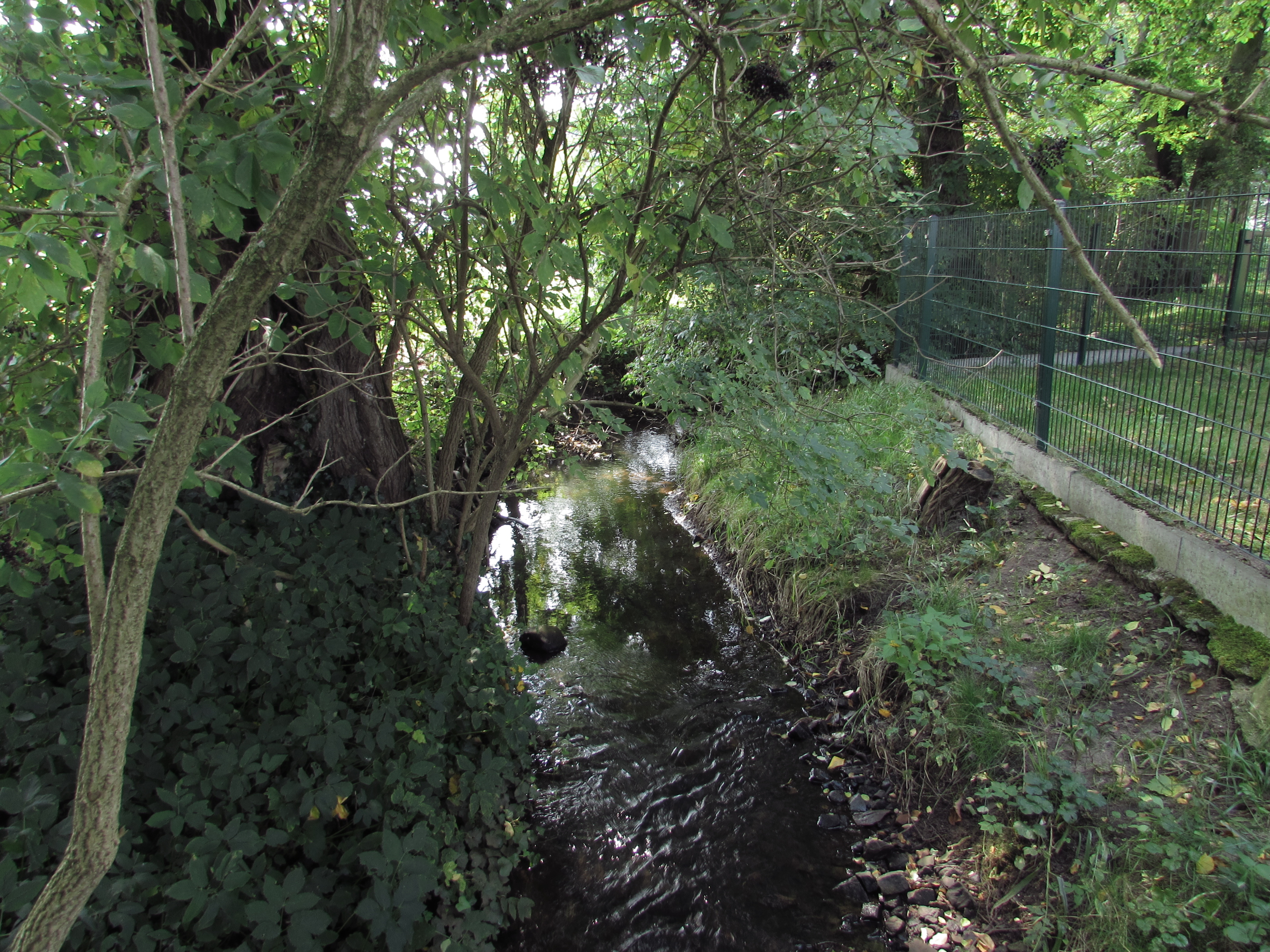
- The Strynzelbach near Bücknitz

Location
- Location: Potsdam-Mittelmark, Brandenburg, Germany
- Reference no.: DE: 587252

Physical characteristics
- Source
  - location: Branch off: From the Herrenmühlengraben
  - coordinates: 52°16′20″N 12°19′45″E
- Mouth
  - location: East of Bücknitz
  - coordinates: 52°16′55″N 12°20′24″E
- Length: 1.424 km
- Basin size: 68 ha

Basin features
- Progression: Buckau→ Havel→ Elbe→ North Sea
- River system: Elbe
- Landmarks: Small towns: Ziesar

The Strynzelbach is a stream that begins near Herrenmühle on the Herrenmühlengraben in the borough of Ziesar in the German district of Potsdam-Mittelmark. It drains northwards into the river Buckau.
