= Plauer See (Brandenburg) =

Lake in Brandenburg an der Havel, Germany

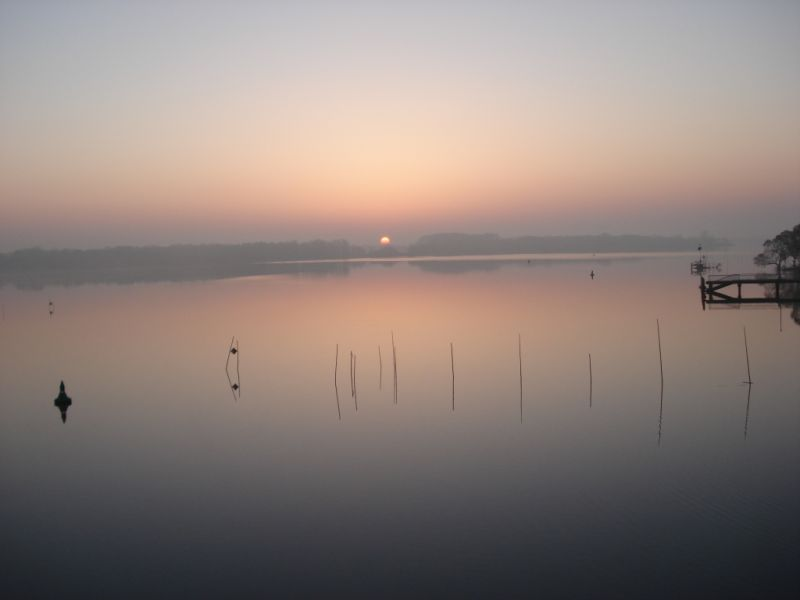
- Sunrise over the Plauer See

- Location within Brandenburg
- Location: Brandenburg
- Coordinates: 52.397706°N 12.433262°E
- Primary inflows: Breitlingsee, Möserschen See, Wendsee and Quenzsee
- Primary outflows: River Havel
- Basin countries: Germany
- Surface area: 6.4 km^{2} (2.5 sq mi)
- Max. depth: 6.7 m (22 ft)

Plauer See (German pronunciation: [ˈplaʊɐ ˈzeː]) is a lake in the state of Brandenburg, Germany. It is situated to the west of the city of Brandenburg an der Havel, and is one of a number of directly linked lakes, along with the Breitlingsee, Möserscher See, Quenzsee and Wendsee.

The lake has a surface area of 6.4 square kilometres (2.5 sq mi), and has a maximum depth of 6.7 metres (22 ft).

The navigable River Havel flows through the lake, entering from directly from the Breitlingsee, and exiting downstream at Plaue. The Elbe–Havel Canal connects to the River Havel in the Plauer See, having transited the Wendsee. The Silo Canal bypasses a stretch of upstream Havel and enters the Plauer See via the Quenzsee. Navigation is administered as part of the Untere Havel–Wasserstraße.
