= Brandenburg an der Havel =

Town in Brandenburg, Germany

- Town
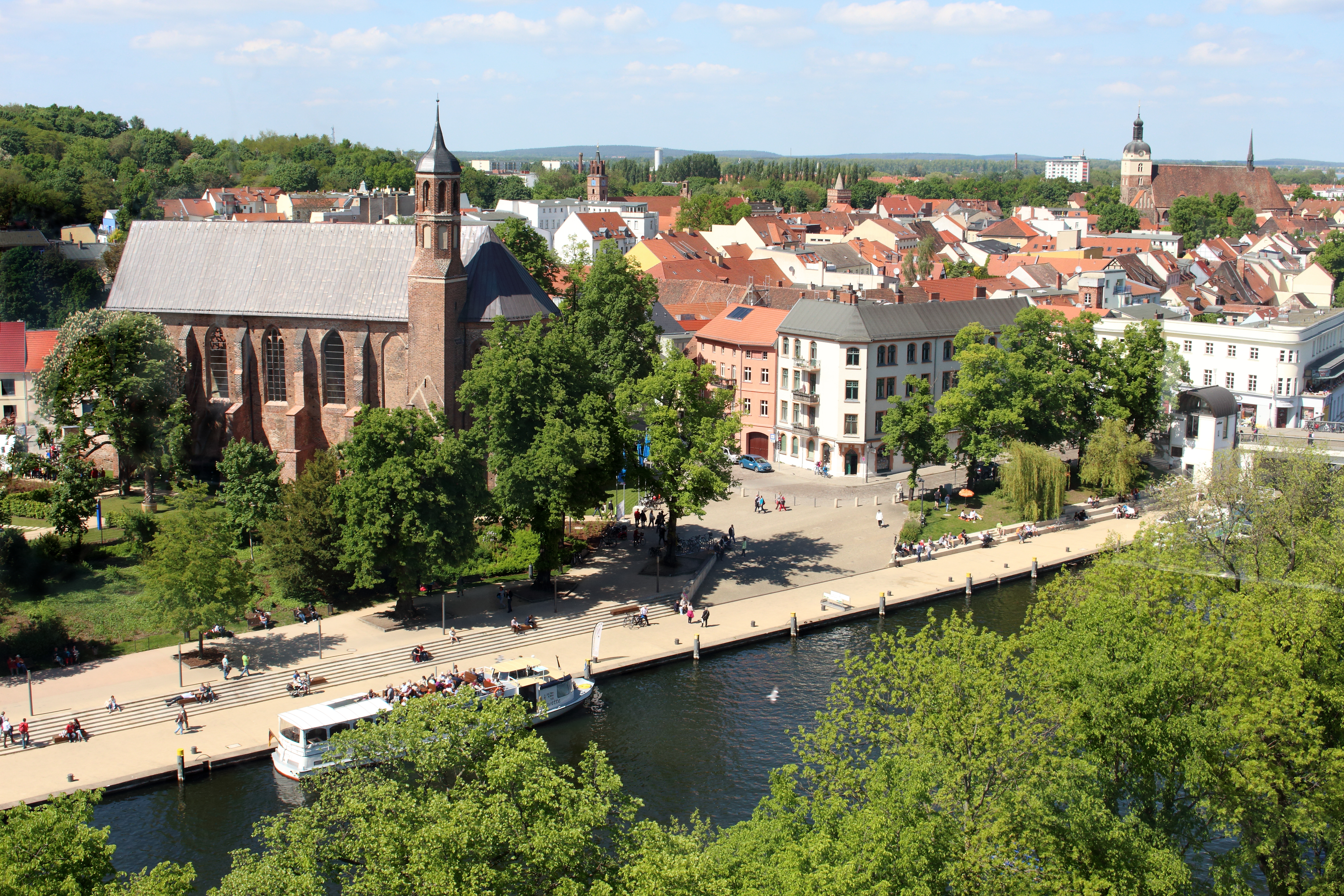
- Brandenburg an der Havel in May 2015

- Flag Coat of arms
- Interactive map of Brandenburg an der Havel
- Location within Germany Location within Brandenburg
- Coordinates: 52°25′N 12°32′E
- Country: Germany
- State: Brandenburg
- District: Urban district

Government
  - Mayor (2026–34): Daniel Keip (SPD)

Area
  - Total: 228.80 km^{2} (88.34 sq mi)
- Elevation: 32 m (105 ft)

Population (2025-12-31)
  - Total: 73,945
  - Density: 323.19/km^{2} (837.05/sq mi)
- Time zone: UTC+01:00 (CET)
  - Summer (DST): UTC+02:00 (CEST)
- Postal codes: 14770, 14772, 14774, 14776
- Dialling codes: 03381
- Vehicle registration: BRB
- Website: www.stadt-brandenburg.de

Brandenburg an der Havel (German pronunciation: [ˈbʁandn̩bʊʁk ʔan deːɐ̯ ˈhaːfl̩]) is a town in the federal state of Brandenburg, Germany, which served as the capital of the Margraviate of Brandenburg until it was replaced by Berlin in 1417.

With a population of 73,945 (as of 2025), it is located on the banks of the River Havel. The town of Brandenburg provided the name for the medieval Bishopric of Brandenburg, the Margraviate of Brandenburg and the current state of Brandenburg. Today, it is a small town compared to nearby Berlin but was the original nucleus of the former realms of Brandenburg and Prussia.

== History ==
=== Middle Ages ===
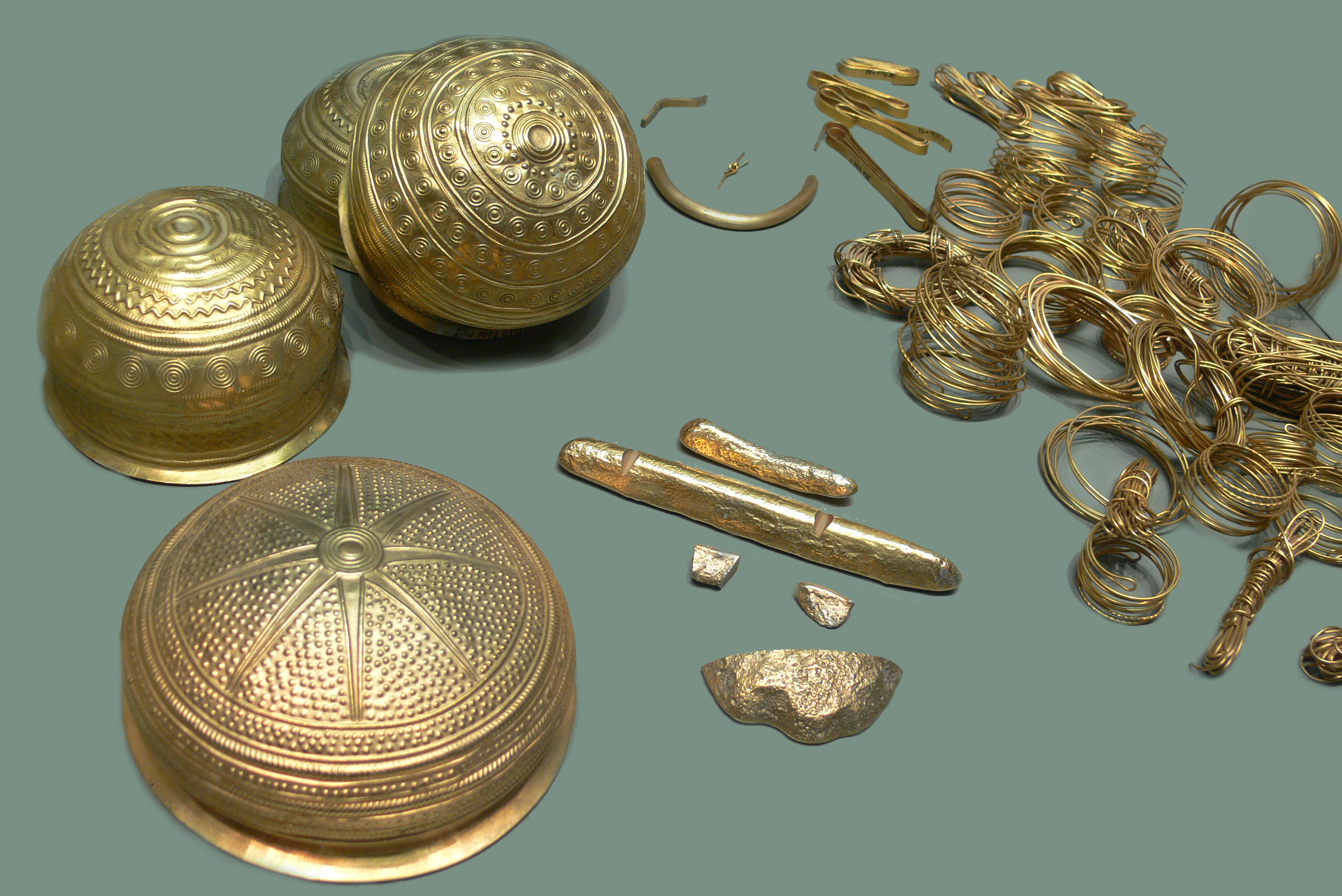
Items from the Eberswalde Hoard (replica; Museum für Vor- und Frühgeschichte, Berlin)

The name of the city is a combination of two words braniti – to protect/defend and bor – forest/wood. Brenna, which had been a fort of the West Slavic tribe Stodoranie, was conquered in 929 after the Battle of Lenzen by the German King Henry the Fowler of Saxony. It was at this time first mentioned in documents as Brennaburg. By the death of King Henry all the tribes between the Middle Elbe and Middle Oder paid tribute to the German King. At the Magdeburg Assembly of Princes in 948 the Bishoprics of Brandenburg and Havelburg were established. The Holy Roman Emperor Otto I took control of these new sees. In Slavic revolt of 983 there was a major Slav uprising involving numerous tribes and until the middle of the 12th century the area east of the Elbe remained under their control. During this period the area was ruled by Slavic chiefs of the Hevelli tribe. The last of them, Pribislav, died in 1150.

Following Pribislav's death his widow Petrissa enabled Albert I of Brandenburg to take over Brenna. Albert was driven out of Brenna by Jaksa of Kopanica and returned there after a long siege only in 1157 by agreement and provide it with a joint German-Slav garrison. Albert now styled himself Margrave of Brandenburg. By 1160 systematic settlement of the Elbe-Havel-Spree basin by nobility, burghers, and peasants from the Schwabengau area (Harz), the Netherlands, the Rhineland, and Westphalia was in progress. In 1165 the foundation stone for a cathedral was laid on the cathedral island of Brandenburg. It was consecrated five years later in the presence of Albert the Bear and his sons. The town was restricted to the western bank of the Havel until 1196, when it was extended to the eastern side. The parts on either side of the river were regarded as three towns (Old Town, New Town and Brandenburg cathedral district) for centuries.

In 1314–1315 the Old and New Towns joined the Hanseatic League. In the Thirty Years' War (1618–1648) the towns suffered plundering and destruction; this caused Potsdam to become the new capital, and the court left the town of Brandenburg. In 1715, Old Town and New Town were merged to form a single town. In 1928, the Brandenburg cathedral district was added.

=== Modern history ===
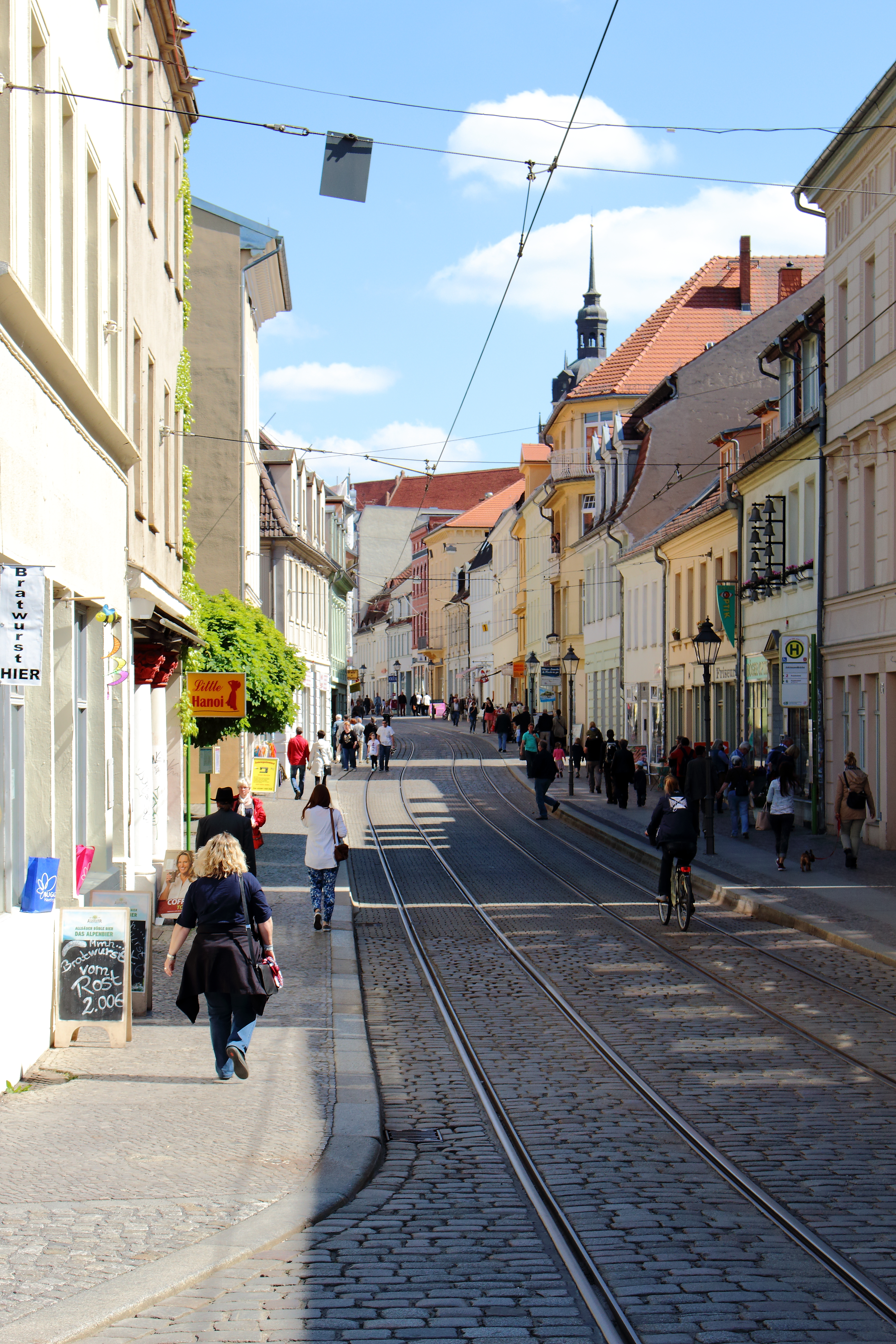
Brandenburg an der Havel old town in 2015

In the late 19th century Brandenburg an der Havel became a very important industrial center in the German Empire. Steel industries settled there, and several bicycle brands such as Brennabor, Corona and Excelsior were manufactured in the city. A toy industry was also established. A giant industrial complex belonging to Deutsche Reichsbahn (German Imperial Railways) was located in Brandenburg-Kirchmöser between the two world wars and under the former GDR.

In 1933/34, a concentration camp, one of the first in Nazi Germany, was located on Neuendorfer Straße in Brandenburg Old Town. After closing this inner city concentration camp, the Nazis used the Brandenburg-Görden Prison, located in the suburb of Görden. Later the old jail became the Brandenburg Euthanasia Centre where the Nazis murdered people with psychiatric disorders, including children. This programme later came to be known as "Action T4" because of the Berlin address, Tiergartenstraße 4, the headquarters of this planned and well-organized forced euthanasia organisation. Brandenburg an der Havel was one of the first locations in Nazi Germany where the Nazis experimented with murdering their victims by gas. The lessons here were later applied for mass murders in Auschwitz and other extermination camps.

In 1934, the Arado Aircraft Company (Arado Flugzeugwerke), which originated in Warnemünde, built a satellite factory in Brandenburg that began producing planes in 1935. The factory was expanded over the next five years, and produced trainers and other aircraft for the Luftwaffe during World War II. The existence of this factory was one of the reasons Brandenburg was heavily bombed in later stages of the war; by 1945, 70% of the city was destroyed.

Friedrich Fromm, a German officer involved in the 20 July plot to assassinate Adolf Hitler, was executed here in March 1945 for his part in the plot, even though Fromm betrayed those conspirators he knew and ordered their execution.

On 25 July 1952 Plaue and Kirchmöser were incorporated in the city of Brandenburg an der Havel.

After German reunification the city's population declined from around 100,000 in 1989 to roughly 75,000 in 2005 through emigration. The migration was mainly by young people.

== Demography ==
Development of population since 1875 within the current boundaries (blue line: population; dotted line: comparison to population development of Brandenburg state)

Recent population development and projections (population development before 2011 census (blue line); recent population development according to the Census in Germany in 2011 and 2022 (blue bordered line); official projection for 2024–2040 in three variants (dotted lines 2025–2040)

Brandenburg an der Havel: Population development
within the current boundaries (2025)

Year	Pop.	±% p.a.
1875	34,052	—
1890	44,664	+1.82%
1910	60,339	+1.52%
1925	70,519	+1.04%
1933	74,800	+0.74%
1939	91,208	+3.36%
1946	85,180	−0.97%

Year	Pop.	±% p.a.
1950	83,434	−0.52%
1964	92,741	+0.76%
1971	96,929	+0.63%
1981	97,510	+0.06%
1985	97,615	+0.03%
1990	93,015	−0.96%
1995	86,753	−1.38%

Year	Pop.	±% p.a.
2000	78,404	−2.00%
2005	74,129	−1.12%
2010	71,778	−0.64%
2015	71,574	−0.06%
2020	72,040	+0.13%
2025	73,945	+0.52%

== Transport ==
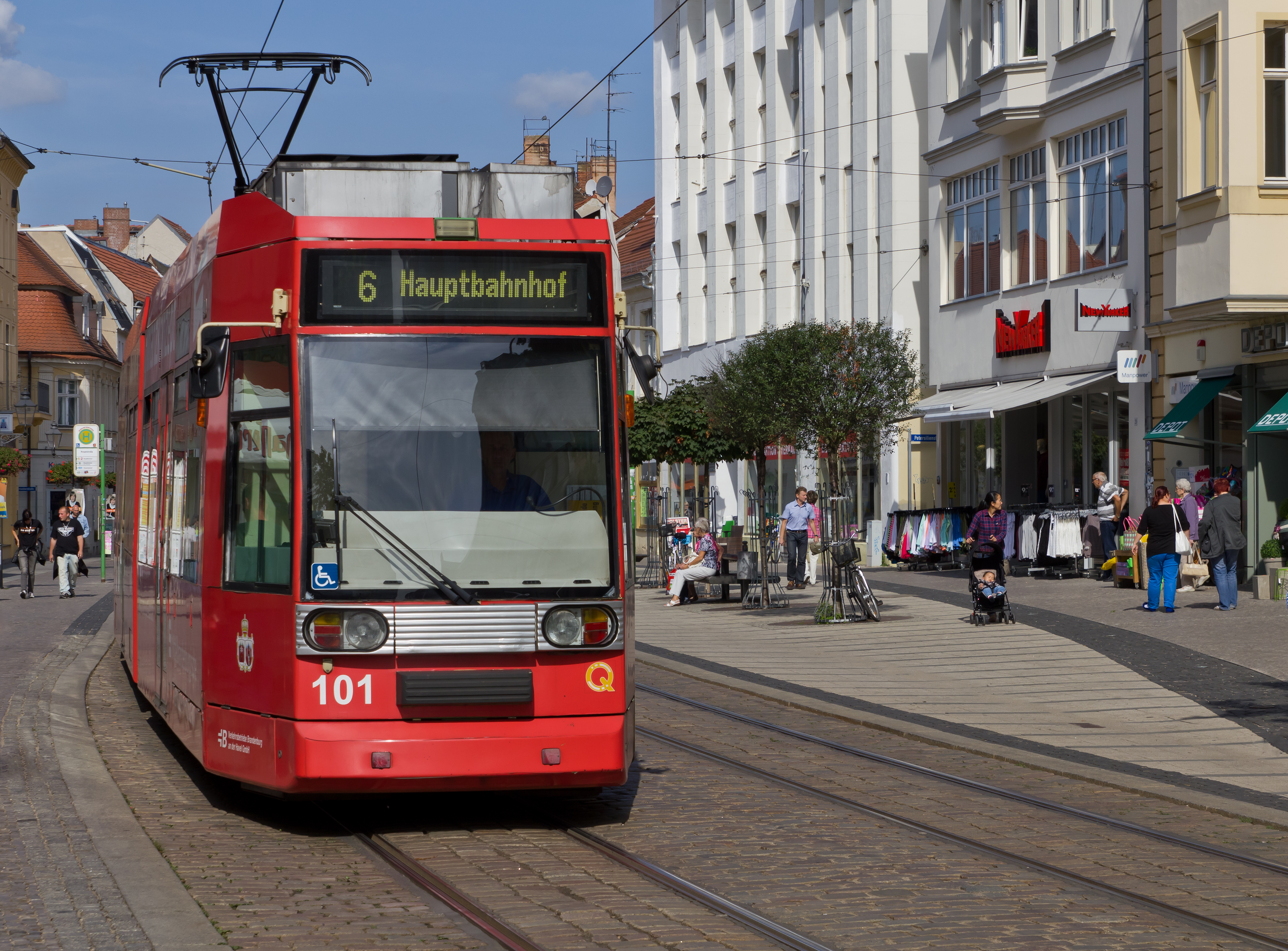
Tram in Brandenburg an der Havel

The city is located on the navigable River Havel, a European Waterway, and vessels travelling through the city have a choice of two routes. The original route used the Brandenburg City Canal, a 4-kilometre (2.5 mi) route through the city centre that descends through the Stadtschleuse Brandenburg, but this route is constrained in size and now limited to leisure craft. Commercial traffic instead uses the Silo Canal that passes through the eastern and northern fringes of the city.

The city is located at the junction of Federal Highways 1 and 102 and the A2 autobahn is nearby. The Berlin and Magdeburg railway also runs through Brandenburg an der Havel.

The centrepiece of the city's urban public transport system is the Brandenburg an der Havel tramway network.

== Sights ==
Panoramic view over Brandenburg

The Dominsel (Cathedral Island) is the historic heart of the town. Here stands its oldest edifice: the St. Peter and Paul Cathedral. Although construction began in the Romanesque style in 1165, it was completed as a Gothic cathedral during the 14th century. While the exterior is rather austere, the cathedral surprises the visitor with its sumptuous interior, especially the painted vault of the Bunte Kapelle (Coloured Chapel) and the Wagner organ (1725), one of the most famous Baroque organs in Germany.

The Katharinenkirche (St. Catherine's Church) built in 1401 in the Neustadt is an impressive example of northern German brick Gothic architecture. The Gotthardtkirche (St. Gotthardt's Church) was built of the same material just a few years later.

Another interesting building is the Altstädtisches Rathaus (Old Town Hall), a late Gothic brick building with stepped gables and an ornate portal. In front of it stands a 5.35m high statue of the knight Roland. Made of sandstone, the statue was erected in 1474 as a symbol of the town's independence.

There is also a part of Brandenburg's medieval city wall, with four preserved watchtowers: Steintorturm and Mühlentorturm (in the New Town), and Rathenower Torturm and Plauer Torturm (in the Old Town).

The Brandenburg Industrial Museum is an Anchor Point of ERIH, The European Route of Industrial Heritage. Brandenburg has its own theatre (Brandenburger Theater), a professional symphony orchestra (Brandenburger Symphoniker) and a wide range of local history and archaeology museums.

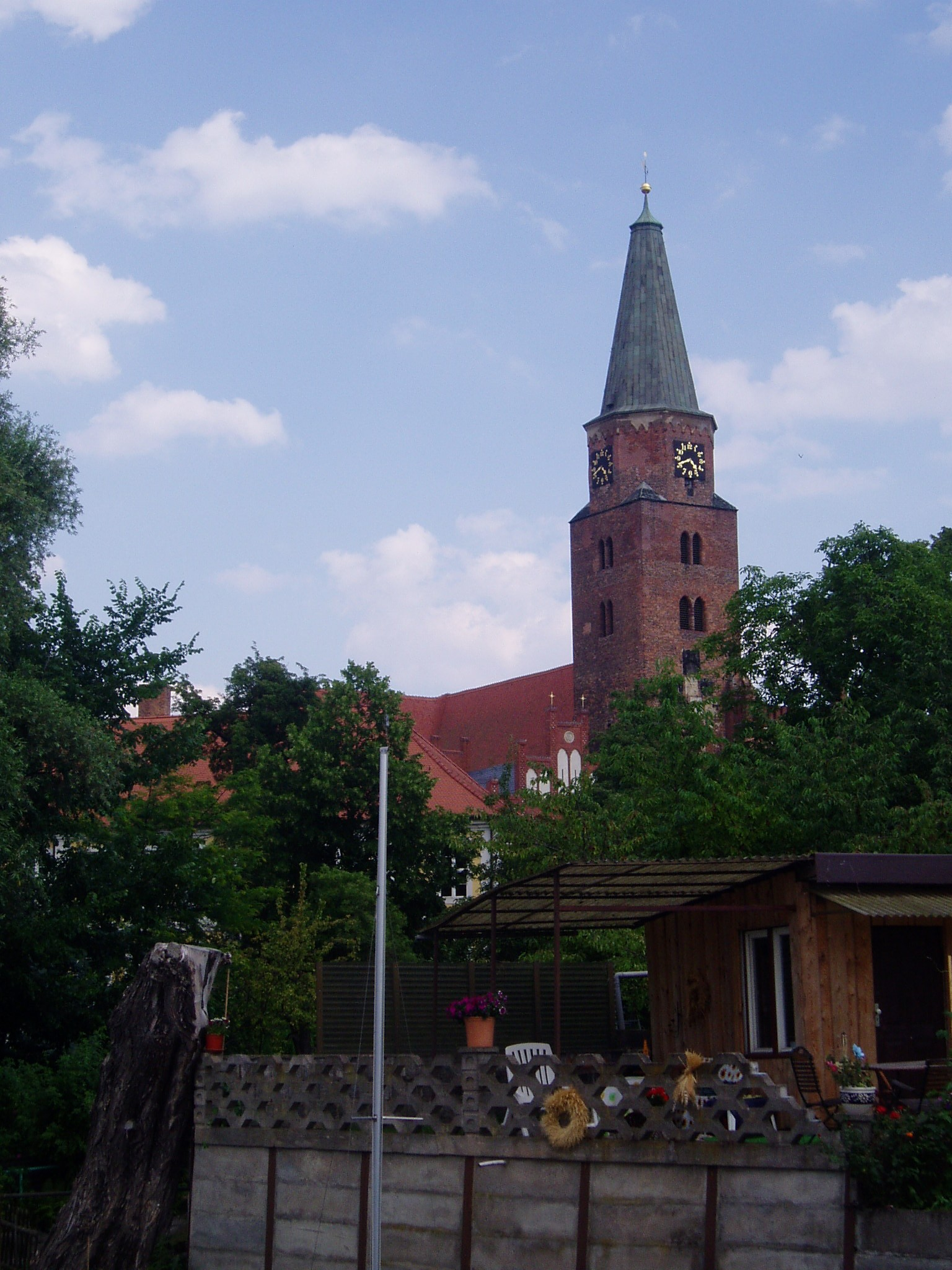
Brandenburg Cathedral

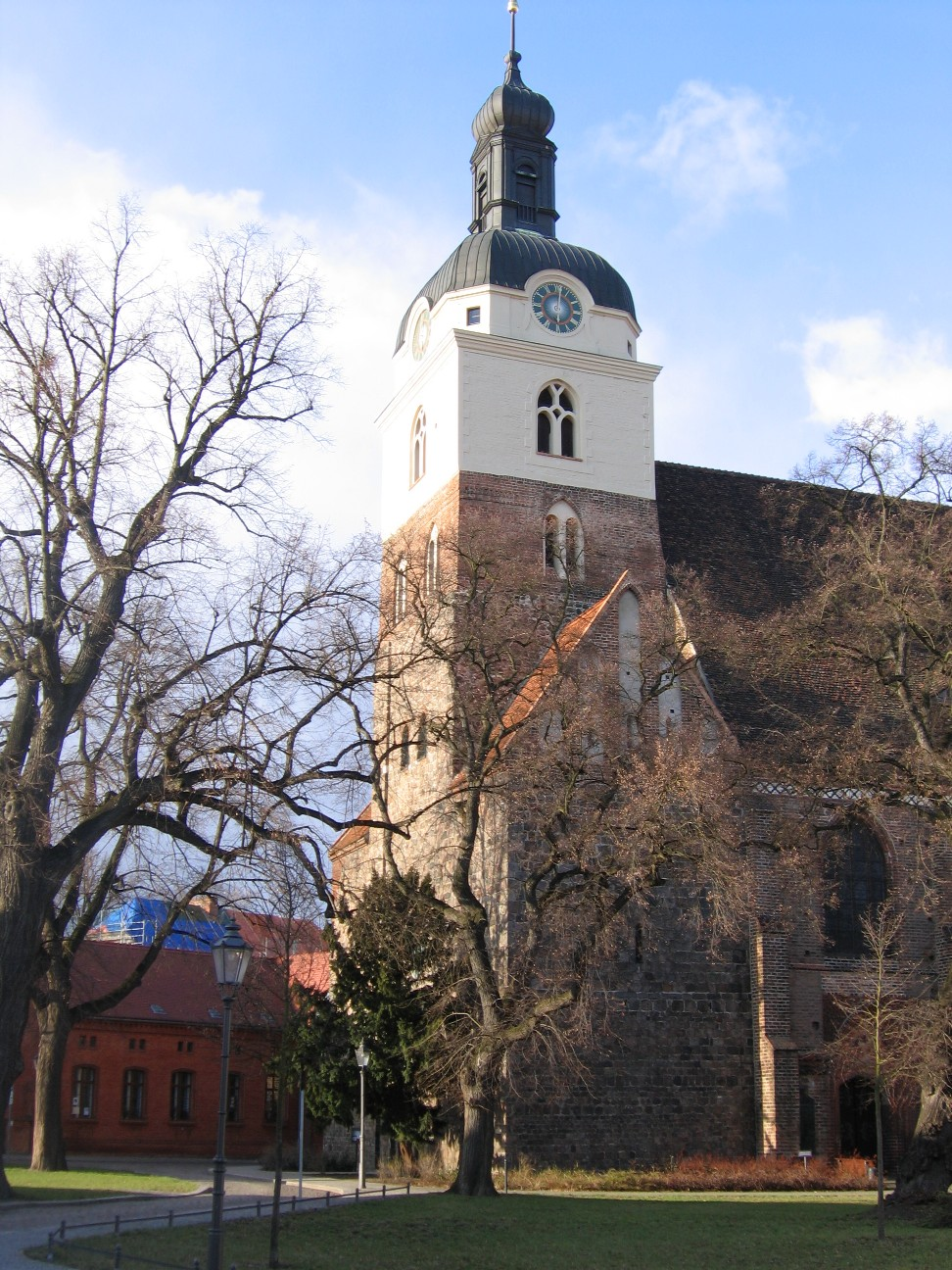
St. Gotthardt's Church

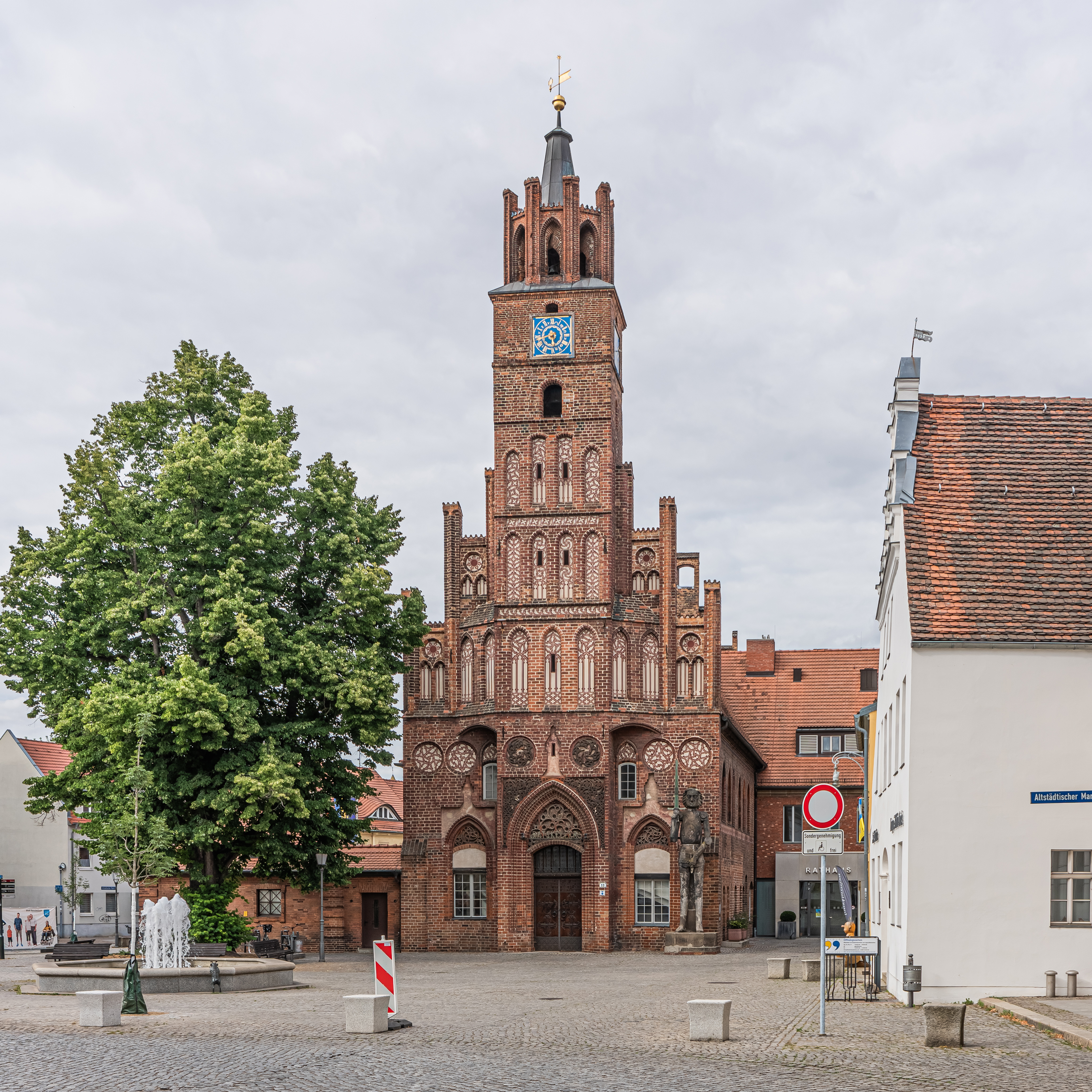
Altstädtischer Markt, Old Town Hall

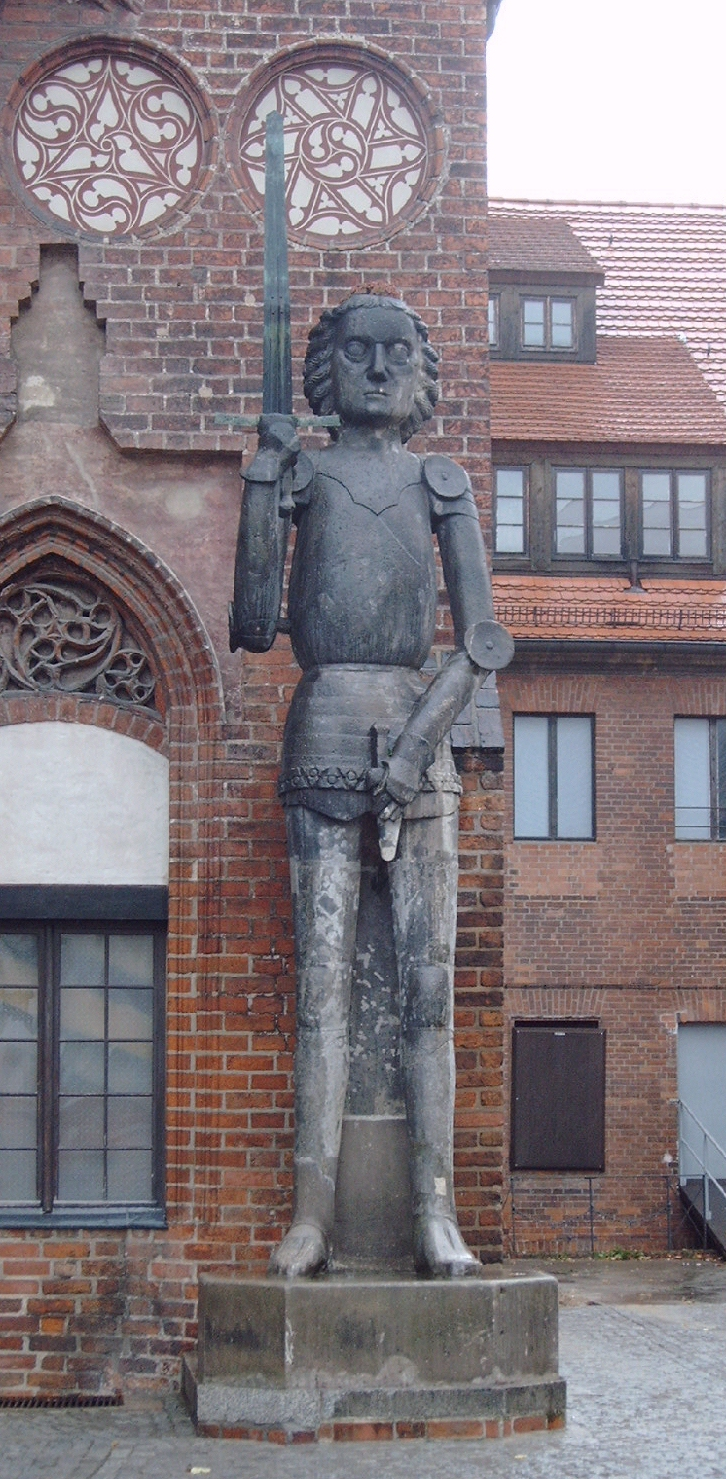
Roland statue in front of the Old Town Hall

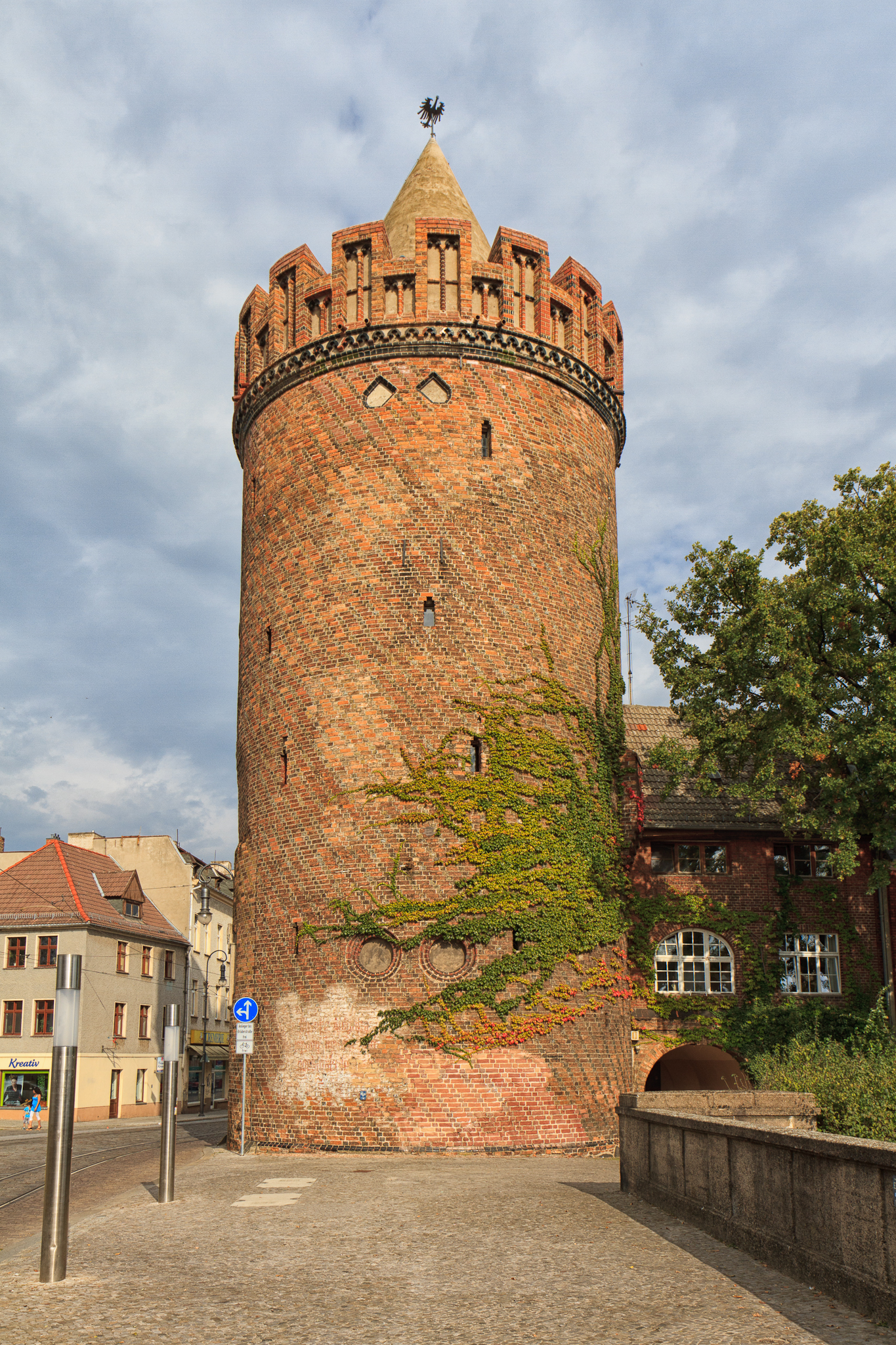
Steintorturm

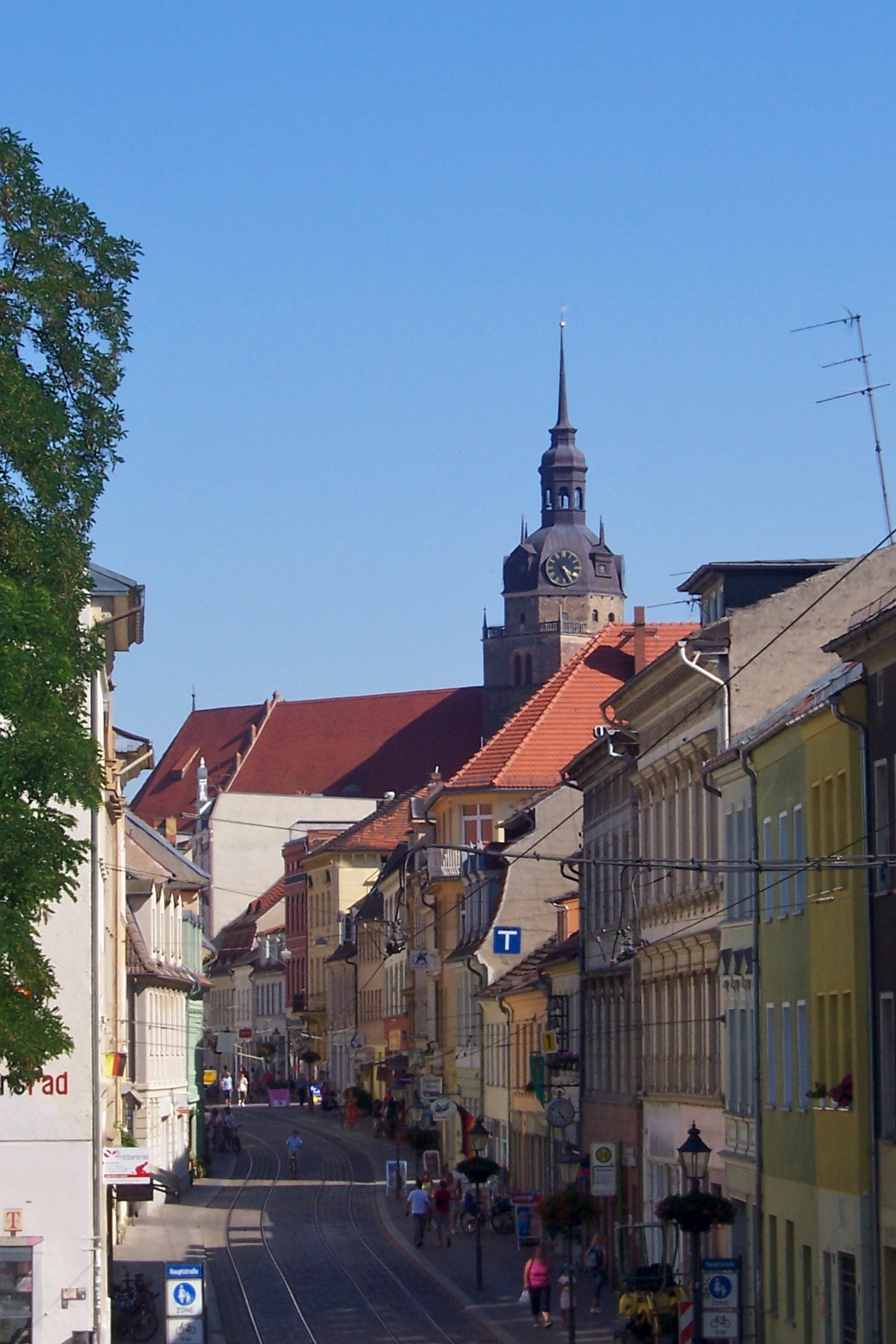
Hauptstraße and St. Catherine's Church

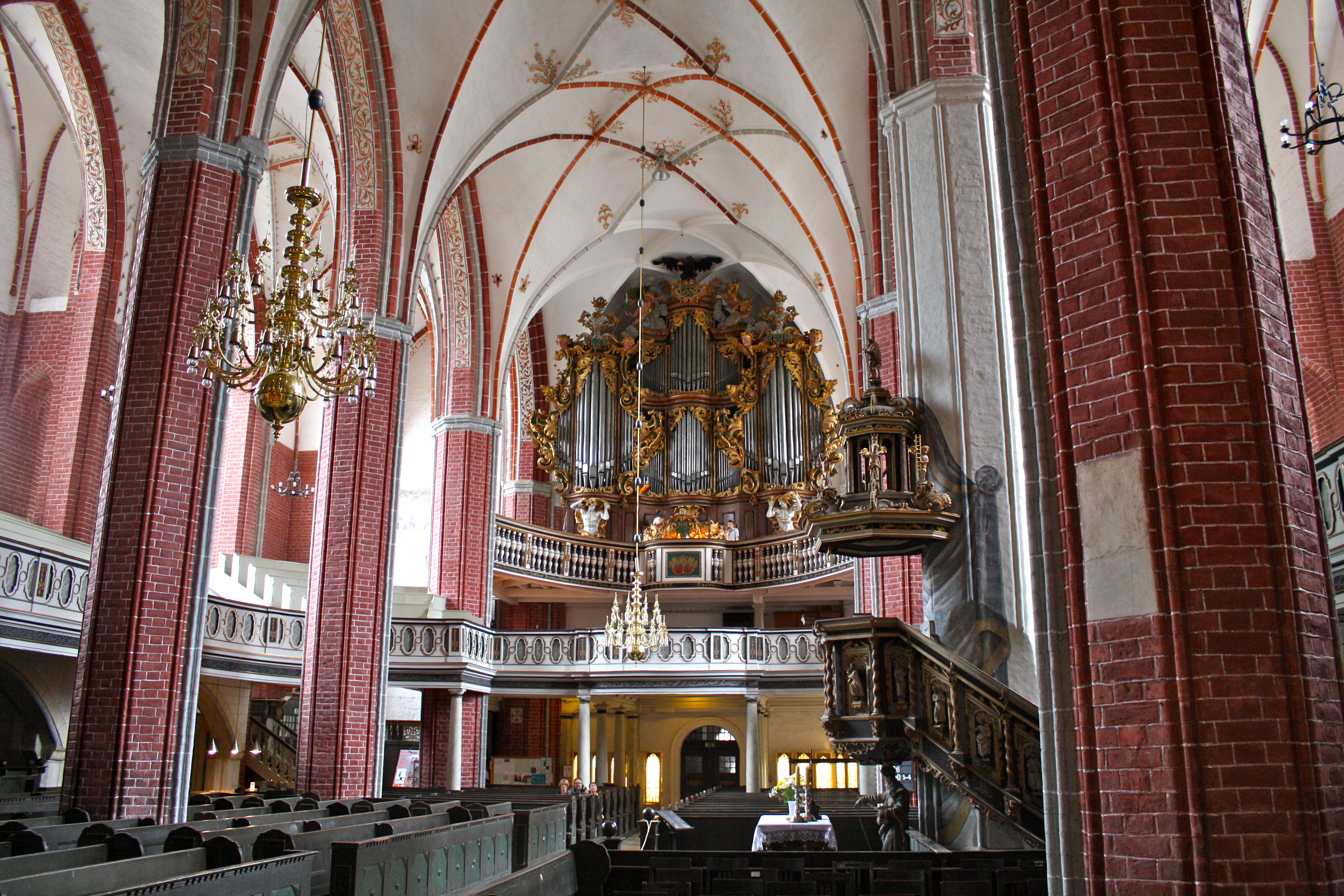
St. Catherine's Church

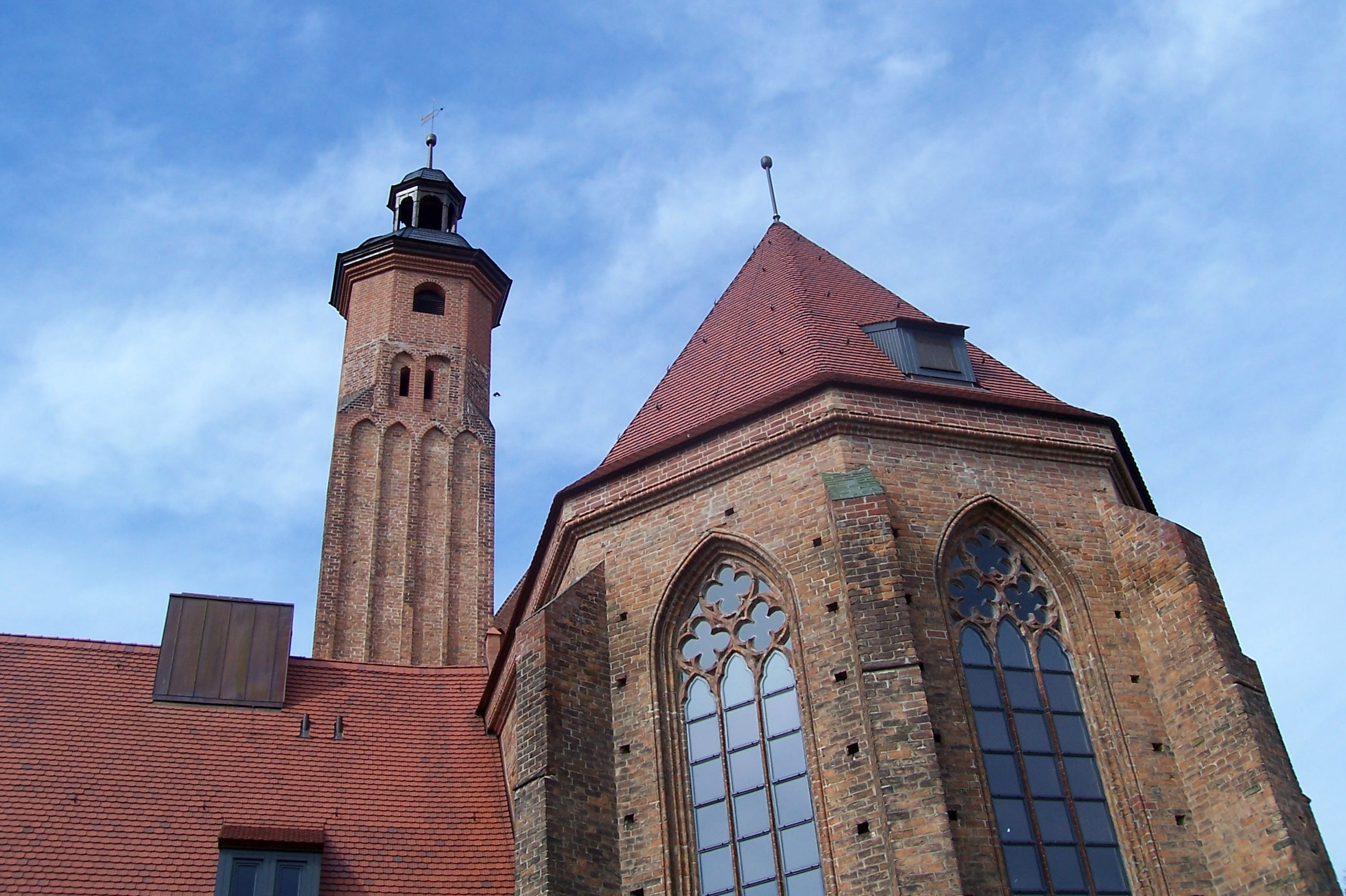
Archaeological Museum (former St. Paul's Church)

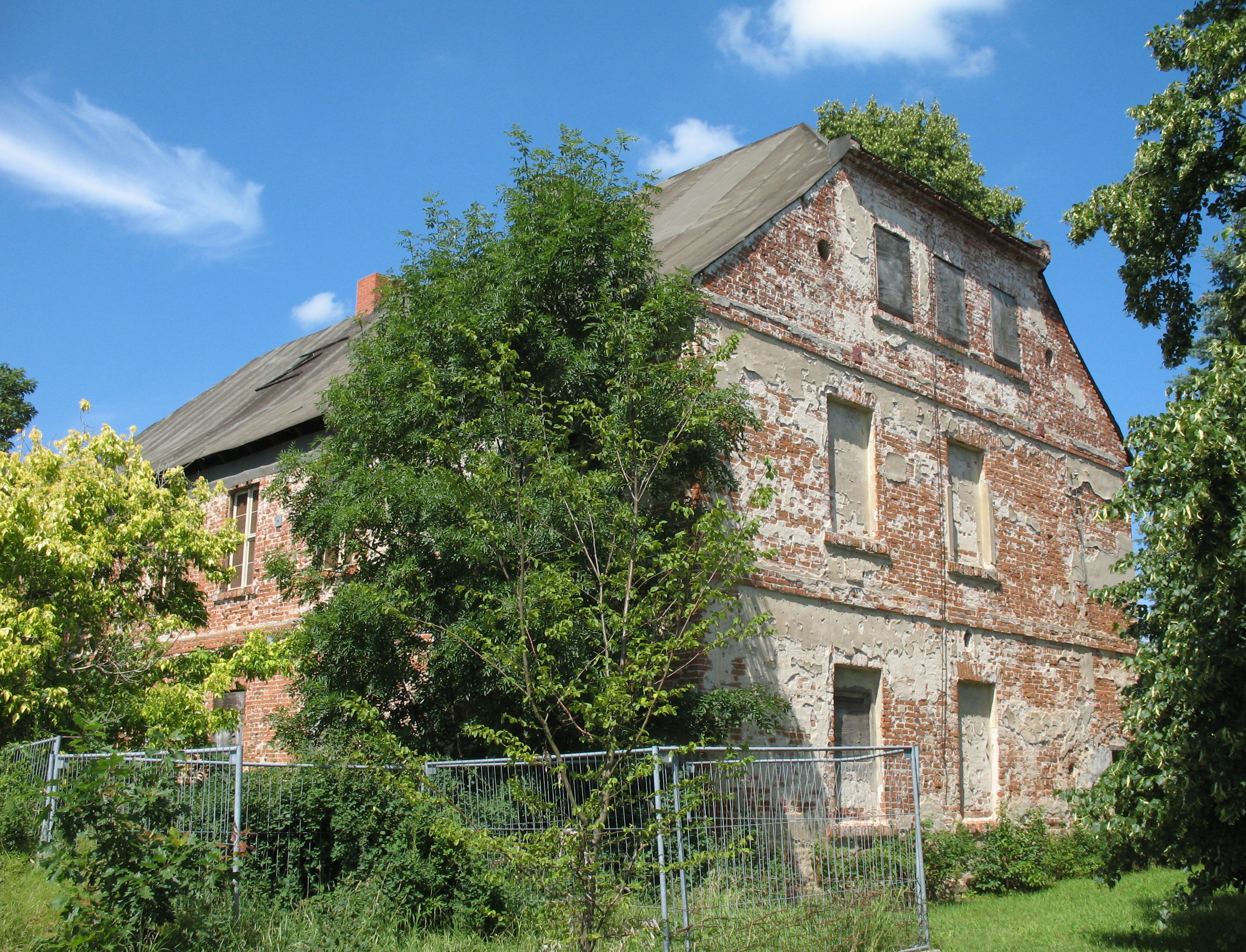
Manor in Mahlenzien

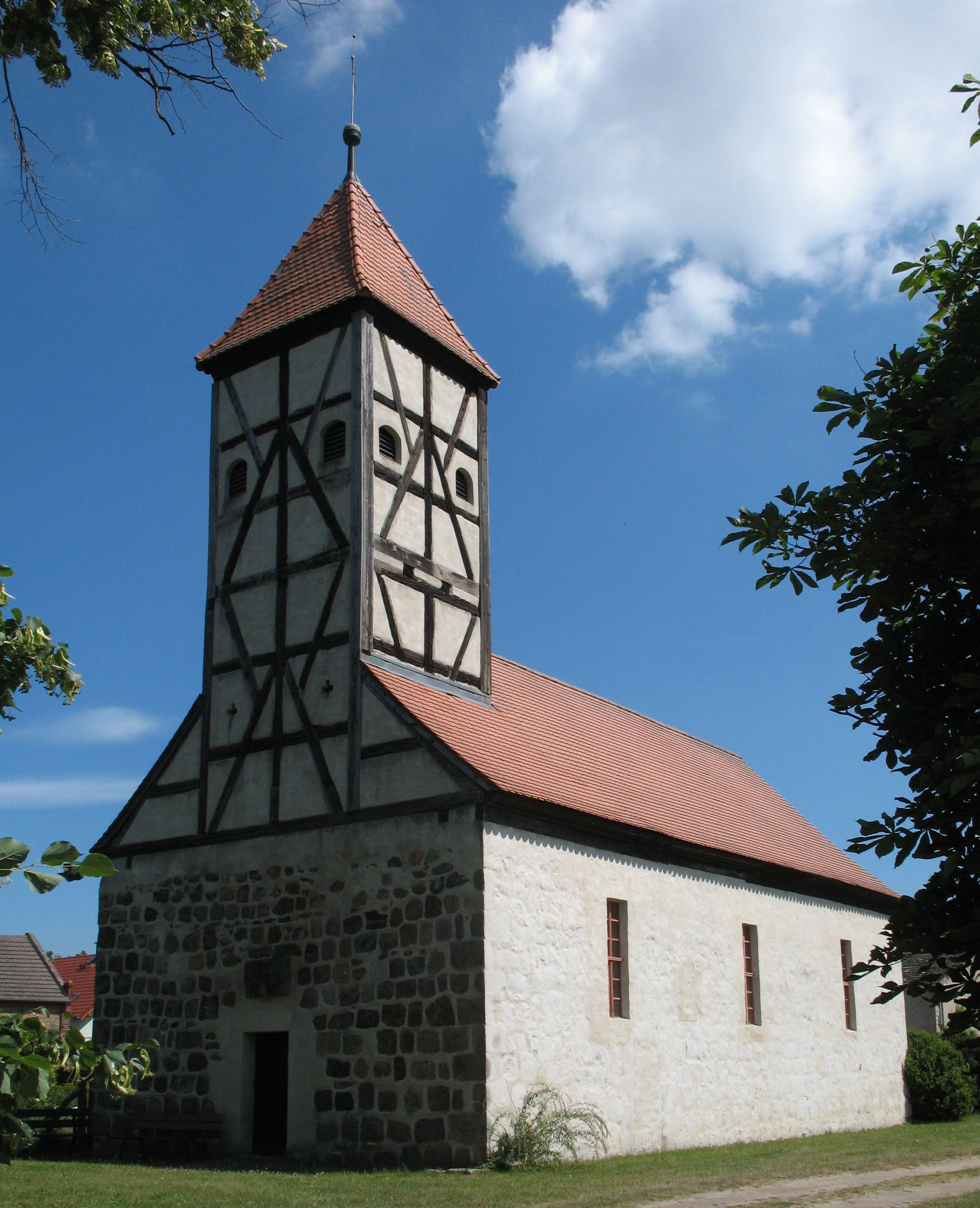
Church in Mahlenzien

== Notable people ==
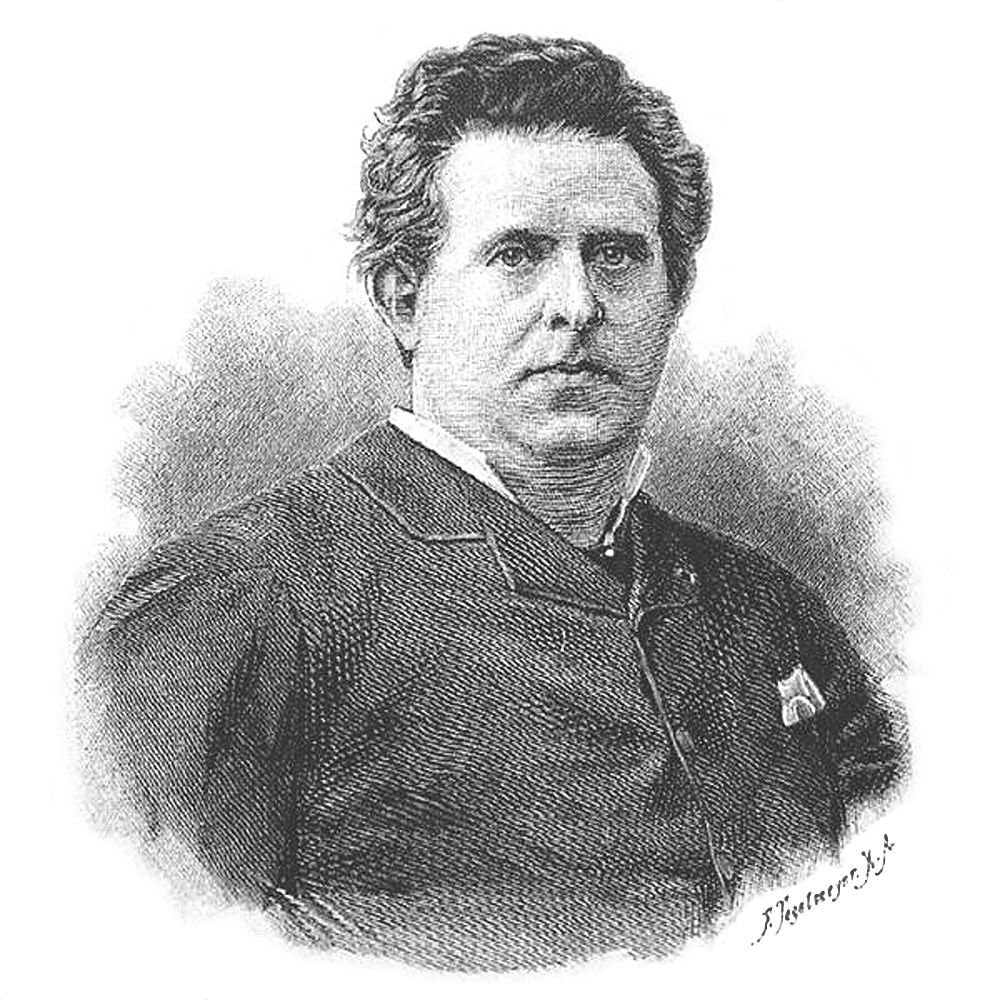
Ludwig Chronegk around 1860

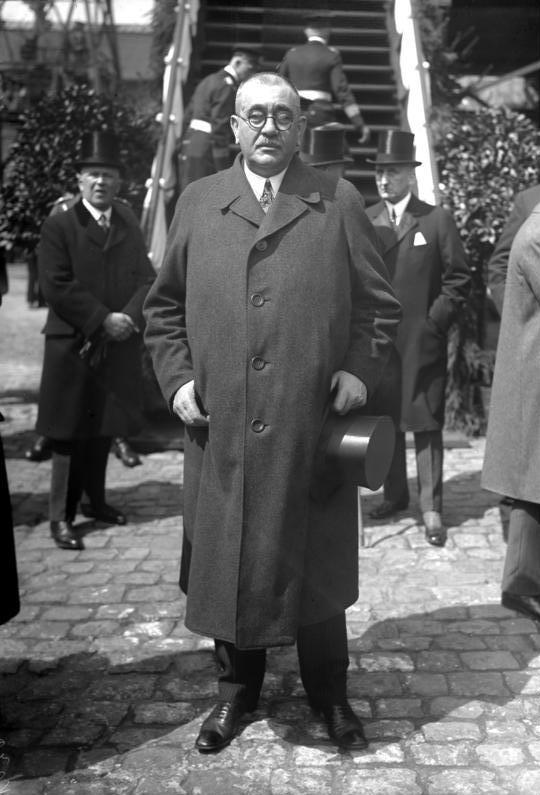
Gustav Noske, 1933

- Judith of Poland (c. 1130/35–1171/75), buried in the cathedral
- Georg Sabinus (Georg Schuler; 1508–1560), academic and rector of the University of Königsberg
- Christian Konrad Sprengel (1750–1816), theologian, botanist and naturalist
- Julius von Voss (1768–1832), officer and writer
- Friedrich de la Motte, Baron Fouqué (1777–1843), writer.
- Wilhelm Eugen Ludwig Ferdinand von Rohr (1782–1851), Prussian general
- Theodor Hosemann (1807–1875), painter, illustrator and cartoonist in Berlin
- Wilhelm Rüstow (1821–1878), freedom fighter and revolutionary, military writer and historian.
- Ludwig Chronegk (1837–1891), actor and director of the Meiningen Court Theatre
- Georg von Waldersee (1860-1932), Imperial German Army general in World War I
- Paul Matschie (1861–1926), zoologist
- Gustav Noske (1868–1946), politician (SPD), Minister of Defence between 1919 and 1920
- Paul Hausser (1880–1972), army general
- Kurt von Schleicher (1882-1934), army general, Chancellor of Germany and Minister of Defence between 1932 and 1933
- Józef Unrug (1884–1973), Polish vice admiral
- Vicco von Bülow (1923–2011), known as Loriot, comedian, film director, actor and writer
- Joachim Kemmer (1939–2000), film actor
- Gerhard Scheu (born 1943), politician
- Angelika Barbe (born 1951), biologist
- Sandra Gockel (born 1974), politician
- Martina Maxi Schmidt (born 1988), politician
- Jacob Schrot (born 1990), civil servant
- Maximilian Beier (born 2002), professional footballer for Borussia Dortmund

== Governance ==
=== Mayor and city council ===
The current mayor is Steffen Scheller of the Christian Democratic Union (CDU) since 2018. The most recent mayoral election was held on 28 February 2018 and the results were as follows:

Candidate	Party	Votes	%
Steffen Scheller	Christian Democratic Union	16,109	66.6
Jan van Lessen	Independent (SPD/Left/Greens)	8,080	33.4
Valid votes		24,189	98.7
Invalid votes		316	1.3
Total		24,505	100.0
Electorate/voter turnout		60,799	40.3
Source: City of Brandenburg

The city council governs the city alongside the mayor. The most recent city council election was held on 9 June 2024, and the results were as follows:

Party	Votes	%	±	Seats	±
Alternative for Germany (AfD)	24,228	23.8	▲9.6	11	▲4
Christian Democratic Union (CDU)	23,990	23.6	▼3.2	11	▼1
Social Democratic Party (SPD)	18,990	18.7	▲1.7	9	▲1
Brandenburg Free Voters (BVB/FW)	9,642	9.5	▼1.3	5	0
Alliance 90/The Greens (Grüne)	9,087	8.9	▼4.9	4	▼2
The Left (Die Linke)	7,318	7.2	▼5.8	3	▼3
Sahra Wagenknecht Alliance (BSW)	5,066	5.0	New	2	New
Free Democratic Party (FDP)	2,863	2.8	▼1.7	1	▼1
Wenzel (Independent)	616	0.6	New	0	New
Valid votes	101,800	100.0		46	±0
Invalid ballots	684	2.0			
Total ballots	34,857	100.0			
Electorate/voter turnout	60,140	58.0	▲9.9		
Source: City of Brandenburg

== Twin towns – sister cities ==
Brandenburg an der Havel is twinned with:

- Ballerup, Denmark
- Ivry-sur-Seine, France
- Kaiserslautern, Germany
- Magnitogorsk, Russia

== See also ==
- Brandenburg Euthanasia Centre
- Brandenburg Gate in Berlin
- Brandenburg Central Station
- BSG Stahl Brandenburg
- Brandenburger SC Süd 05
- Nikolaus von Halem
