= Marne-Land =

Coordinates: 53°57′N 9°00′E

- Former amt
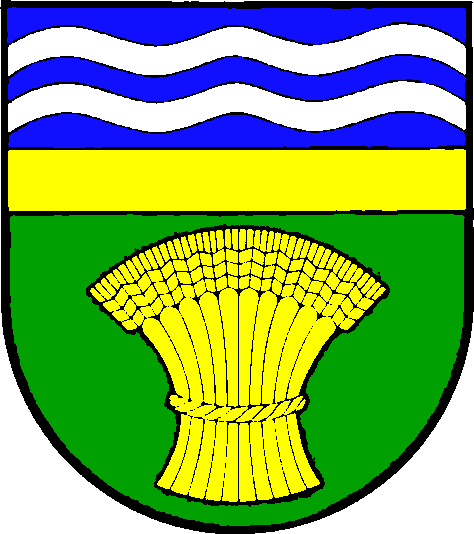
- Coat of arms

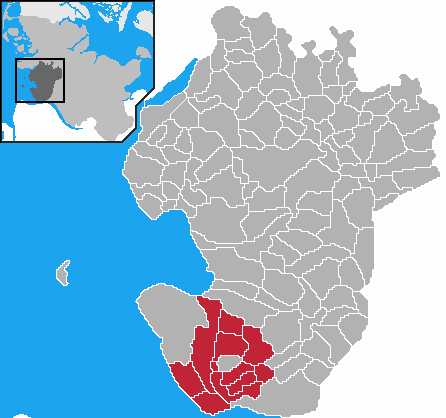
- Map of Dithmarschen highlighting Marne-Land
- Country: Germany
- State: Schleswig-Holstein
- District: Dithmarschen
- Disestablished: 1 January 2008
- Region seat: Marne

Area
  - Total: 120 km^{2} (46 sq mi)

Kirchspielslandgemeinde Marne-Land was an Amt ("collective municipality") in the district of Dithmarschen, in Schleswig-Holstein, Germany. It was situated around Marne, which was the seat of the Amt, but not part of it. In January 2008, it was merged with the town Marne and the municipality Friedrichskoog to form the Amt Marne-Nordsee.

The Amt Kirchspielslandgemeinde Marne-Land consisted of the following municipalities (with population in 2005):

1. Diekhusen-Fahrstedt (734)
2. Helse (964)
3. Kaiser-Wilhelm-Koog (364)
4. Kronprinzenkoog (965)
5. Marnerdeich (341)
6. Neufeld (646)
7. Neufelderkoog (144)
8. Ramhusen (163)
9. Schmedeswurth (215)
10. Trennewurth (269)
11. Volsemenhusen (368)
