= Koog (disambiguation) =

Koog may refer to:

- Koog a form of polder on the coastline of Germany
- Koog aan de Zaan, a town in Holland
- KOOG, a television channel
