= Koog =

Type of polder

A koog (German pronunciation: [koːk]; plural: köge [ˈkøːɡə]) or groden is a type of polder found on the North Sea coast of Germany and Denmark that is established by the construction of dykes enclosing the land which is then drained to form marshland. This type of land reclamation is also used along rivers. In general, a koog is protected by embankments known as dykes (Deiche).

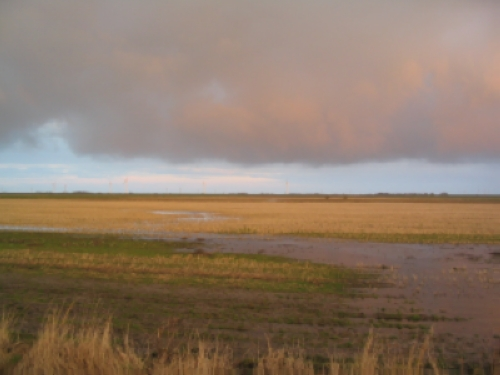
Westerkoog (Dithmarschen): typical koog landscape

== Etymology ==
Unlike the meaning in modern German, Ingvaeonic *kāg, Old Dutch *kōg, modern Dutch koog and West Frisian Dutch kaag all designate "land outside the dike". In the Netherlands, it primarily survives in place names (e.g. De Koog, Koog aan de Zaan, Kaag). From the Dithmarschen word koch (15th and 16th centuries), it went into Danish as kog. In North Frisian it is kuch. The spelling koog was used by the poet Michael Richey in 1755 and around 1700, what is now the port of Cuxhaven was still called Koogshaven.

== Polders ==
In the Netherlands and in the adjacent regions of East Frisia the word polder (Low German: Poller) is used for land enclosed by embankments from where the water is artificially drained. The etymology of the word polder/poller is unclear but it is probably related to English pool.

== Groden ==
The term groden (cf. the English verb "to grow") used in Lower Saxony, particularly in the eastern part of East Frisia and in the Oldenburg Land, refers to new areas of land washed up by the sea. Sediments are deposited by the sea on mud flats when the tides change. After reaching a certain height, the land is dyked. Dyked land becomes innengroden. As a result of draining the fertile soil compacts and, over time, can sink until it is below sea level. The rising sea level in front of the dyke and the sinking of the old, now drained, sea areas behind the dyke leads to further dykes being built at an ever-higher level to enclose the newly dyked areas of marsh. In this way a so-called "polder staircase" is formed.

The name groden is found for example in the borough of Wilhelmshaven in the villages of Altengroden, Neuengroden and Fedderwardergroden, the Heppenser, Voslapper and Rüstersieler Groden, and in the surrounding area are the Cäciliengroden, Petersgroden and Adelheidsgroden. All these areas, whether they emerged more recently (i.e. in the 20th century) or in older times, were formed as a result of dyke enclosure and Aufspülung, as is often the case with polders.

→ See also salt marsh

== Drainage ==
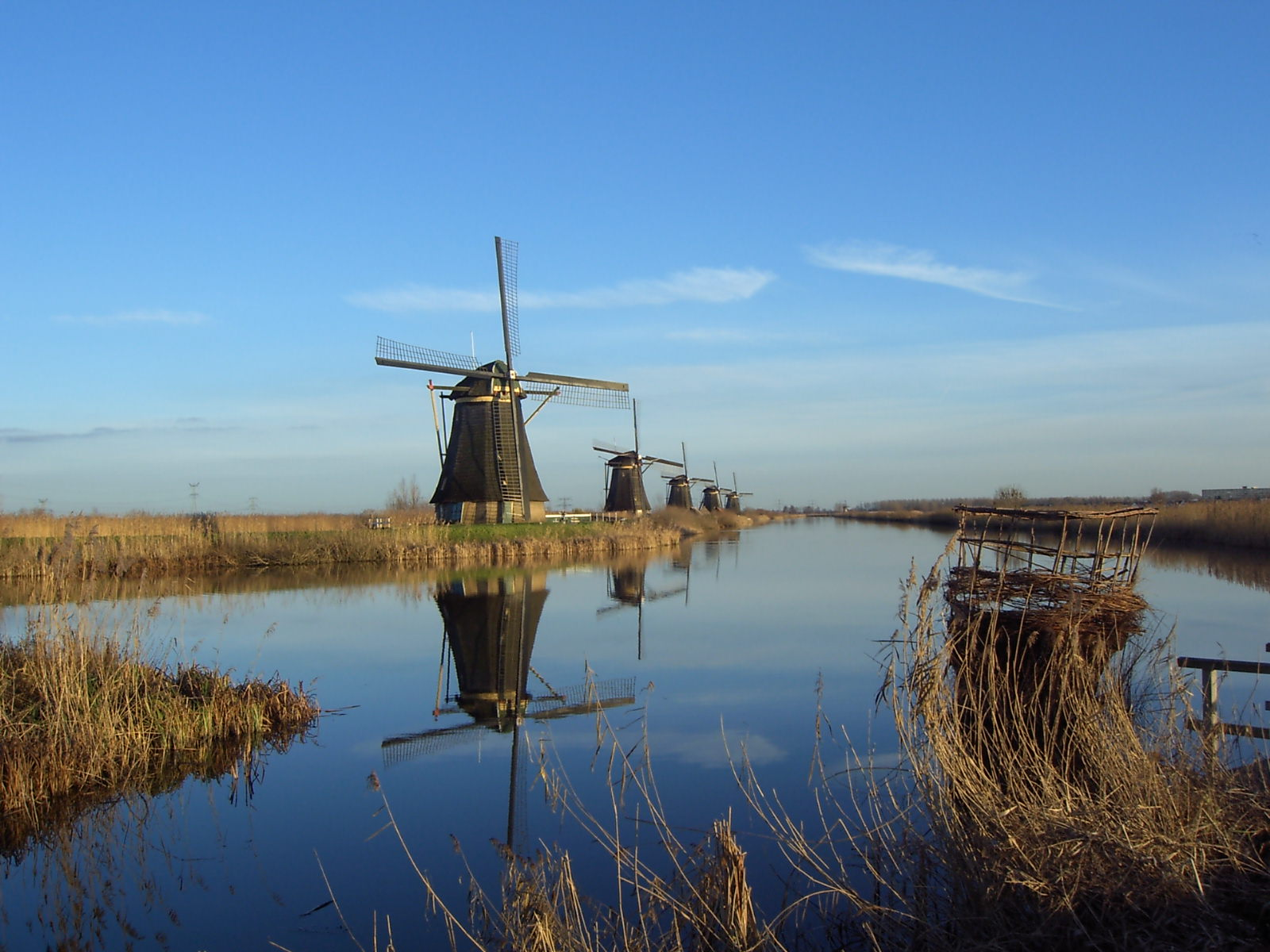
(Pump) mill on a dyke at the Overwaard Polder near Kinderdijk

Because a koog often lies below the level of the adjacent sea or river, it has to be continually drained. This is carried out with the aid of soakaways, sluices, pumping stations and water pumps.

Today the pumps are powered by engines, in pre-industrial times and sometimes even into the period of intense industrialisation, they were driven by wind power (wind pumps). The groups of wind mills on the dykes of the Rhine delta - a symbol of the Netherlands - are old water pumps.

== Riparian köge ==
As well land reclaimed from the sea, a koog may also refer to land reclaimed alongside rivers. These are usually wet areas that are now used for agriculture. This entails creating a completely new ecosystem from a river meadow or a carr. Often its name will recall its original situation, for example, the Oderbruch.

On the Rhine, Elbe and Oder rivers these areas are also used for flood protection. Once the flooding has subsided, water is pumped out again and the land can be used for farming until the next flood.

Until the 1950s, köge were mainly created to reclaim land for farming; since then coastal defence has been the main aim.

== North German köge ==
On the western coast of Schleswig-Holstein and on the shores of the Lower Elbe over 230 koogs have been created over the centuries. The oldest ones are in the borough of Eiderstedt; they date to the 11th century. After the Burchardi flood of 1634, an increasing number of "octroi" koogs were built.
Well known koogs include:

- County of Dithmarschen
  - Christianskoog
  - Delver Koog
  - Dieksanderkoog (formerly Adolf Hitler Koog)
  - Friedrichsgabekoog
  - Friedrichskoog
  - Hedwigenkoog
  - Kaiser-Wilhelm-Koog
  - Karolinenkoog
  - Kronprinzenkoog
  - Neufelderkoog
  - Preiler Koog
  - Speicherkoog in the Bay of Meldorf
  - Wesselburenerkoog
  - Westerkoog
- County of Nordfriesland
  - Augustenkoog
  - Beltringharder Koog
  - Hauke-Haien-Koog (named after the lead character of the novella The Rider on the White Horse by Theodor Storm)
  - Friedrich-Wilhelm-Lübke-Koog – in 1954 the last koog reclaimed for settlement in Schleswig-Holstein.
  - Gotteskoog
  - Tümlauer-Koog (formerly Hermann Göring Koog)
  - Norderheverkoog (formerly Horst Wessel Koog)
  - Bottschlotter Koog (Dagebüll)
  - Kleiseerkoog (Galmsbüll)
  - Herrenkoog
  - Former island of Nordstrand
    - Elisabeth-Sophien-Koog
    - Alter Koog
    - Osterkoog
    - Trendermarschkoog
    - Neukoog
    - Morsumkoog
    - Pohnshalligkoog
  - Municipality of Reußenköge
    - Cecilienkoog
    - Desmerciereskoog
    - Louisen-Reußen-Koog
    - Reußenkoog
    - Sönke-Nissen-Koog
    - Sophien-Magdalenen-Koog
- County of Pinneberg
  - Hetlinger Neuerkoog

== Literature ==
- Harry Kunz, Albert Panten: Die Köge Nordfrieslands. Mit Karte. Nordfriisk Instituut, Bräist/Bredstedt, 1997, ISBN 3-88007-251-5 (Nordfriisk Instituut 144).
