= Hanna Sturm =

Austrian labor rights, peace, and Nazi resistance activist

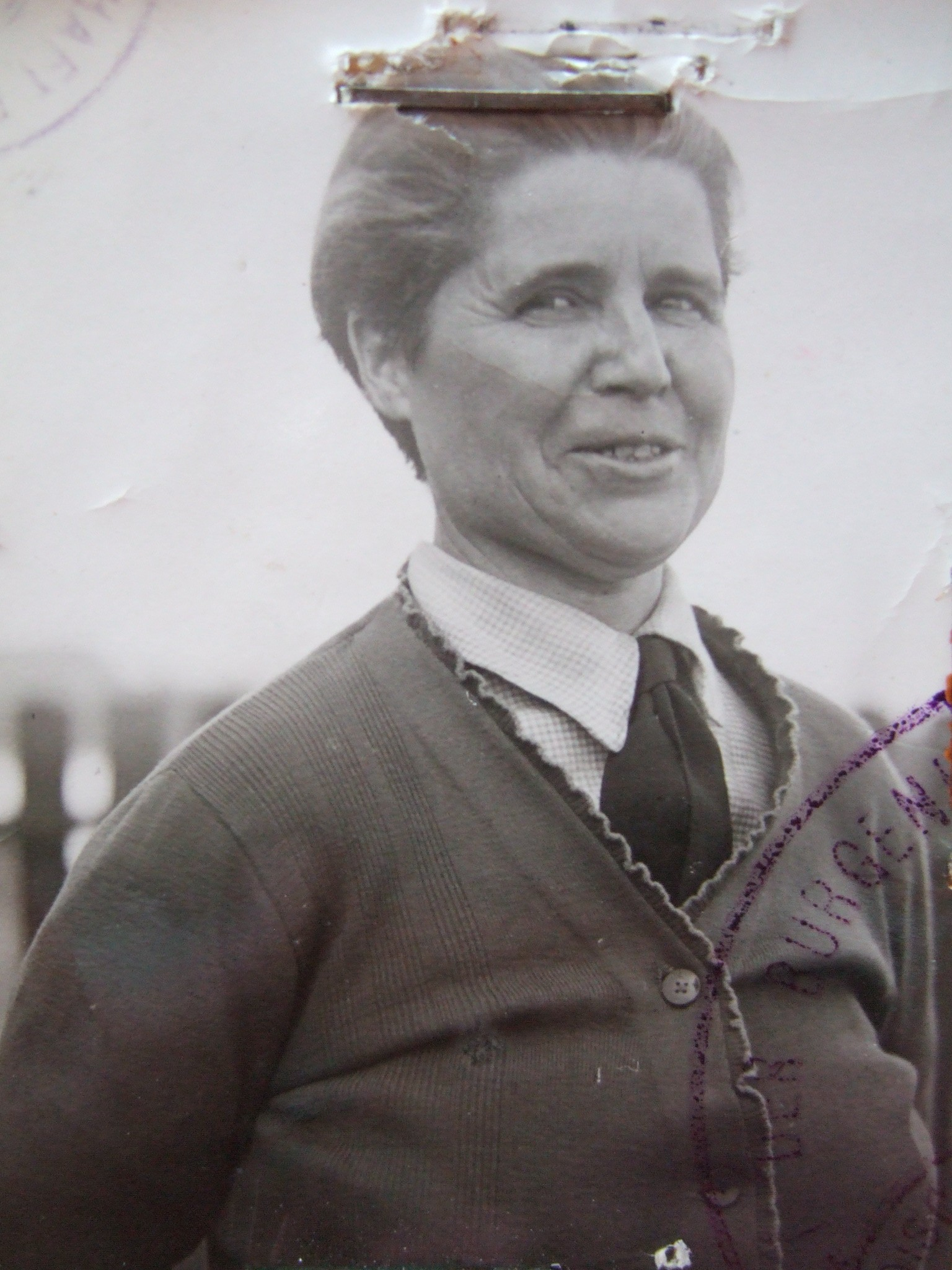
- Sturm in 1951, photo from an official identity document
- Born: Johanna Sturm; 28 February 1891; Klingenbach, Eisenstadt, Austria-Hungary
- Died: 9 March 1984 (aged 93); Zagreb, SR Croatia, SFR Yugoslavia
- Occupations: trades union and political activist peace activist
- Known for: surviving Ravensbrück internment
- Political party: SPÖ; KPÖ; КПСС (CPSU)
- Children: Theresia (1912–); Relli (1915–1919)

Hanna Sturm (28 February 1891 – 9 March 1984) was a labour rights and peace activist who became a resistance activist after Austria was merged into Nazi Germany in 1938. She spent the next few years in German concentration camps, but emerged from Ravensbrück camp on 30 April 1945 having survived. Many did not. She wrote an autobiographical record of her experiences in 1958 but was unable to find a publisher: in 1982, two years before she died, the work was however published.

== Life ==
=== Provenance and early years ===
Johanna Sturm was born at Klingenbach, a small town near Eisenstadt in Burgenland. Burgenland became part of Austria in 1921, but when Hanna Sturm and her siblings were born it was in the Hungarian half of the Austro-Hungarian empire. She was the second of her parents' four children, and the only daughter among them. Her father worked as a carpenter. The family were members of what has come to be known as the Burgenland Croatian minority. She attended school for only two winters, between October and March, and then, there being no universal schooling provision operating in Hungary, started work in the fields when she was eight, later taking work in domestic service. When she was ten her father paid one florin to a notary to confirm that she was twelve: that enabled her to get work at the sugar factory in nearby Schattendorf. After a year she gained a promotion which triggered jealousy on the part of other children working in the factory who filled her empty coffee flask with sugar syrup at the end of the day. The syrup was discovered in a check as she left work and she was dismissed for the presumed theft of it. When she was 14 she took a factory job with "Jute AG" in Neufeld, another small town in the area. With three other similarly aged children she worked on an industrial washing machine used in the processing of the materials. However, following a strike over "wages fraud" she was back on the streets. A few years later, in 1907, she accompanied her elder brother Julius to Vienna in search of factory work.

=== Labour activism in Vienna ===
In Vienna, through her brother, she got to know a Czech family who gave her her first job in the city. The father of the family was a union man: he was able to get her a job at the "Jute AG" factory in Floridsdorf, a growing industrial quarter across the river to the north of the main part of the city. (The factory was a sister plant to the one from which she had been dismissed in Neufeld.) At Floridsdorf she came into contact, for the first time, with the rapidly evolving labour movement. On 15 March 1908 Hanna Sturm joined the Social Democratic Party ("Sozialdemokratische Partei Österreichs" / SPÖ). On 8 March 1910 she joined a trades union: she remained a lifelong member. Encouraged and supported by her Social Democratic landlords, she learned to read and write.

Vienna faced a general strike in 1911. Hanna Sturm took part in a large demonstration along the "Ringstraße" (Ring Boulevard) around the city centre. Police applied "rigour" to their handling of the demonstrating worker. Because she was distributing leaflets, Sturm received a powerful blow to her face, leaving her eyes bloodshot. Participation in the demonstration also led to the loss of her job with "Jute AG", and a further period of unemployment.

=== Motherhood and war ===
As Hanna Sturm recalled many decades later in an interview, working in the munitions factory provided practical opportunities to oppose the war:

- "Inside the factories we had to find ways and means to organise anti-war work. Small groups were formed, while others did what they did as individuals. For example, we placed little leaflets or bits of paper with anti-war messages in the muunitions boxes destined for the frontline. Or we made various items of ordinance harmless."

Hanna Sturm quoted by Hannes Hofbauer and Andrea Komlosy

- "In den Betrieben selbst, in der Arbeit mussten wir Wege und Mittel finden, wie wir die Antikriegsarbeit organisierten. Es sind kleine Gruppen gebildet worden oder es gab Einzelmenschen, die Verschiedenes gemacht haben. Zum Beispiel haben wir kleine Flugblätter und kleine Zettelchen gegen den Krieg in Kisten reingegeben, die für den Krieg gedacht waren. Oder wir haben verschiedene Kriegsmaterialien unschädlich gemacht.."

The birth of her daughter, Theresia, on 7 October 1912 exposed Sturm to the discrimination and additional practical difficulties commonly visited on an unmarried mother. During the First World War she was sent to work in a munitions factory at Blumau (Felixdorf), to the south of Vienna. In August 1916 she was arrested for alleged sabotage and spent a time in investigative custody. She was accused of filling explosives shells with sand rather than explosives. Eventually her case came to trial and was dismissed for lack of evidence. She found another job. Sturm had been sending most of her money to her mother, Anna, who was looking after her two daughters. The father of the girls never came back from the war. She was still separated from her daughters in 1919 when the younger of them, Relli, died in a Vienna hospital. Sturm was deeply affected but carried on. She took part in preparations for the "January strike" of 1918, called to press for improved conditions for the women workers and an end to the war. This led to her further arrest, but this time she was released very soon due to the sparseness of the evidence against her.

=== The 133 day soviet ===
The rapid collapse of the empire in October/November 1918 left Hungary separated from Austria, with present-day Burgenland on the Hungarian side of the impromptu frontier. Identified in her papers as a Burgenland Croat, Sturm now found herself classified as an alien in Vienna: she had to return to the region of her birth. She was a supporter of the Hungarian Soviet proclaimed by Béla Kun on 21 March 1919. Characteristically, her support was practical. She worked as a courier, delivering to pre-assigned locations significant consignments of cash that had been collected for the Hungarian Red Army. On one occasion she was spotted by the police, arrested and taken to Zalaegerszeg. After three days she managed to escape, but at the new frontier-crossing at Neufeld she was recognised by the frontier guards and re-arrested. She was "imprisoned" in the second class waiting room at the station. She managed to climb out of a window without being spotted and ran across the fields to Ebenfurth which was "still in Austria".

The Hungarian Soviet collapsed in the face of foreign military interventions at the beginning of August 1919 and Sturm turned to organising illegal border crossing for the leaders as they fled. One of those she helped was Béla Kun, who had led the short-lived soviet. She hid him in her apartment for three days without recognising him, but as he left he disclosed his identity.

=== Years between two wars ===
In August the region comprising modern Burgenland was removed from Hungary and transferred to Austria, both countries being by this point internationally recognised as separate independent states. Sturm could finally return home to Neufeld without difficulties. She found work in the town's jute factory, soon becoming a member of the work's council. Sturm remained politically engaged in the post war years. She took particular trouble in respect of Catholic Croatian female co-workers whom the employers repeatedly used as "strike breakers". As one source expresses it, Hanna Sturm succeeded in bringing the women workers involved round to solidarity based on a class-conscious way of thinking.

In 1924 she travelled to Moscow as an Austrian delegate to an international Comintern conference. She was able to meet high-profile political activists from various countries: comrades with whom she shared a table at the conference included Sun Yat-sen and his young wife with whom, as she later reported, she was able to discuss in German a range of topics that went beyond politics. There was also a reunion with Béla Kun who "recognised her immediately". Back home there had been two big strikes by the women workers in pursuit of wage demands in 1925, after which, on getting home from Moscow, Sturm was unable to find work. In the immediate term she started organising unemployed workers in the area, becoming chair of the Unemployed Committee in Eisenstadt, the capital of Burgenland, although personally, with only very limited financial support, she was under pressure. She also found herself in conflict with the SPÖ party leadership. The party chairman, Otto Bauer, went on record with the punning observation "Wir lassen uns die Sturm nicht über den Kopf wachsen" (loosely "We should not let this storm overwhelm us.").

In 1925 (or, possibly 1927 – sources differ), in the context of continuing differences with the party leadership, Sturm was excluded from the Social Democratic Party. This development she took as an opportunity to join the Austrian Communist Party. Still unable to find work in her home region, where her political activities seem to have become common knowledge among factory owners, in 1929 Hanna Sturm moved with her adolsescent daughter Theresia to Bremen in Germany where the two of them found work in a textiles factory. The period was one of growing political polarisation in Germany: in that year's works council elections at the factory where they worked 12 out of 15 of the workers elected to the works council were communists, a result to which Hanna Sturm's "politicisation" of her comrades may well have contributed. Soon after that mother and daughter were expelled from Germany.

Back in Burgenland a further period of unemployment followed. In 1930 the labour exchange sent Hanna and Theresia Sturm, together with a group of unemployed miners, to Moscow. Half a year later they were both employed, not in Moscow but as instructors at the "Rabotnica" textiles factory in Leningrad, training apprentices and other young recruits over three shifts how to work the spinning machines.

=== Back to Austria: but Hanna's daughter Theresia stayed in the Soviet Union till 1957 ===
In Autumn 1932 the party recalled Hanna Sturm to Austria. Theresia stayed behind, studying Applied Economics ("Volkswirtschaft") at Leningrad University. She also had an office job with the international sailors' club which is how she met her first husband, a German sailor whom she married in 1932. Subsequently, her husband was arrested, Theresia herself being arrested a year after that, probably in both cases because they refused to apply for Soviet citizenship. Theresia spent more than twenty years in internal exile in the Ukhta area of the Komi People's Republic. She nevertheless survived, and in 1957 was able to move with her Yugoslav born husband and her four children to Zagreb, where they built a new life.

A Fascist government took power in Austria in 1934 and, encouraged by developments in Germany the previous year, rapidly transformed the country into a post-democratic dictatorship. Sources are for the most part silent about political activities undertaken by Hanna Sturm during the rest of the 1930s. It is recorded that she was detained by the authorities on four occasions between 1933 and 1937 for terms of between four and twenty-four days. At some stage she was excluded from the Austrian Communist Party, though it is not clear whether this was before or after the party was banned. She remained, in any case, a member of the Soviet Communist Party.

=== Ravensbrück ===
"She really was a universal talent. She succeeded with every job she tackled, which is why she was permitted far more leeway than other prisoners. She was so full of ideas and creative improvisations. So we were all able to learn a lot in the Sturm column. Even the para-military camp guards came to her for advice. She had their respect."

Hermine Jursa, a member of the "Sturm column" which undertook a plethora of repair work in the concentration camp under the direction of fellow inmate, the committed communist Hanna Sturm

"Sie war ja ein Universaltalent. Was sie angegriffen hat, ist ihr gelungen, deswegen hat sie sich auch viel erlauben können, mehr als die anderen Häftlinge. So viele Ideen hat sie gehabt und so vieles konnte sie entwickeln. Deswegen hat man bei der Sturm-Kolonne viel lernen können. Sogar die SS ist gekommen und hat sich Rat von ihr geholt. Sie haben Respekt vor ihr gehabt."

Austria was merged into Nazi Germany in March 1938 and the repression of known anti-Nazis became more systematic. That same month Sturm was arrested again, this time by the Gestapo. By June 1938 she had been taken to Lichtenburg concentration camp in central Germany, between Leipzig and Berlin. She fell ill but recovered, setting up a small team of "fixers" – the so-called "Sturm column", who made themselves useful by mending broken fixtures in the camp, thereby winning a level of respect from the para-military guards who would let the "Sturm column" into their own parts of the camp in order to effect repairs and, at the same time, steal food. Slightly less than a year later, in May 1939, the concentration camp at Lichtenburg was closed and the women inmates were transferred to Ravensbrück concentration camp, to the north of Berlin. Glimpses afforded by sources suggest Sturm was not broken by the system. There is a reference to her as "the Austrian communist and jack-of-all-trades [who would] teach "students": how to put up fences, bang in nails, and break up locks", and later, slightly unexpectedly, of how she would "hold discussions on Leo Tolstoy's War and Peace...in the back of block 13. ... Students [might] find the book highly repellent since Hanna [had] found the book in the latrine." At Ravensbrück she also continued to operate her "Sturm column" of hands-on fixers and menders. She came to be regarded by the camp authorities as a "reliable prisoner" and was employed in 1941 as a domestic servant by Walter Sonntag, the concentration camp doctor. She would later recall how she had been present while Sonntag beat his wife, too drunk to notice or to care that Sturm was standing by.

=== The survivor ===
"Do you know what they said to me? If it was that bad in the concentration camp where reportedly you were, then you should not have stayed there. How come you stayed? And then one of them said I could have married in Germany. They did not want to hear. I still dream of the camp. I curse the camp. I'm back there almost every day. Actually right now this camp is haunting me. I sleep badly, and if I drop off for five minutes, I'm immediately somewhere back in the camp."

Hanna Sturm

"Weißt, was sie mir gesagt haben? Wenn es so schlecht war im KZ, wo du angeblich warst, dann wärst du nicht übergeblieben. Wieso bist du übergeblieben! Und dann hat mir einer gesagt, du kannst ja auch in Deutschland verheiratet gewesen sein. Sie haben nicht hören wollen. Dabei träum ich heute noch vom Lager. Ich verfluch das Lager. Fast jeden Tag bin ich dort. Überhaupt jetzt, dieser Tage geistert das Lager hinter mir her. Ich kann schlecht schlafen, und wenn ich fünf Minuten einschlaf‘, bin ich schon irgendwo im Lager."

As the war ended, on 30 April 1945 Hanna Sturm emerged badly traumatised from the concentration camp. It would be more than another ten years before her surviving daughter and four grand children would be released from the Soviet Union and the immediate priority was simple survival. She returned to Burgenland. There was no victims' welfare for concentration camp survivors till 1948, and in the early postwar years she suffered material hardship, while as a member of an inconvenient ethnic minority, the Burgenland Croats, she remained something of an outsider as the new Austria, still under foreign military occupation, struggled to emerge from its painful recent history. The concentration camp existence lived on in her dreams.

But she did not give up. She testified several times at trials of former Ravensbrück camp guards. In Neufeld, her home town, she built a house with her own hands. She had prepared her autobiography by 1958, but it would take another 24 years before she found a publisher for it.

In 1984 Hanna Sturm died at her daughter's family home in Zagreb.
