= Bay of Meldorf =

Bay in Germany

Coordinates: 54.084°N 8.886°E

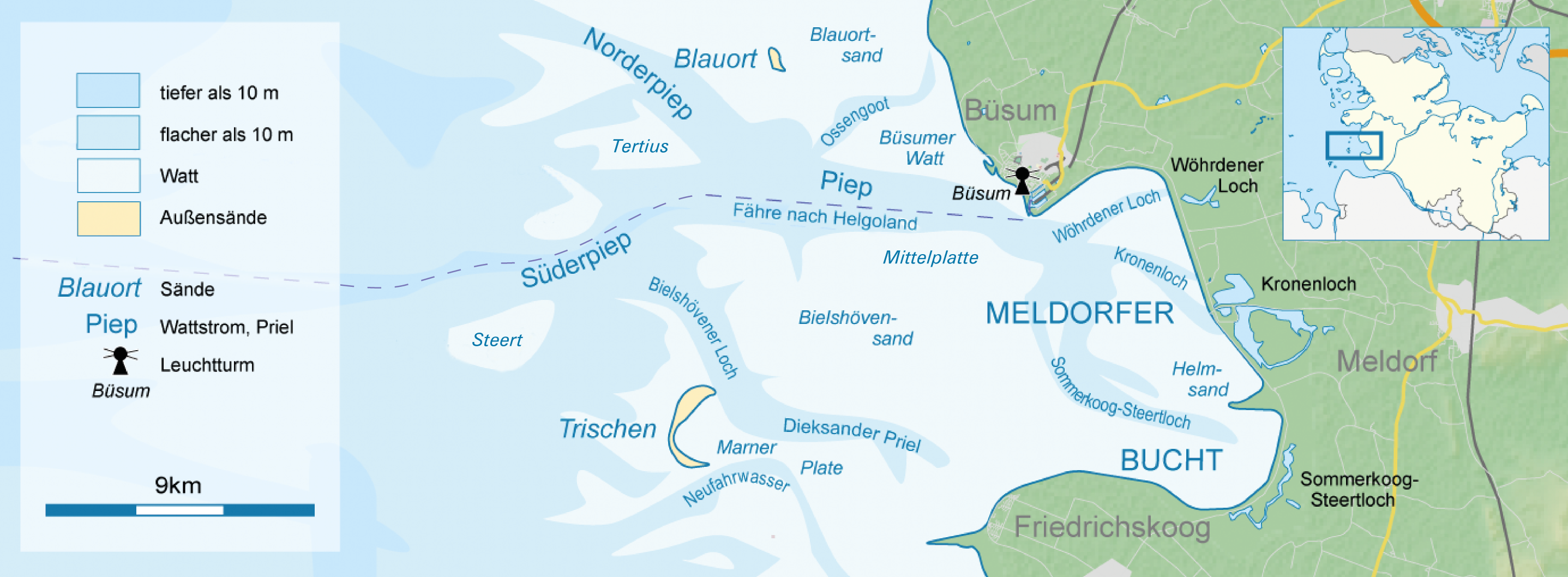
Bay of Meldorf

The Bay of Meldorf also called Meldorf Bay (German: Meldorfer Bucht), is a bay on the coast of the North German state of Schleswig-Holstein, which forms part of the Heligoland Bight.

== Location ==
The bay lies about 90 km (as the crow flies) northwest of Hamburg and 30 km north-northeast of Cuxhaven. It falls within the district of Dithmarschen. To the north is the North Sea resort of Büsum, to the south the seaside resort of Friedrichskoog, which does not however border directly onto Meldorf Bay. To the east is the village of Hemmingstedt and the town of Meldorf, which gives the bay its name. To the west the bay opens out into the North Sea. Its most important channel is the Piep, which is up to 20 metres deep and divides in Meldorf Bay into three branches: the Wöhrdener Loch (north), the Kronenloch and the Sommerkoog-Steertloch (south).

== History ==
As a result of several major storm floods in the late Middle Ages and early modern times, the bay expanded further and further into the low marshes and almost reached the town of Meldorf, sited on a geest ridge. Not until the 16th century was land reclaimed and the polders (Köge) within the bay dyked for the first time.

On 17 February 1500 the independent peasant republic of Dithmarschen fought the army of the King of Denmark and his brother at the Battle of Hemmingstedt. The king's cavalry, largely composed of nobles, was almost entirely drowned in the waters of the spring tide in Meldorf Bay.

== Today ==
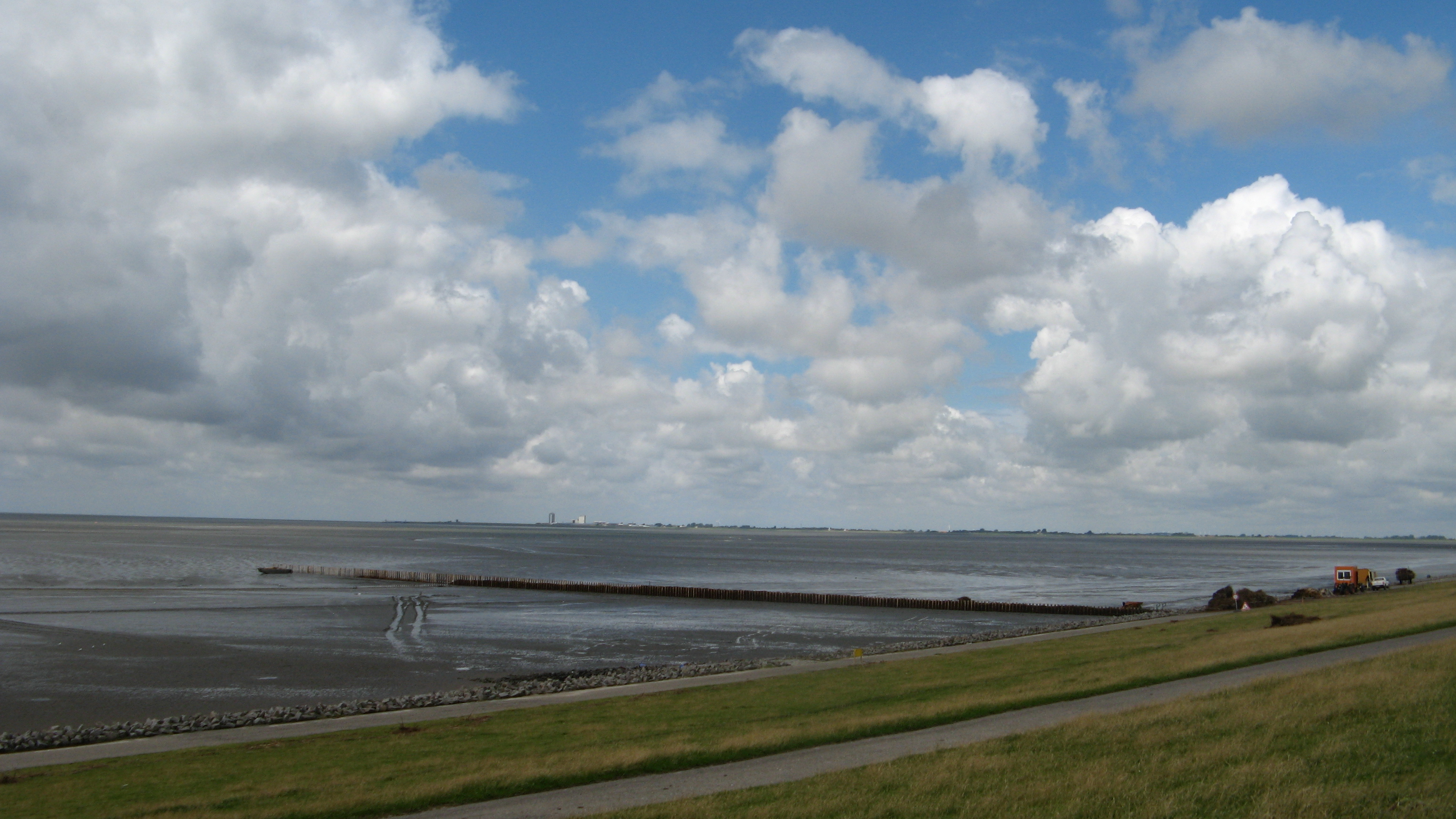
View over the northern part of Meldorf Bay from Speicherkoog Harbour looking towards Büsum

When the last dykes were built from April 1969 to March 1978, taking in an area of about 8.5 x 8 kilometres, Meldorf Bay was left with an (estimated) area of 30 km². The construction of the latest dykes was not, however, primarily aimed at land reclamation but coastal defence. For example, by building new, 8.8 metre high dykes that were only 14.8 km long (in the core area of the bay), the crest of the dyke was raised significantly and the length of the dyke greatly shortened. The newly created Speicherkoog on Meldorf Bay is designed primarily to store water from the interior during inland flooding and to discharge it into the sea through two dyke sluices and scoop wheels. In addition, the salt marshes act as a protected sanctuary for birds. Agriculture only plays a minor role in Speicherkoog. Sheep are grazed here to help to stabilize the dykes. Both the Speicherkoog as well as the other undyked areas of Meldorf Bay belong to protection zone 1 of the Schleswig-Holstein Wadden Sea National Park and are therefore subject to special conservation laws.

== Islands ==
In Meldorf Bay lies the uninhabited island of Helmsand, which is like one of the Halligen and many years ago was linked to the mainland by a causeway. It is also a bird reserve like the island of Trischen, which lies off the bay. Even the sandbanks of Blauort and Tertius may only be visited with special permission.

== Human use ==
The immediate coastal areas are fully developed for tourism. The Norderpiep and Süderpiep channels provide access to the port of Büsum. The shrimp cutters stationed there fish Meldorf Bay as well as other areas. The southern part of the bay is used by the Bundeswehr as a weapons testing area. In the western part, just north of the Elbe estuary and the Vogelsand is a burial site for those buried at sea.

== Literature ==
- Michelsen, Hans (2008). Die Abdeichung der Meldorfer Bucht. In: Dithmarschen - Landeskunde - Kultur - Natur, Heft 3/2008, pp. 24−43; Verein für Dithmarscher Landeskunde (Hrsg.), Heide
