= Claus Harms =

German clergyman and theologian

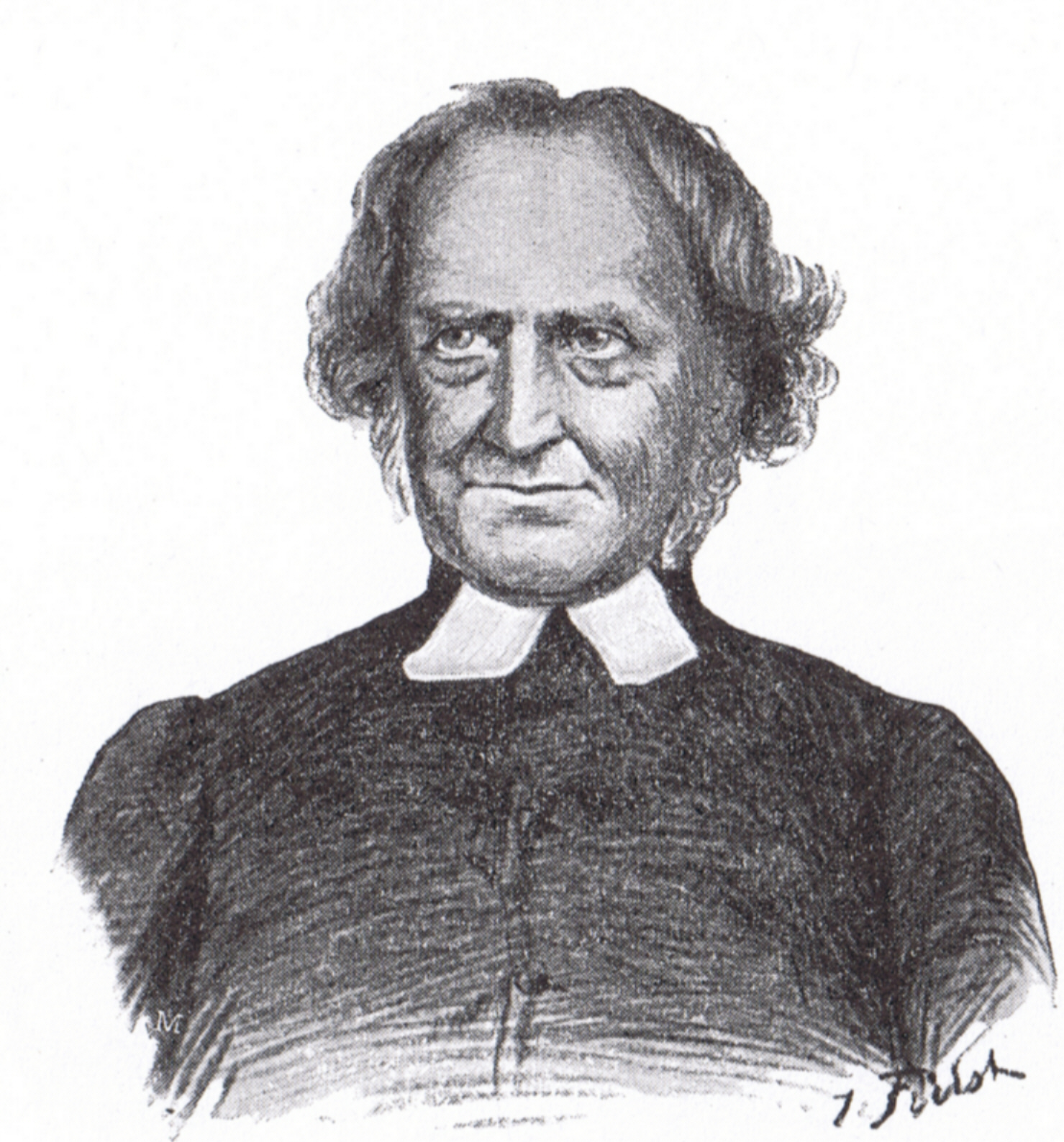
- Born: 25 May 1778; Fahrstedt, Schleswig
- Died: 1 February 1855 (aged 76); Kiel, Holstein
- Occupations: clergyman and theologian

Claus Harms (25 May 1778 – 1 February 1855) was a German clergyman and theologian.

== Life ==
Harms was born at Fahrstedt in Schleswig, and in his youth worked in his father's mill. At the University of Kiel he repudiated the prevailing rationalism and under the influence of Schleiermacher became a fervent Evangelical preacher, first at Lunden (1806), and then at Kiel (1816).

Harms's trenchant style made him very popular, and he did great service for his cause especially in 1817, when, on the 300th anniversary of the Reformation, he published side by side with Luther's theses, ninety-five of his own, attacking reason as "the pope of our time" who "dismisses Christ from the altar and throws God's word from the pulpit."

As a musician, Harms sought to restore Lutheran hymns back to their original state. To this end, he researched the original texts from people such as Luther, Gerhardt, and others, hoping to find the original texts for the hymns his people were singing. In this he was mostly successful - the textual reforms he made still remain in hymnals today. He was unsuccessful, though, in restoring the tunes to their original states. The Renaissance-style tunes employed by the early Reformers had largely been smoothed out, such that the lively syncopations common to music of that era had been replaced by simple meters. His attempts met with early resistance, and he abandoned the project.

Besides volumes of sermons Harms published a good book on Pastoraltheologie (1830). He resigned his pastorate on account of blindness in 1849 and died on 1 February 1855.

== Quotations ==
The Evangelical Catholic is a glorious Church; it holds and conforms itself chiefly to the Sacraments. The Evangelical Reformed is a glorious Church; it holds and conforms itself chiefly to the Word of God. More glorious than both is the Evangelical Lutheran Church; it holds and conforms itself both to the Sacraments and the Word of God. Into this Lutheran Church both the others are developing, even without the intentional aid of men. But the way of the ungodly shall perish, says David (Ps. 1:6). (the conclusion of Claus Harms' 95 Theses)
