= Eider-Treene Depression =

Landscape in west Schleswig-Holstein in North Germany

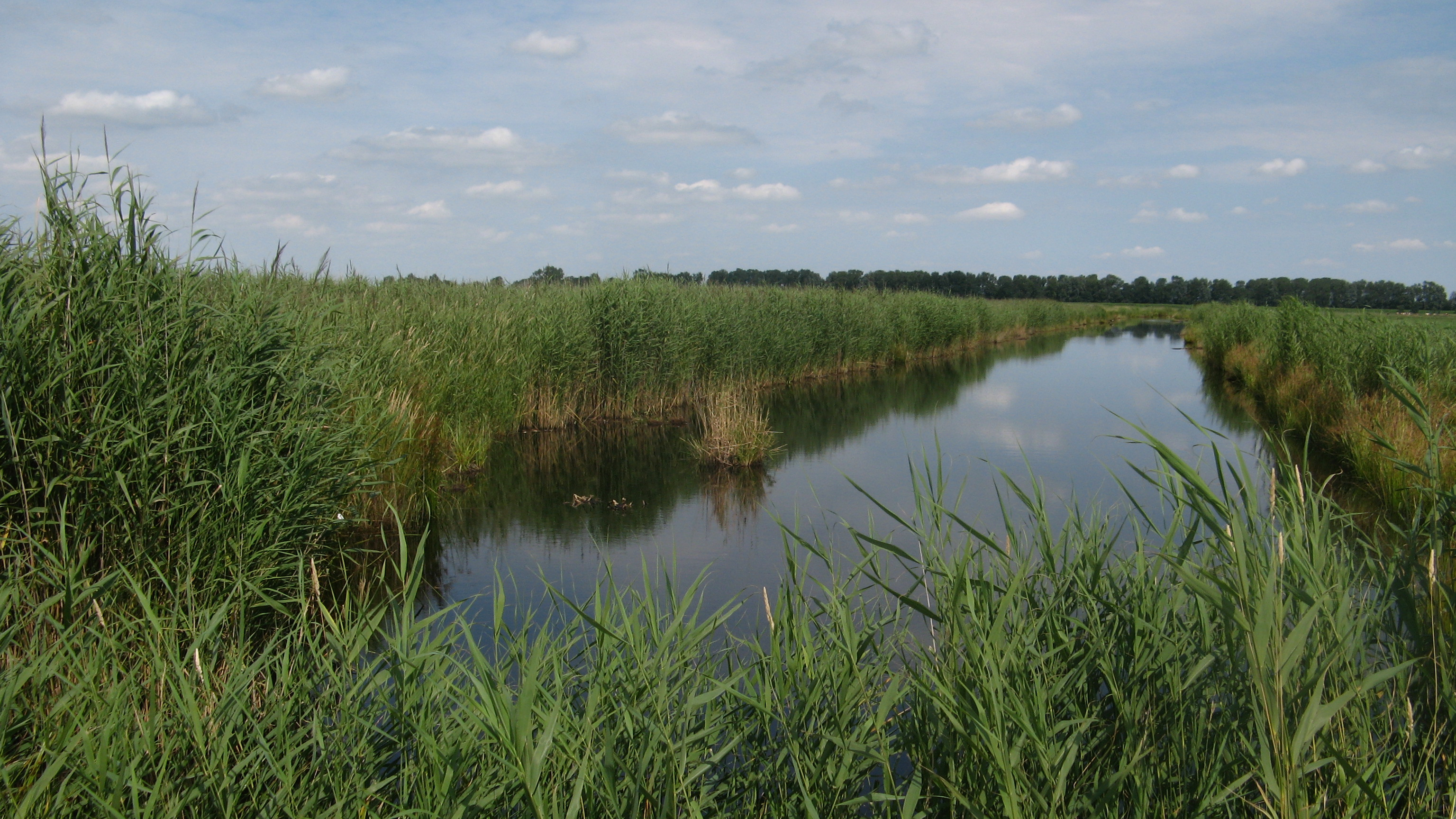
Delver Koog nature reserve in bend of the river Eider

The Eider-Treene Depression (German: Eider-Treene-Niederung; Danish: Ejder-Trene-Sænkningen) is a landscape in west Schleswig-Holstein in North Germany. It covers 500 square kilometres (190 sq mi) around the rivers Eider, Treene and Sorge. The Eider-Treene Depression is the largest wetland in the German state of Schleswig-Holstein. It includes one third of the moorland (bog) in the state and is a habitat to the largest inland group of meadow birds. To the north, its border runs between Hollingstedt and Treia, to the east near Rendsburg, to the south the boggy depression reaches to the Hanerau and Haalerau beyond the Kiel Canal. Its western boundary with the Eiderstedt Marsh is unclear as marsh, bog and geest are interspersed. The region comprises the river valleys and their interfluvial geest ridges (Geestkernen). The landscape was formed during the ice ages, and altered by man as a result of dams and weirs built across the Eider, which was still a tidal river as far as Rendsburg until the 1920s. The region recently is encouraging "nature tourism" with walking, riding, cycling and canoe trips.

== Sources ==
- Martin Becker, Gert Kaster: Kulturlandschaft Eider-Treene-Sorge. Wachholtz Verlag, Neumünster 2005
