= Tümlau Bay =

Coordinates: 54°22′N 8°40′E

Tümlau Bay (German: Tümlauer Bucht) is a bay on the west coast of the Eiderstedt peninsula in Germany. It is the last large bay on the North Frisian coast that has not been fully dyked off. The southern part of the bay lies in the municipality of Tümlauer-Koog; the northern shore is part of Westerhever. A prominent landmark on the bay is the Westerheversand Lighthouse.

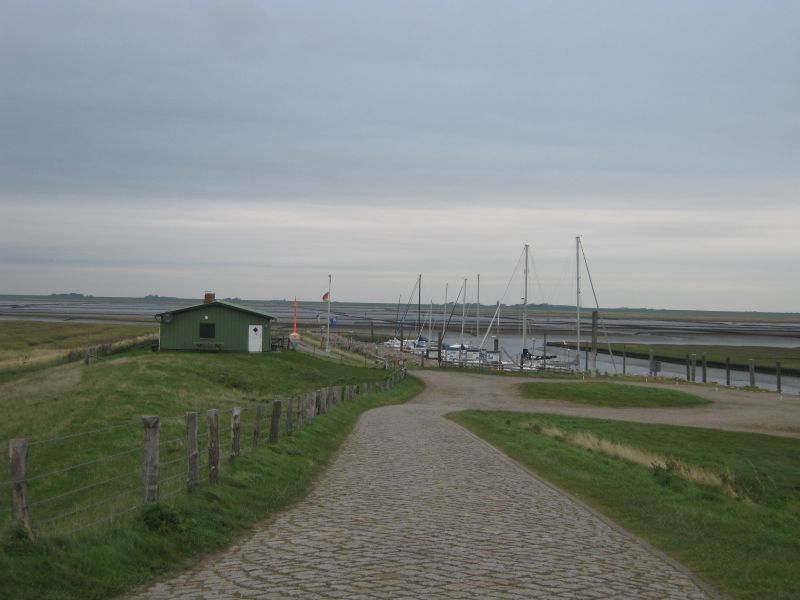
Harbour at Tümlauer Koog

On the dyke around Tümlau Bay runs a cycle path which is signposted Exkurs Westerhever Leuchtturm ("Westerhever Lighthouse Excursion"). It is part of the North Sea Cycle Route (Nordseeküsten-Radweg).

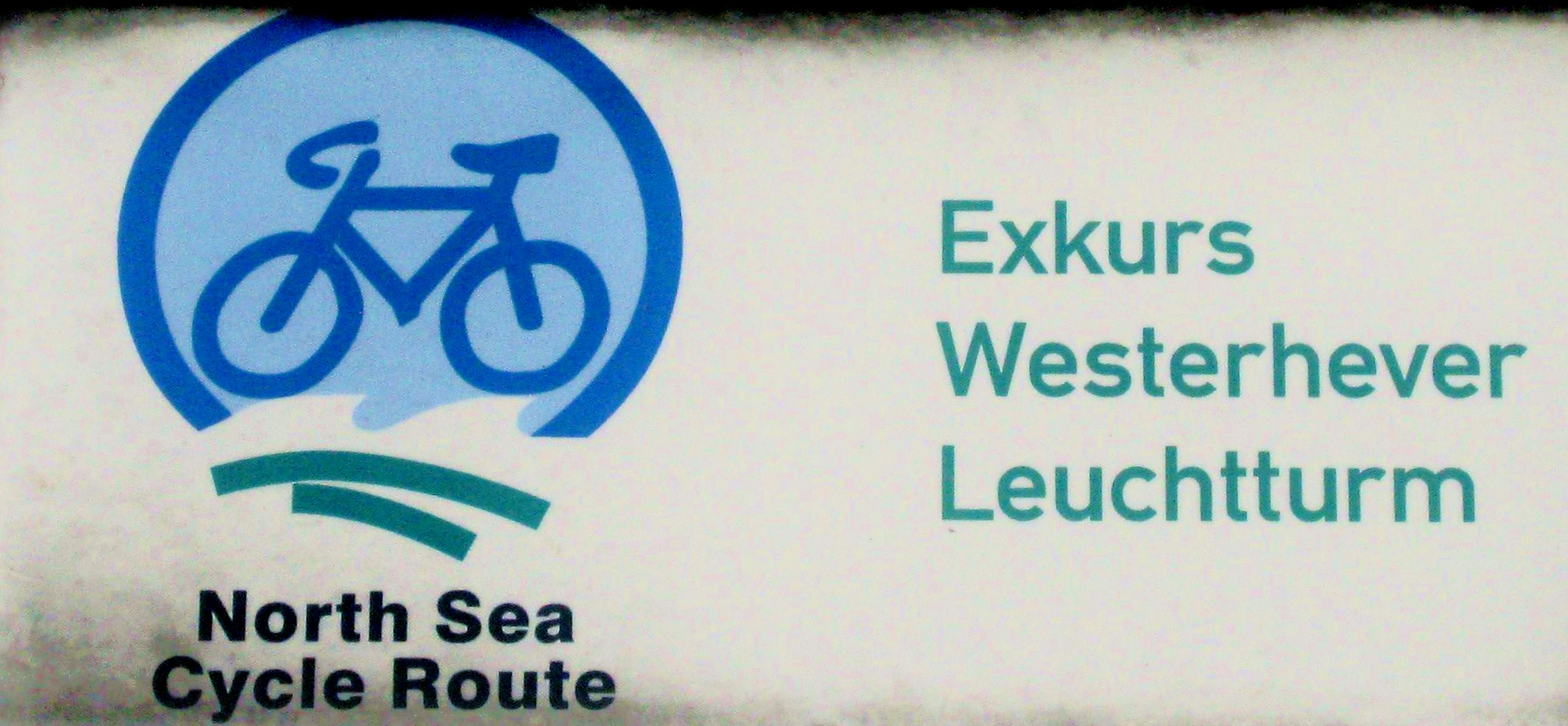
Cycleway sign
