= Neufelderkoog =

- Municipality
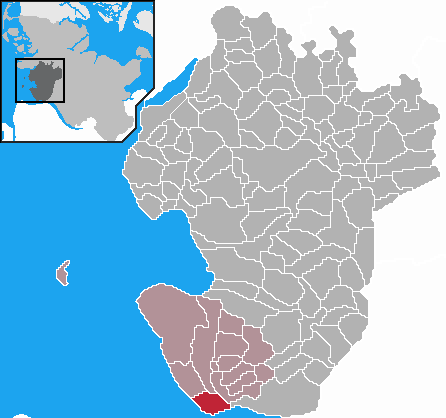
- Location of Neufelderkoog within Dithmarschen district
- Interactive map of Neufelderkoog
- Location within Germany Location within Schleswig-Holstein
- Coordinates: 53°53′N 8°58′E
- Country: Germany
- State: Schleswig-Holstein
- District: Dithmarschen
- Municipal assoc.: Marne-Nordsee

Government
  - Mayor: Heiko Haack

Area
  - Total: 9.77 km^{2} (3.77 sq mi)
- Elevation: 0 m (0 ft)

Population (2025-12-31)
  - Total: 103
  - Density: 10.5/km^{2} (27.3/sq mi)
- Time zone: UTC+01:00 (CET)
  - Summer (DST): UTC+02:00 (CEST)
- Postal codes: 25724
- Dialling codes: 04851, 04856
- Vehicle registration: HEI
- Website: www.amt-marne-nordsee.de

Neufelderkoog (German pronunciation: [ˈnɔʏfɛldɐˌkoːk], lit. 'Neufeld koog') is a municipality in the district of Dithmarschen, in Schleswig-Holstein, Germany.
