= Marnerdeich =

- Municipality
- Coat of arms

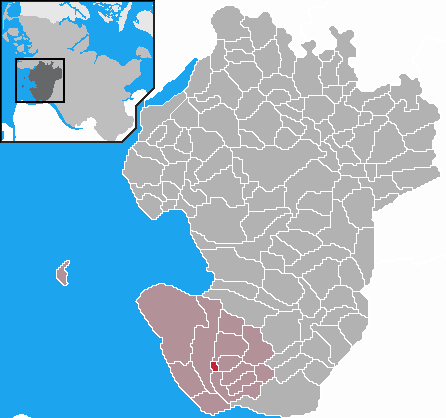
- Location of Marnerdeich within Dithmarschen district
- Interactive map of Marnerdeich
- Location within Germany Location within Schleswig-Holstein
- Coordinates: 53°57′N 8°58′E
- Country: Germany
- State: Schleswig-Holstein
- District: Dithmarschen
- Municipal assoc.: Marne-Nordsee

Government
  - Mayor: Peter Oertel

Area
  - Total: 1.31 km^{2} (0.51 sq mi)
- Elevation: 0 m (0 ft)

Population (2025-12-31)
  - Total: 389
  - Density: 297/km^{2} (769/sq mi)
- Time zone: UTC+01:00 (CET)
  - Summer (DST): UTC+02:00 (CEST)
- Postal codes: 25709
- Dialling codes: 04851
- Vehicle registration: HEI
- Website: www.amt-marne-nordsee.de

Marnerdeich (German pronunciation: [ˈmaʁnɐdaɪç], lit. 'Marne Dike') is a municipality in the district of Dithmarschen, in Schleswig-Holstein, Germany.

== Geography ==
Marnerdeich has the character of a Reihendorfes on both sides of the East–West trending State Road 142 and located on the east side of the North–South municipal road.

== History ==
In the Marsh this country was dyked from 1578 to 1581, as part of the "great Kooges Ammerwurth-Marne". As a separate municipality, it was formed in 1840, after the area legally from the adjacent town of Marne has been separated.

== Politics ==
Of the nine seats on the Municipal Council, the Democratic Union KWV have seven seats since the municipal elections of 2008 and the SPD two.

== Coat of arms ==
Blazon: "split by a green stake. Front in silver six blue wavy; rear of gold, sprinkled with red triangles.

The placename has the municipality with its double meaning on the Genesis. Marnerdeich the called Marne to the protection of the parishes probably at the beginning of the 17th century constructed Dyke. In the course of time, the name was transferred to the new settlement, formed behind the dam. The village of "Marnerdiek" is mentioned for the first time in 1664. The stake in the coat of arms symbolizes the dike with his planting. The red triangles, interpreted as houses, to introduce the parish of Marne, refer also to the settlement of Marnerdeich. At the same time the stylized houses as well as the stake play figuratively the place names. The Golden Shield color in the left half of the coat of arms shows the Cornfields behind the dike, the shaft threads in a silver field represent the sea, the Bare Hans.
