= Delver Koog =

Coordinates: 54°20′03″N 9°14′52″E

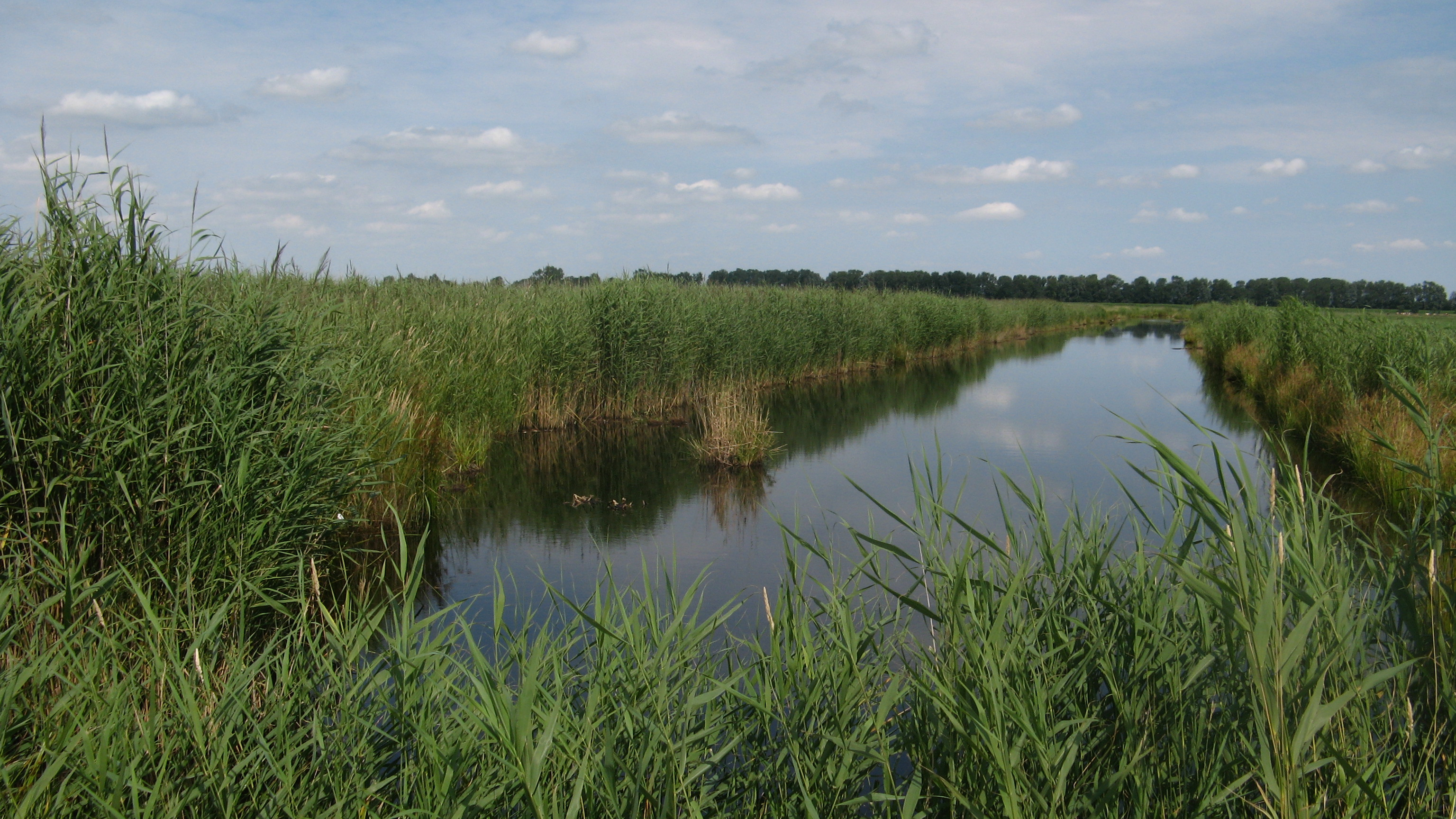
Boundary of the Delver Koog

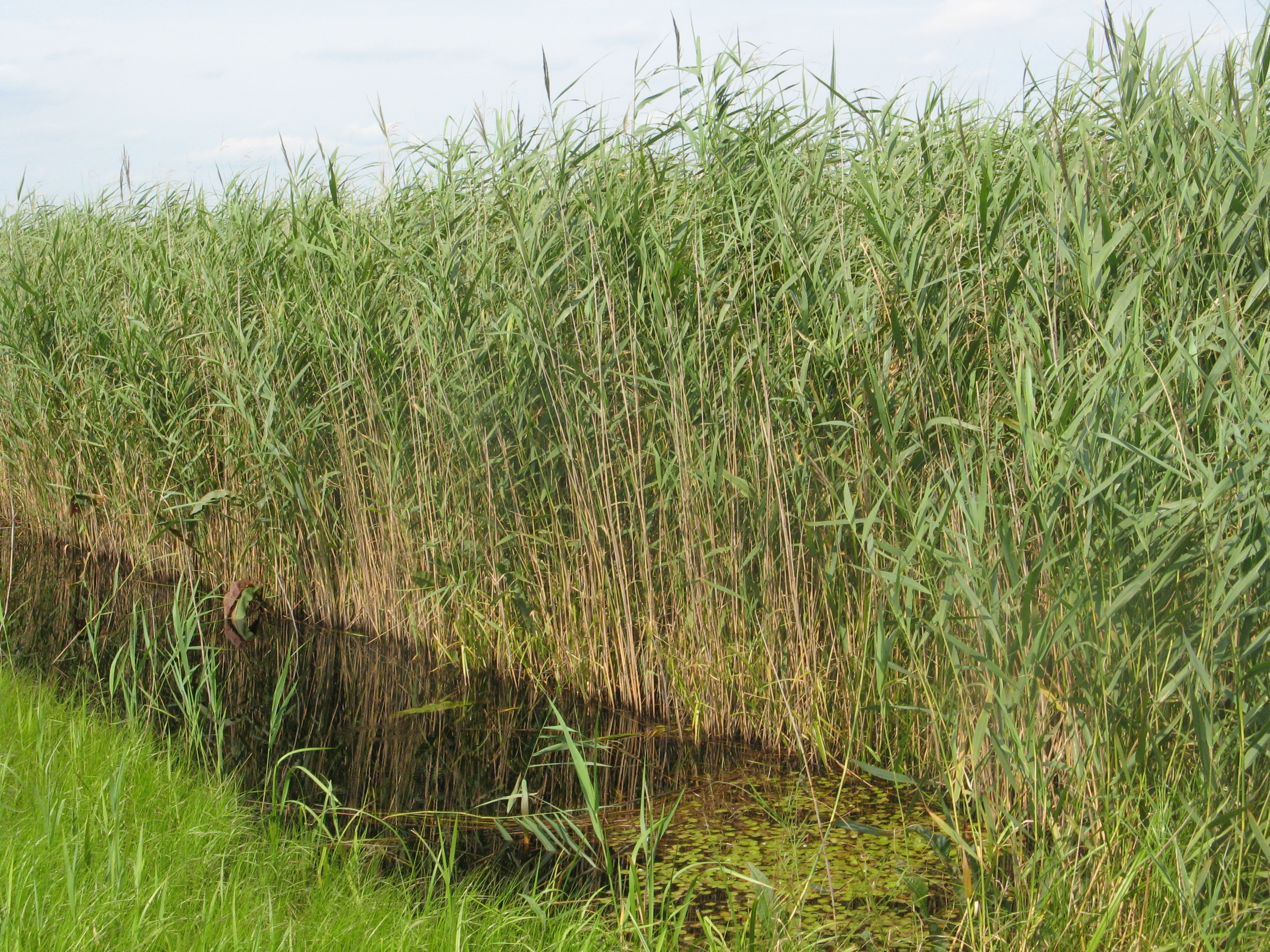
Reeds in the Delver Koog

The Delver Koog is a koog, about 1,200 hectares in area, that is dominated by agricultural grassland and through which one of the large bends of the River Eider meanders. It contains one of the 10 nature reserves in the Eider-Treene Depression in the western part of the German state of Schleswig-Holstein. Since 1976, an area of 190.1 hectares has been protected as a nature reserve. The koog is part of the municipality of Delve in the county of Dithmarschen.

The nature reserve is distinguished by areas of fen with reed beds and meadows of large and small sedge. The many, small, open waterbodies with an extensive irrigation ditch system form an important habitat, especially for birds.

Originally, the region was exploded to the tidal influence of the Eider and was used especially for harvesting thatch. At that time, there was a saying :Wenn Du wullt warrn in't Bett ni natt, denn kumm nan'n Delv un koop Di Dack! ("If you really don't want to be wet in bed, then come to Delve and cut [thatch for] your roof"). Even today, parts of the koog are used to harvest thatch.

When, in 1936, the groundwater level of the region became lower, dykes were built around it and the area was irrigated so thatch harvesting was not endangered; as a result, it became a refuge for animals and plants that live in wet, fenland areas. Extensive areas of reedbed and rare plants such as cottongrass and various species of sedge exist.

The Delver Koog is one of the most important stopover sites for the hen harrier, as well as waders, gulls, and wet meadow birds that rest here during their migration. In addition, reed buntings, Savi's warbler, various reed warblers, great bitterns, and marsh harriers live in Delver Koog.
