= Tertius (sandbank) =

Sandbank in Germany

Tertius Tertius, Tertiussand
- Shoal
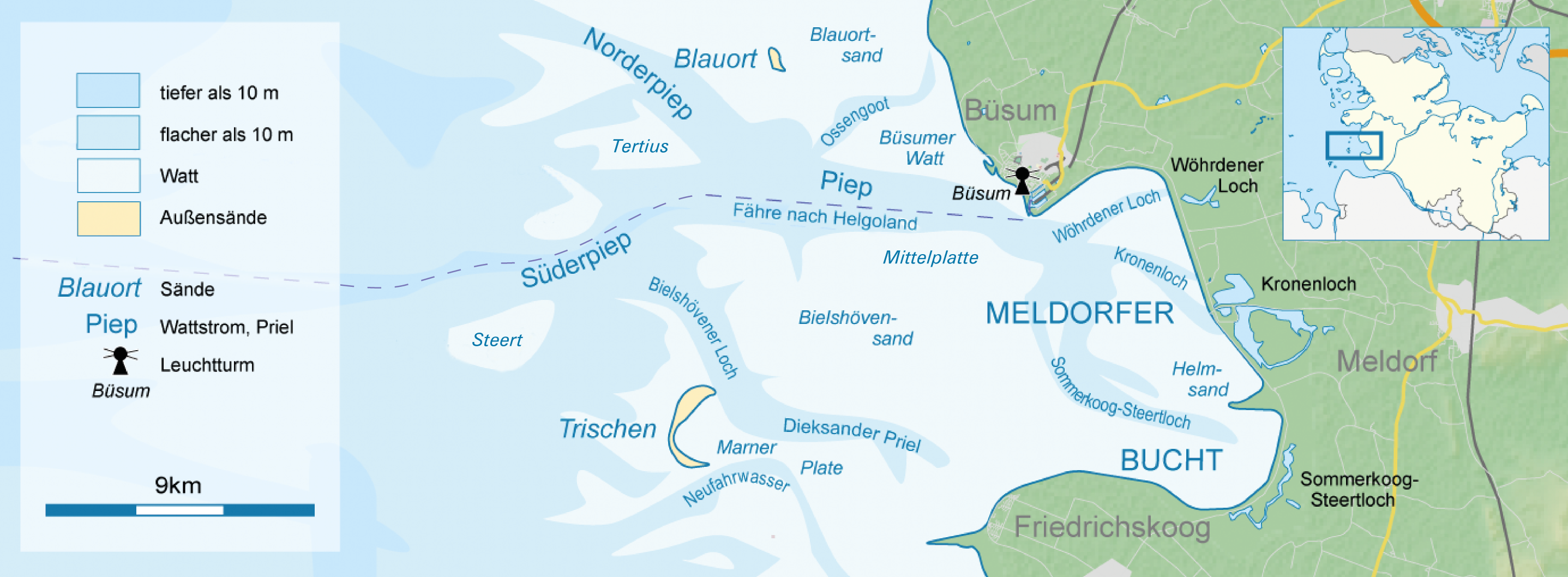
- Map depicting location of Tertius in Meldorf Bay
- Interactive map of Tertius
- Coordinates: 54°8′N 8°42′E
- Location: Schleswig-Holstein, Germany

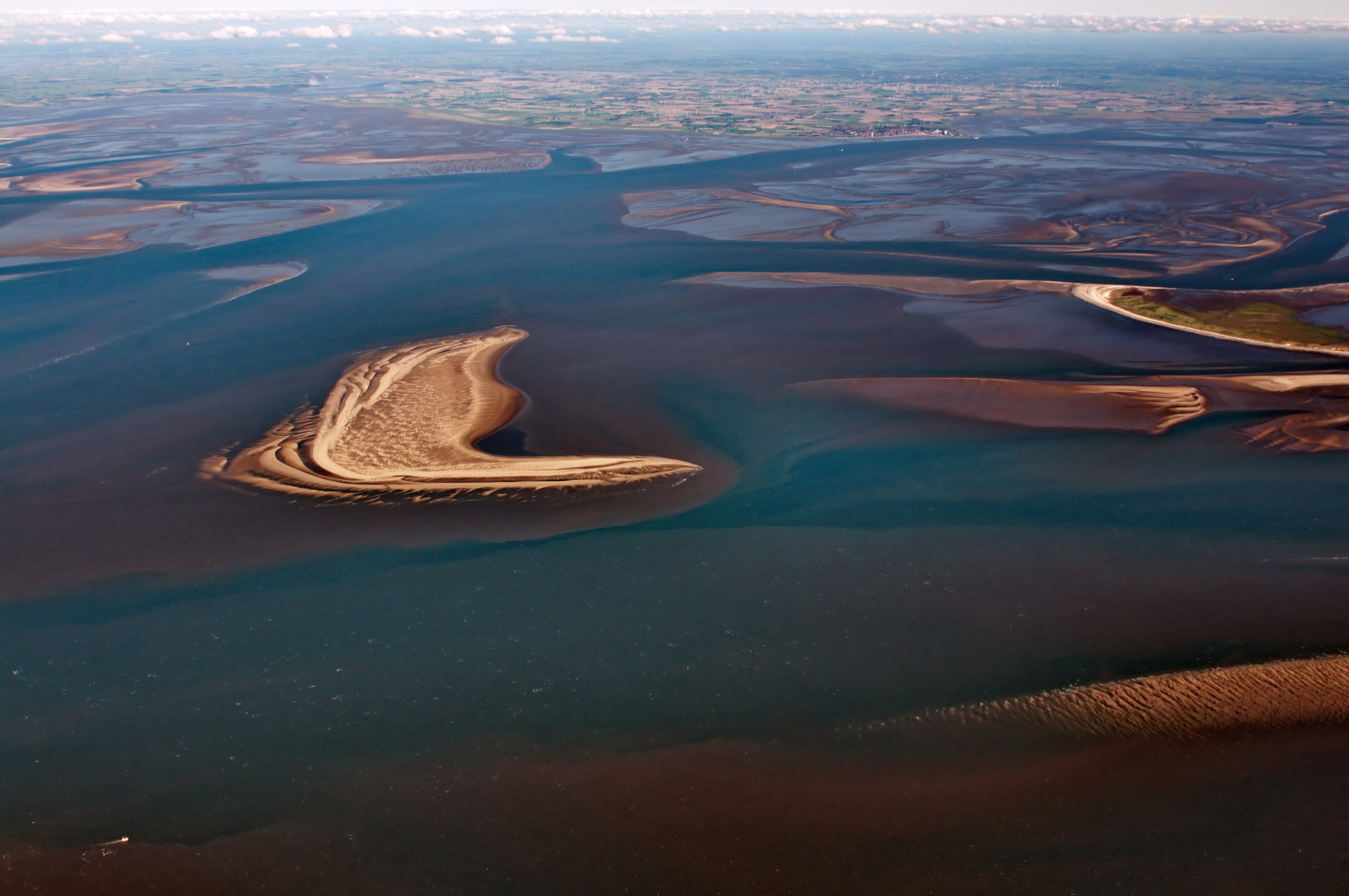
Tertius

Tertius (also known as Tertiussand) is a sandbank located in the Heligoland Bight off the coast of Dithmarschen belonging to the German state of Schleswig-Holstein.

Formerly a Hochsand (a sandbank rising above the ordinary high water mark, effectively an island), Tertius has been reduced in elevation by coastal erosion in recent decades. As a result, the sandbank is frequently submerged and devoid of terrestrial vegetation. Recent satellite images show that Tertius is often even awash at low tide. Like all unprotected islands, Hochsände, and sandbanks off the west coast of Schleswig-Holstein, Tertius is migrating steadily eastwards.

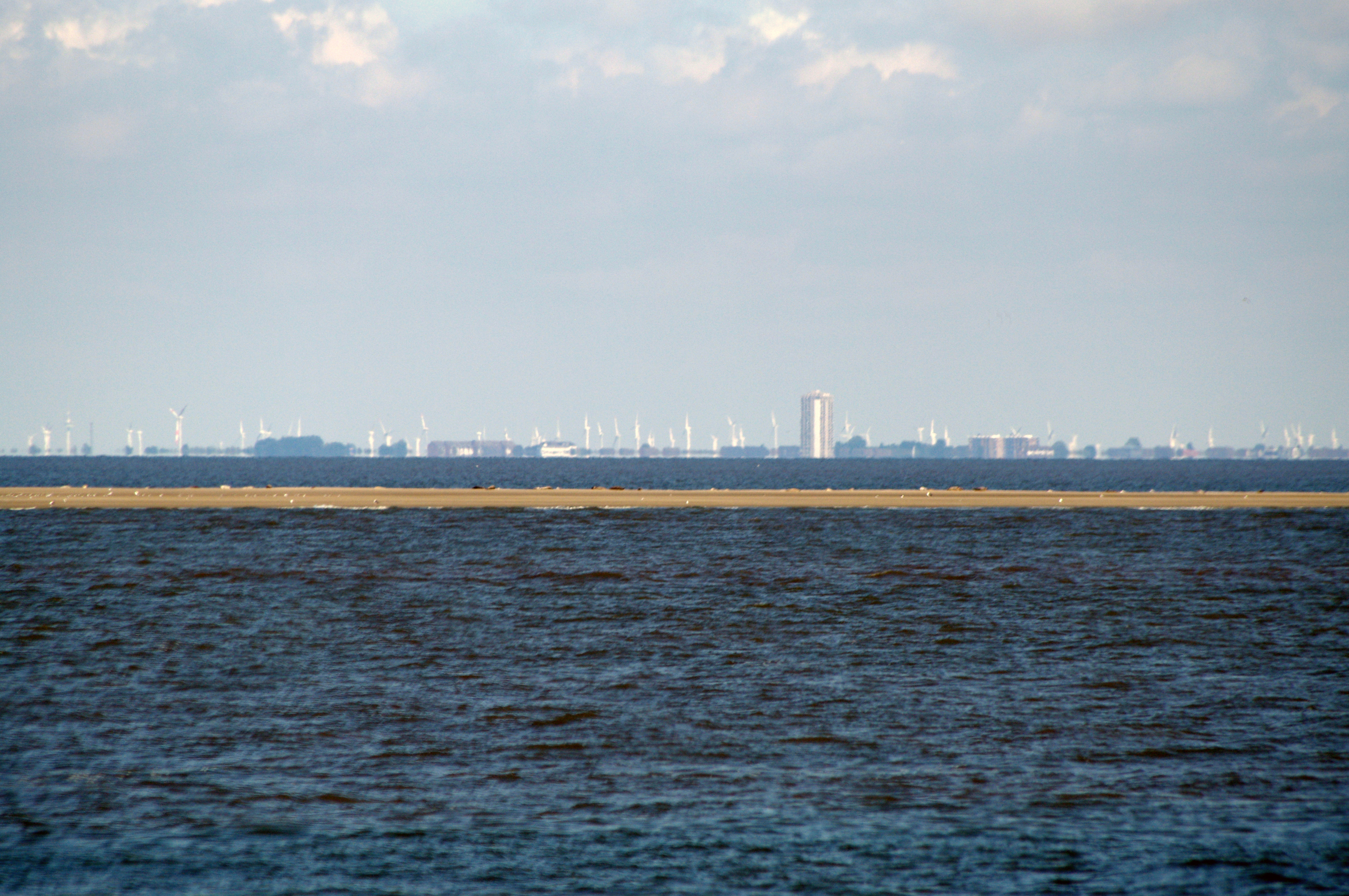
Tertius at low tide, with the city of Büsum in the background. Seals and seabirds can be seen dotting the exposed sandbank

Tertius lies about 10 km west of the popular tourist destination of Büsum in the Meldorf Bay, bordering the tidal channel Piep, which serves as the access waterway to the port of Büsum. To the south lies the island of Trischen, and to the northeast lies the Hochsand of Blauort. According to the Schleswig-Holstein National Park Office in Tönning, Tertius, like Blauort, belongs to the parish of Hedwigenkoog in the district of Dithmarschen. However, the state government of Schleswig-Holstein has not yet officially confirmed and authorised this, so the sandbank technically remains an unorganised location.

Tertius, when not submerged, provides a resting ground for seabirds and seals. Sightseeing tours are sometimes organised from Büsum to observe these animals. Though the sandbank is not part of the highly protected Zone 1 of the Schleswig-Holstein Wadden Sea National Park, public access to Tertius is subject to restrictions.

The only man-made structure on the island is a daymark, which serves as an optical navigational aid for ships.
