= Trischen =

Uninhabited island in north Germany

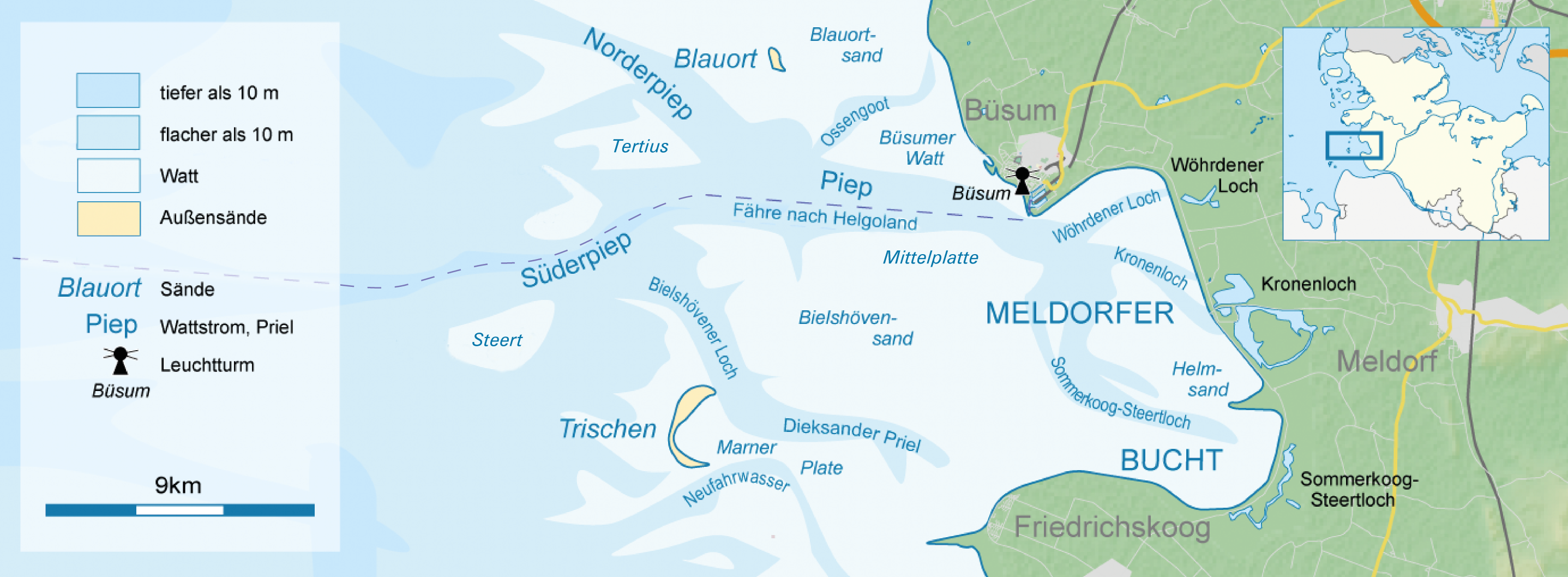
- Map of Meldorf Bay with the islands of Trischen, Tertius and Blauort
- Interactive map of Trischen

Geography
- Location: Meldorf Bay
- Coordinates: 54°03′34″N 08°41′00″E
- Area: 1.8 km^{2} (0.69 sq mi)
- Length: 2.9 km (1.8 mi)
- Width: 1.5 km (0.93 mi)

Administration
- Germany
- State: Schleswig-Holstein
- District: Dithmarschen
- Largest settlement: Luisenhof (historic)

Demographics
- Population: uninhabited

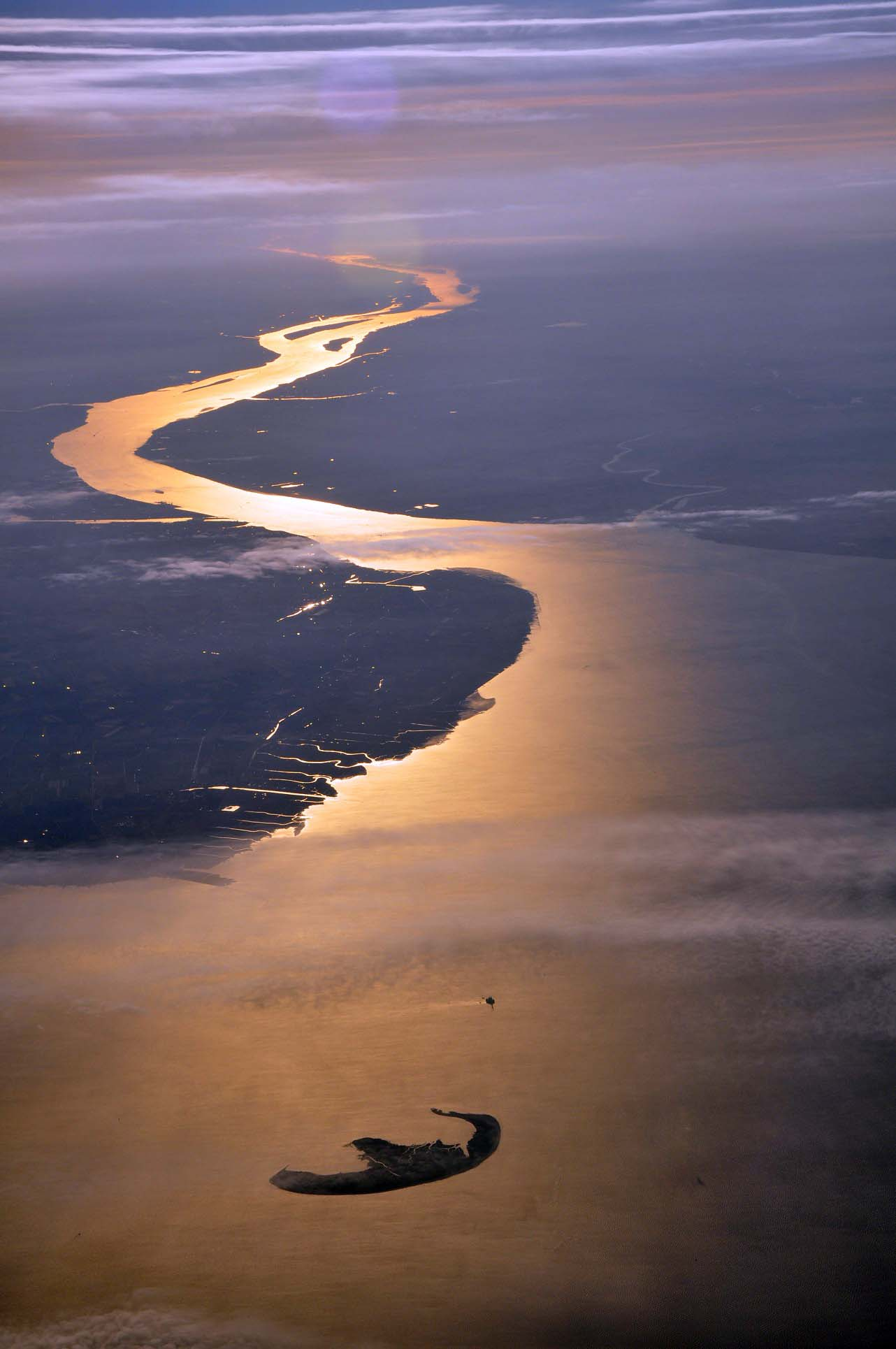
The island of Trischen with the mouth of the river Elbe.

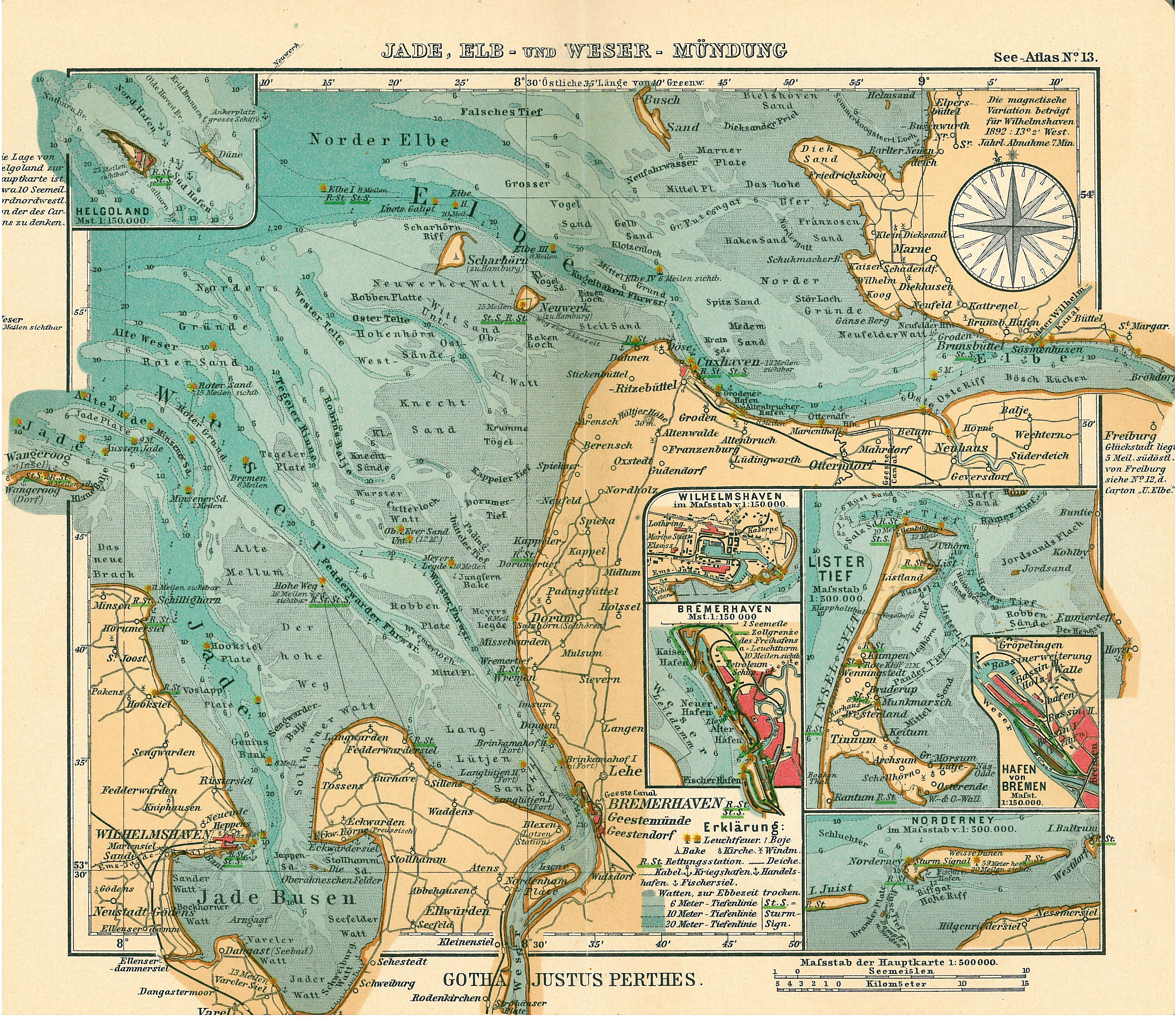
Trischen is still shown as Busch Sand on a 1906 map

Trischen (German pronunciation: [ˈtʁɪʃn̩]) is an uninhabited island in the Meldorf Bay, about 14 kilometres (8.7 miles) off the North Sea coast of Dithmarschen in north Germany – about 12 kilometres (7.5 miles) from the Trischendamm embankment. The island belongs to the municipality of Friedrichskoog and is only occupied from March to October by a bird warden from the Nature and Biodiversity Conservation Union or NABU. Otherwise it is out-of-bounds. Trischen originated about 400 years ago and moves about 3 metres per month (10 feet) towards Büsum on the mainland.

Trischen is visited by birds as a breeding and resting area. Up to 100,000 birds of some species, such as the shelduck, knot or dunlin, occur on the island and in the nearby Wadden Sea. Since 1985 it has been part of the core zone of the Schleswig-Holstein Wadden Sea National Park.
