= Marne-Nordsee =

- Amt
- Flag Coat of arms

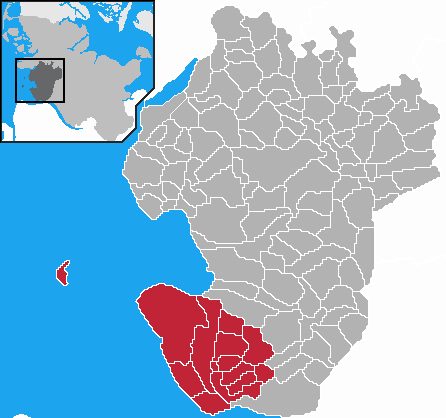
- Map of Dithmarschen highlighting Marne-Nordsee
- Interactive map of Marne-Nordsee
- Location within Germany Location within Schleswig-Holstein
- Coordinates: 53°57′N 9°00′E
- Country: Germany
- State: Schleswig-Holstein
- District: Dithmarschen
- Founded: 2008
- Seat: Marne
- Subdivisions: 13 municipalities

Government
  - Mayor: Harm Schloe

Area
  - Total: 175.75 km^{2} (67.86 sq mi)

Population (2025-12-31)
  - Total: 12,623
  - Density: 71.824/km^{2} (186.02/sq mi)
- Time zone: UTC+01:00 (CET)
  - Summer (DST): UTC+02:00 (CEST)
- Website: amt-marne-nordsee.de

Marne-Nordsee is an Amt ("collective municipality") in the district of Dithmarschen, in Schleswig-Holstein, Germany. Its seat is in Marne. It was formed on 1 January 2008 from the former Amt Kirchspielslandgemeinde Marne-Land, the town Marne and the municipality Friedrichskoog.

The Amt Marne-Nordsee consists of the following municipalities:

1. Diekhusen-Fahrstedt
2. Friedrichskoog
3. Helse
4. Kaiser-Wilhelm-Koog
5. Kronprinzenkoog
6. Marne
7. Marnerdeich
8. Neufeld
9. Neufelderkoog
10. Ramhusen
11. Schmedeswurth
12. Trennewurth
13. Volsemenhusen
