= Helse =

- Municipality
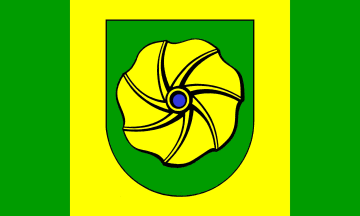
- Flag Coat of arms

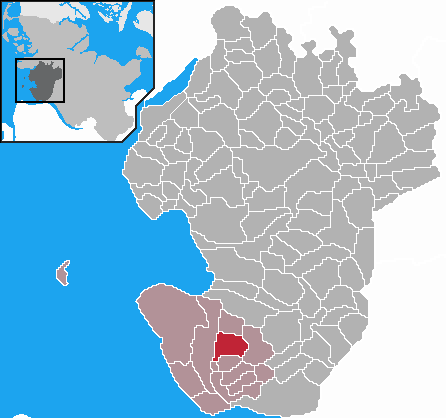
- Location of Helse within Dithmarschen district
- Interactive map of Helse
- Location within Germany Location within Schleswig-Holstein
- Coordinates: 53°58′N 9°1′E
- Country: Germany
- State: Schleswig-Holstein
- District: Dithmarschen
- Municipal assoc.: Marne-Nordsee
- Subdivisions: 9

Government
  - Mayor: Hans-Hermann Meier (SPD)

Area
  - Total: 11.44 km^{2} (4.42 sq mi)
- Elevation: 4 m (13 ft)

Population (2025-12-31)
  - Total: 854
  - Density: 74.7/km^{2} (193/sq mi)
- Time zone: UTC+01:00 (CET)
  - Summer (DST): UTC+02:00 (CEST)
- Postal codes: 25709
- Dialling codes: 04851
- Vehicle registration: HEI
- Website: www.amt-marne-nordsee.de

Helse (German pronunciation: [ˈhɛlzə]) is a municipality in the district of Dithmarschen, in Schleswig-Holstein, Germany.
