= Kronprinzenkoog =

- Municipality
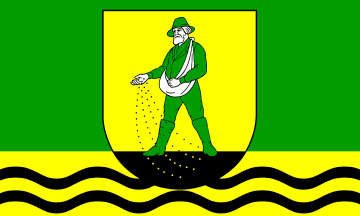
- Flag Coat of arms

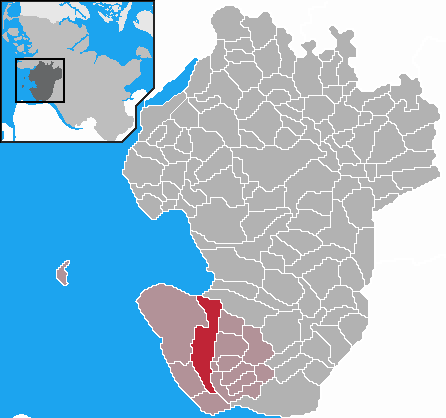
- Location of Kronprinzenkoog within Dithmarschen district
- Interactive map of Kronprinzenkoog
- Location within Germany Location within Schleswig-Holstein
- Coordinates: 53°58′N 8°58′E
- Country: Germany
- State: Schleswig-Holstein
- District: Dithmarschen
- Municipal assoc.: Marne-Nordsee

Government
  - Mayor: Georg Huesmann (CDU)

Area
  - Total: 28.84 km^{2} (11.14 sq mi)
- Elevation: 0 m (0 ft)

Population (2025-12-31)
  - Total: 831
  - Density: 28.8/km^{2} (74.6/sq mi)
- Time zone: UTC+01:00 (CET)
  - Summer (DST): UTC+02:00 (CEST)
- Postal codes: 25709
- Dialling codes: 04856, 04857 und 04851
- Vehicle registration: HEI
- Website: www.amt-marne-nordsee.de

Kronprinzenkoog (German pronunciation: [ˈkʁoːnpʁɪntsn̩ˌkoːk], lit. 'Crown Prince Polder') is a municipality in the district of Dithmarschen, in Schleswig-Holstein, Germany.

Between 1785 and 1787, the Koog (polder) was laid out and then named in honour of Crown Prince Frederick of Denmark.
