= Schmedeswurth =

- Municipality
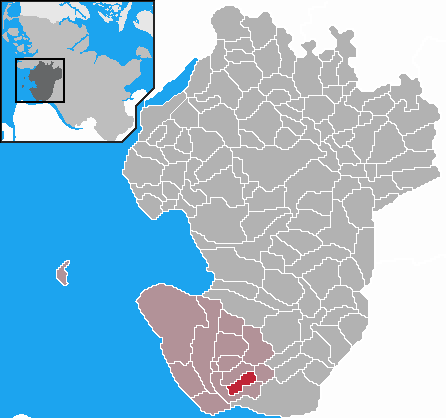
- Location of Schmedeswurth within Dithmarschen district
- Interactive map of Schmedeswurth
- Location within Germany Location within Schleswig-Holstein
- Coordinates: 53°55′N 9°3′E
- Country: Germany
- State: Schleswig-Holstein
- District: Dithmarschen
- Municipal assoc.: Marne-Nordsee
- Subdivisions: 5

Government
  - Mayor: Harm Schloe

Area
  - Total: 5.91 km^{2} (2.28 sq mi)
- Elevation: 1 m (3.3 ft)

Population (2025-12-31)
  - Total: 178
  - Density: 30.1/km^{2} (78.0/sq mi)
- Time zone: UTC+01:00 (CET)
  - Summer (DST): UTC+02:00 (CEST)
- Postal codes: 25724
- Dialling codes: 04851
- Vehicle registration: HEI
- Website: www.amt-marne-nordsee.de

Schmedeswurth (German pronunciation: [ˈʃmeːdəsvʊʁt]) is a municipality in the district of Dithmarschen, in Schleswig-Holstein, Germany.
