= Ramhusen =

- Municipality
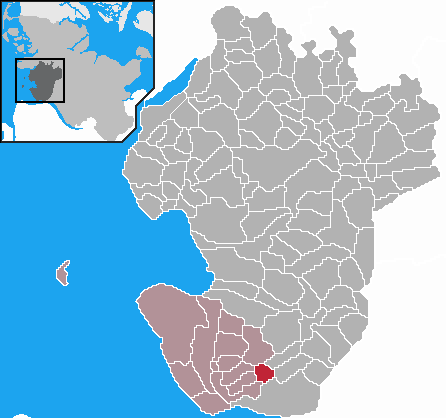
- Location of Ramhusen within Dithmarschen district
- Interactive map of Ramhusen
- Location within Germany Location within Schleswig-Holstein
- Coordinates: 53°57′N 09°05′E
- Country: Germany
- State: Schleswig-Holstein
- District: Dithmarschen
- Municipal assoc.: Marne-Nordsee
- Subdivisions: 6

Government
  - Mayor: Ernst-Jürgen Matthießen

Area
  - Total: 4.8 km^{2} (1.9 sq mi)
- Elevation: 4 m (13 ft)

Population (2025-12-31)
  - Total: 162
  - Density: 34/km^{2} (87/sq mi)
- Time zone: UTC+01:00 (CET)
  - Summer (DST): UTC+02:00 (CEST)
- Postal codes: 25715
- Dialling codes: 04851 u. 04855
- Vehicle registration: HEI
- Website: www.amt-marne-nordsee.de

Ramhusen is a municipality in the district of Dithmarschen, in Schleswig-Holstein, Germany.
