= Tümlauer-Koog =

Tümlauer Koog Tømlaus Kog
- Municipality
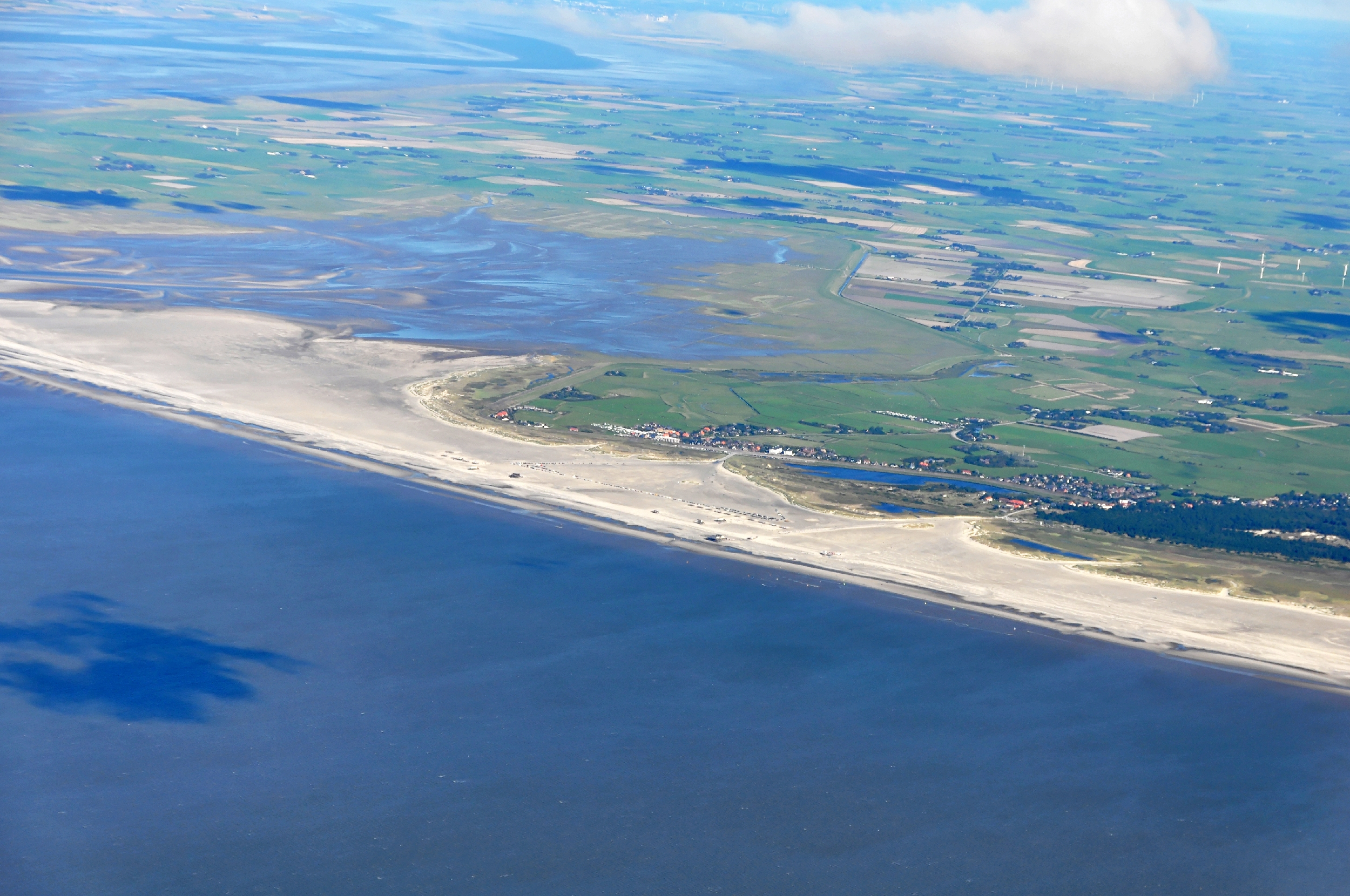

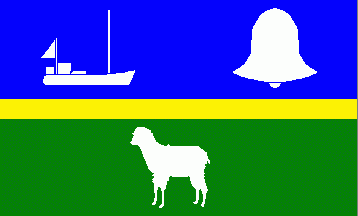
- Flag Coat of arms

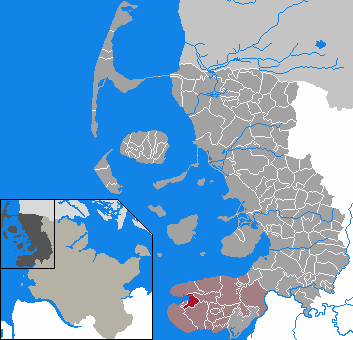
- Location of Tümlauer Koog; Tømlaus Kog within Nordfriesland district
- Interactive map of Tümlauer Koog; Tømlaus Kog
- Location within Germany Location within Schleswig-Holstein
- Coordinates: 54°21′N 8°41′E
- Country: Germany
- State: Schleswig-Holstein
- District: Nordfriesland

Government
  - Mayor: Hilke Herzberg

Area
  - Total: 6.2 km^{2} (2.4 sq mi)
- Elevation: 0 m (0 ft)

Population (2025-12-31)
  - Total: 104
  - Density: 17/km^{2} (43/sq mi)
- Time zone: UTC+01:00 (CET)
  - Summer (DST): UTC+02:00 (CEST)
- Postal codes: 25881
- Dialling codes: 04862, 04863
- Vehicle registration: NF
- Website: www.tuemlauer-koog.de

Tümlauer-Koog (Danish: Tømlaus Kog) is a municipality in the district of Nordfriesland, in Schleswig-Holstein, Germany.

Within the municipality is Tümlau Bay.

== See also ==
- Eiderstedt Peninsula
