= Trennewurth =

- Municipality
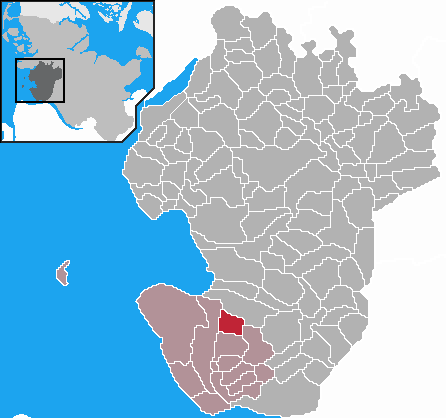
- Location of Trennewurth within Dithmarschen district
- Interactive map of Trennewurth
- Location within Germany Location within Schleswig-Holstein
- Coordinates: 54°0′7″N 9°1′39″E
- Country: Germany
- State: Schleswig-Holstein
- District: Dithmarschen
- Municipal assoc.: Marne-Nordsee
- Subdivisions: 4

Government
  - Mayor: Ellen Johannssen

Area
  - Total: 7.79 km^{2} (3.01 sq mi)
- Elevation: 2 m (6.6 ft)

Population (2025-12-31)
  - Total: 239
  - Density: 30.7/km^{2} (79.5/sq mi)
- Time zone: UTC+01:00 (CET)
  - Summer (DST): UTC+02:00 (CEST)
- Postal codes: 25693
- Dialling codes: 04857
- Vehicle registration: HEI
- Website: www.amt-marne-nordsee.de

Trennewurth (German pronunciation: [ˈtʁɛnəvʊʁt]) is a municipality in the district of Dithmarschen, in Schleswig-Holstein, Germany.
