= Blauort =

Islet of Germany

Coordinates: 54°10′00″N 8°43′15″E

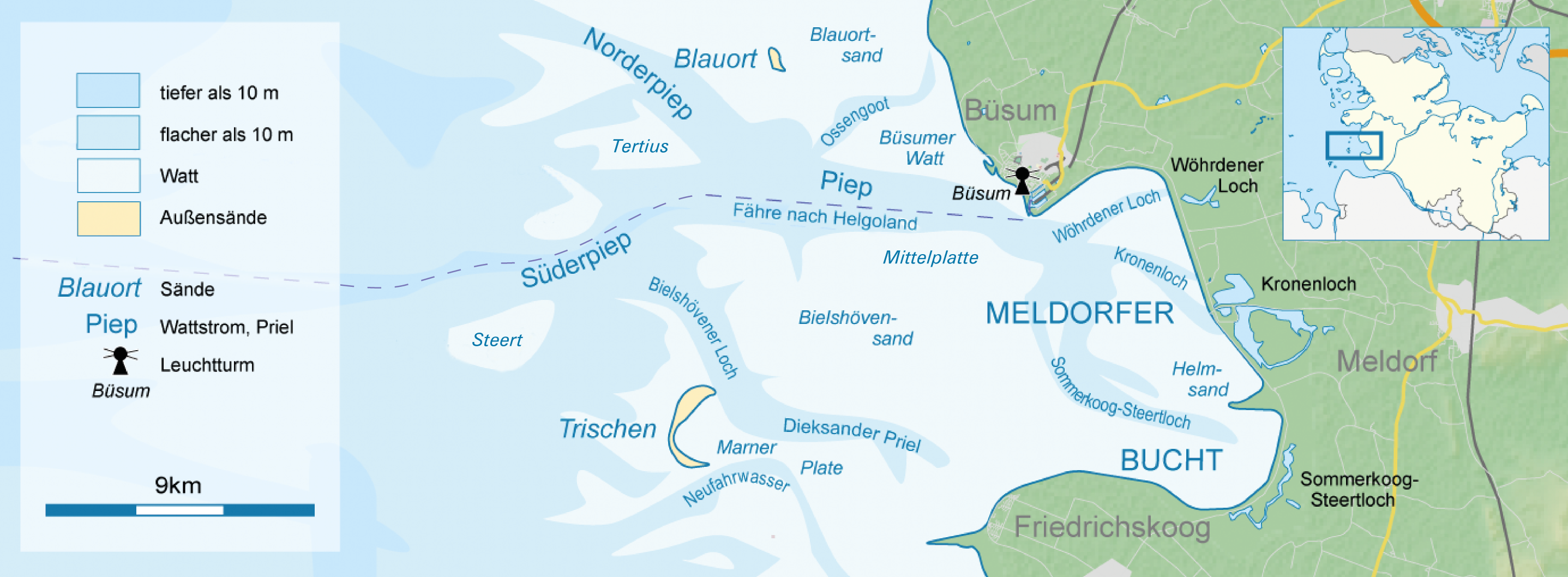
Map of Meldorf Bay with Blauort in the north; south of it lie Tertius and Trischen

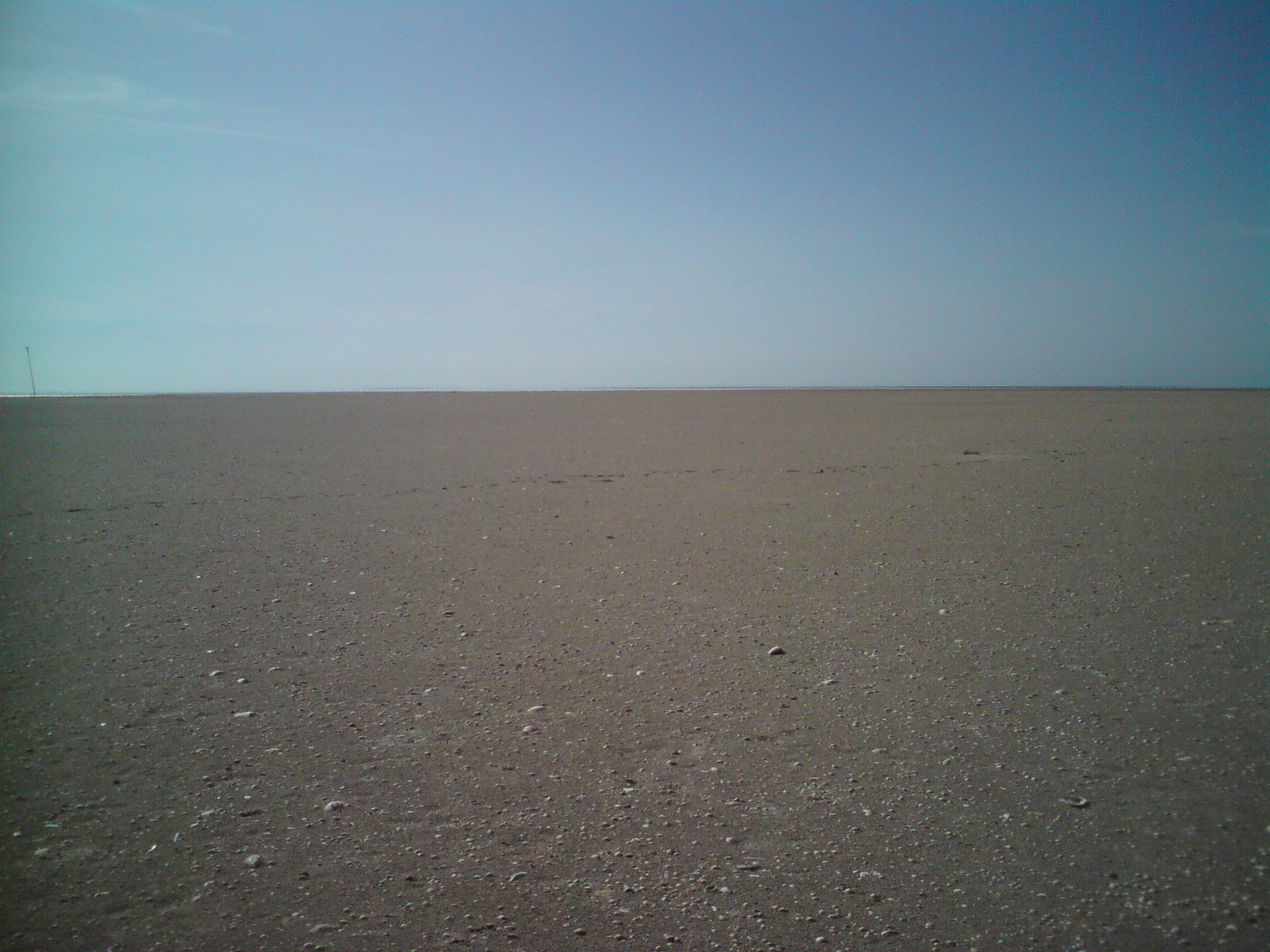
Blauort looking roughly southwest. On the left a channel marker (Pricke) can be made out which marks the Norderpiep channel.

Blauort (German pronunciation: [ˈblaʊˌʔɔʁt]) is one of Germany's uninhabited North Sea sandy islets off the coast of Dithmarschen (near Büsum), and measures about 1,200 m from north to south and 500 metres from east to west. It is surrounded by the sandbank of Blauortsand, which is bounded to the north by the creek of the Wesselburener Loch and to the south by the Piep.

According to the Schleswig-Holstein National Park Office in Tönning, Blauort, like the sandbank of Tertius to the south, belongs to the parish of Hedwigenkoog. However, the state government of Schleswig-Holstein has not yet officially confirmed and authorised this.

The islet of Blauort is migrating steadily eastwards, like all sandy islands on the west coast of Schleswig-Holstein. From 1938 to 1962, the sand moved towards the land at a rate of about 32 metres per year and, at present, it is about six miles from the coast. Blauort's highest point lies above the average high tide (which is about 1.83 m above sea level (NN)) and is only completely submerged by spring tides or storm surges. There is no vegetation on Blauort. Blauort is one of the few, largely unspoilt habitats on the coast and of great importance for seabirds and common seals, Since 1985 it has been part of protection zone I in the Schleswig-Holstein Wadden Sea National Park.

Blauort is marked by a daymark, the Blauortbake ("Blauort daymark"). In the summer months, guided mudflat walks of the Blauortsand are offered which depart from Büsum and Wesselburen.

The Büsumer writer, Stefanie Bach Stein, called one of her books of poetry Blauort.

== See also ==
- North Frisian Barrier Island
