= Kaiser-Wilhelm-Koog =

- Municipality
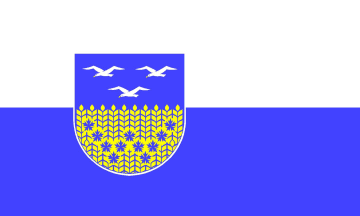
- Flag Coat of arms

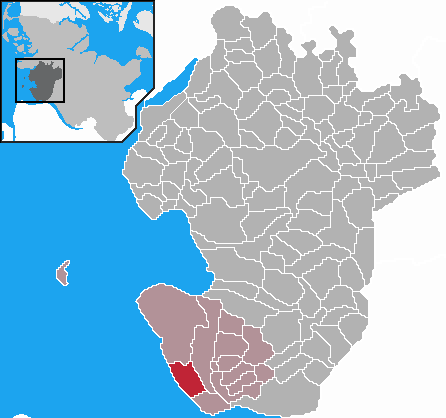
- Location of Kaiser-Wilhelm-Koog within Dithmarschen district
- Interactive map of Kaiser-Wilhelm-Koog
- Location within Germany Location within Schleswig-Holstein
- Coordinates: 53°56′34″N 8°55′36″E
- Country: Germany
- State: Schleswig-Holstein
- District: Dithmarschen
- Municipal assoc.: Marne-Nordsee

Government
  - Mayor: Ernst-Otto Wilkens

Area
  - Total: 13.05 km^{2} (5.04 sq mi)
- Elevation: 0 m (0 ft)

Population (2025-12-31)
  - Total: 319
  - Density: 24.4/km^{2} (63.3/sq mi)
- Time zone: UTC+01:00 (CET)
  - Summer (DST): UTC+02:00 (CEST)
- Postal codes: 25709
- Dialling codes: 04856
- Vehicle registration: HEI
- Website: www.kaiser-wilhelm-koog.de

Kaiser-Wilhelm-Koog (German pronunciation: [kaɪzɐˈvɪlhɛlmˌkoːk], lit. 'Emperor William Koog') is a municipality situated along the North Sea coast in the district of Dithmarschen, in Schleswig-Holstein, Germany.

The municipality is located in and named after the Koog (polder), which was finished in 1874 and named in honour of German Emperor William I. The Koog is entirely reclaimed land and therefore a completely flat area and is 0 meters above sea level.
