= Volsemenhusen =

- Municipality
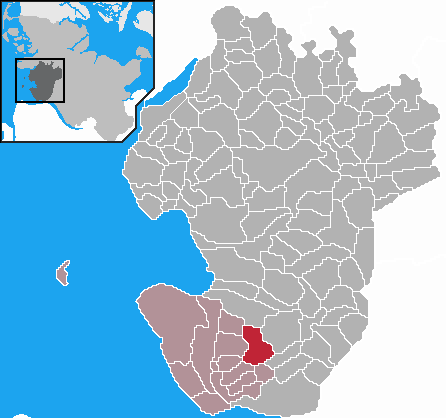
- Location of Volsemenhusen within Dithmarschen district
- Interactive map of Volsemenhusen
- Location within Germany Location within Schleswig-Holstein
- Coordinates: 53°58′N 9°5′E
- Country: Germany
- State: Schleswig-Holstein
- District: Dithmarschen
- Municipal assoc.: Marne-Nordsee
- Subdivisions: 12

Government
  - Mayor: Reimer Tjarks

Area
  - Total: 16.79 km^{2} (6.48 sq mi)
- Elevation: 4 m (13 ft)

Population (2025-12-31)
  - Total: 322
  - Density: 19.2/km^{2} (49.7/sq mi)
- Time zone: UTC+01:00 (CET)
  - Summer (DST): UTC+02:00 (CEST)
- Postal codes: 25693
- Dialling codes: 04851 - 04853
- Vehicle registration: HEI
- Website: www.amt-marne-nordsee.de

Volsemenhusen is a municipality in the district of Dithmarschen, in Schleswig-Holstein, Germany.
