= Marne, Germany =

Marne
- Town
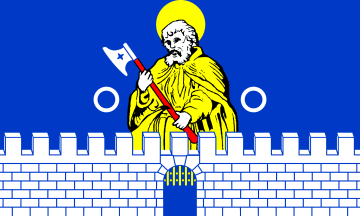
- Flag Coat of arms

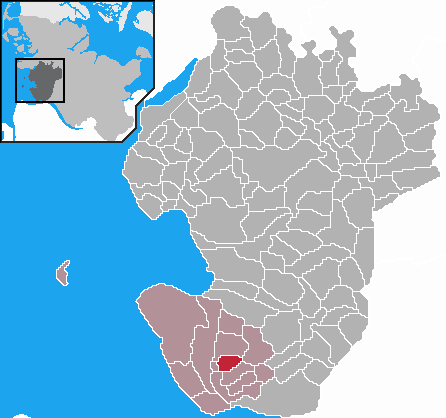
- Location of Marne within Dithmarschen district
- Interactive map of Marne
- Location within Germany Location within Schleswig-Holstein
- Coordinates: 53°57′N 09°00′E
- Country: Germany
- State: Schleswig-Holstein
- District: Dithmarschen
- Municipal assoc.: Marne-Nordsee

Government
  - Mayor: Klaus Braak (CDU)

Area
  - Total: 4.83 km^{2} (1.86 sq mi)
- Elevation: 3 m (9.8 ft)

Population (2025-12-31)
  - Total: 5,558
  - Density: 1,150/km^{2} (2,980/sq mi)
- Time zone: UTC+01:00 (CET)
  - Summer (DST): UTC+02:00 (CEST)
- Postal codes: 25709
- Dialling codes: 04851
- Vehicle registration: HEI
- Website: www.marne.de

Marne (German pronunciation: [ˈmaʁnə]; Low German: Marn) is a town in the district of Dithmarschen, in Schleswig-Holstein, Germany. It is situated near the North Sea coast, approximately 30 km (19 mi) south of Heide, and 25 km (16 mi) northeast of Cuxhaven.

Marne is the seat of the Amt ("collective municipality") Marne-Nordsee.

== gallery ==
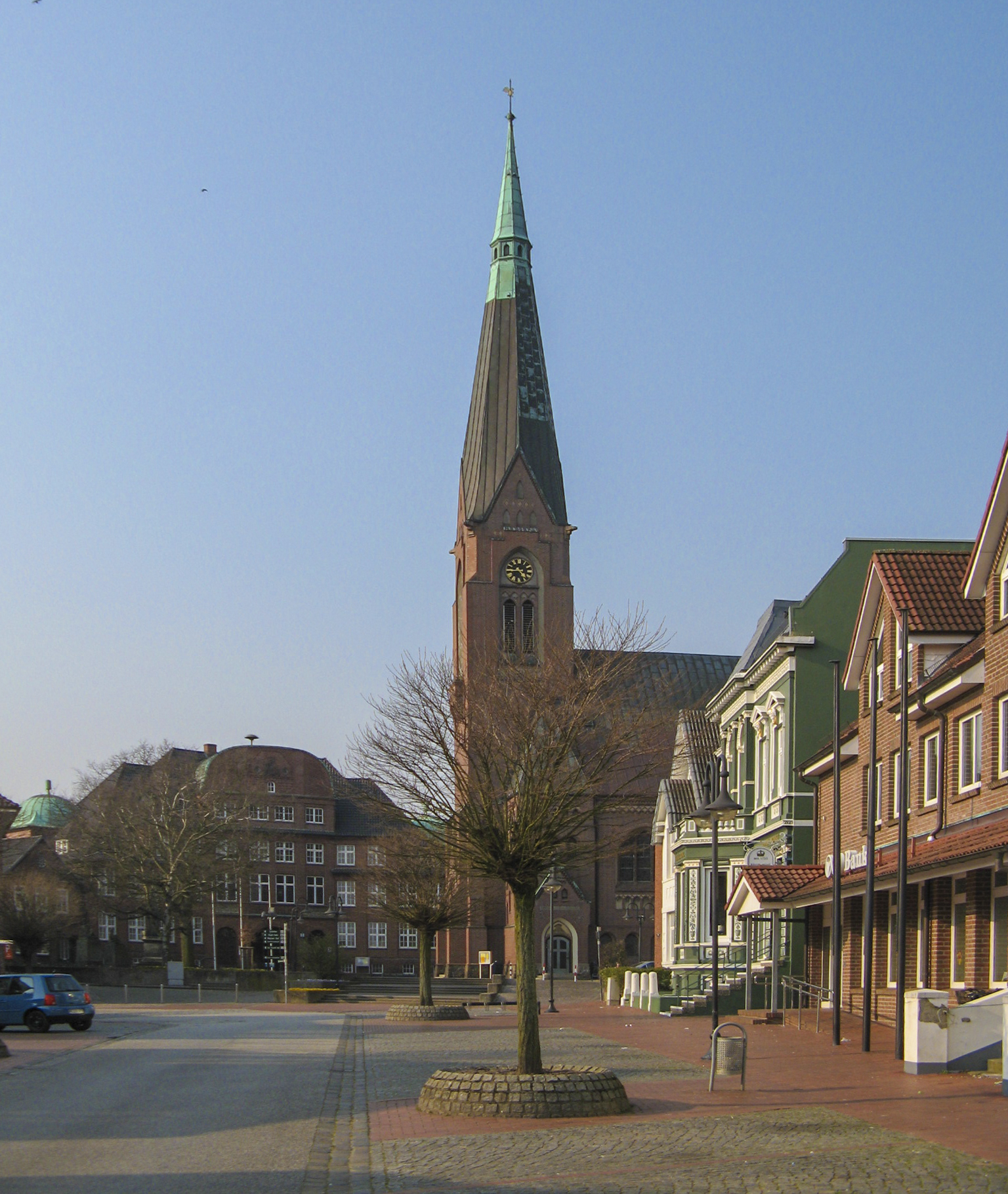
Church and city hall

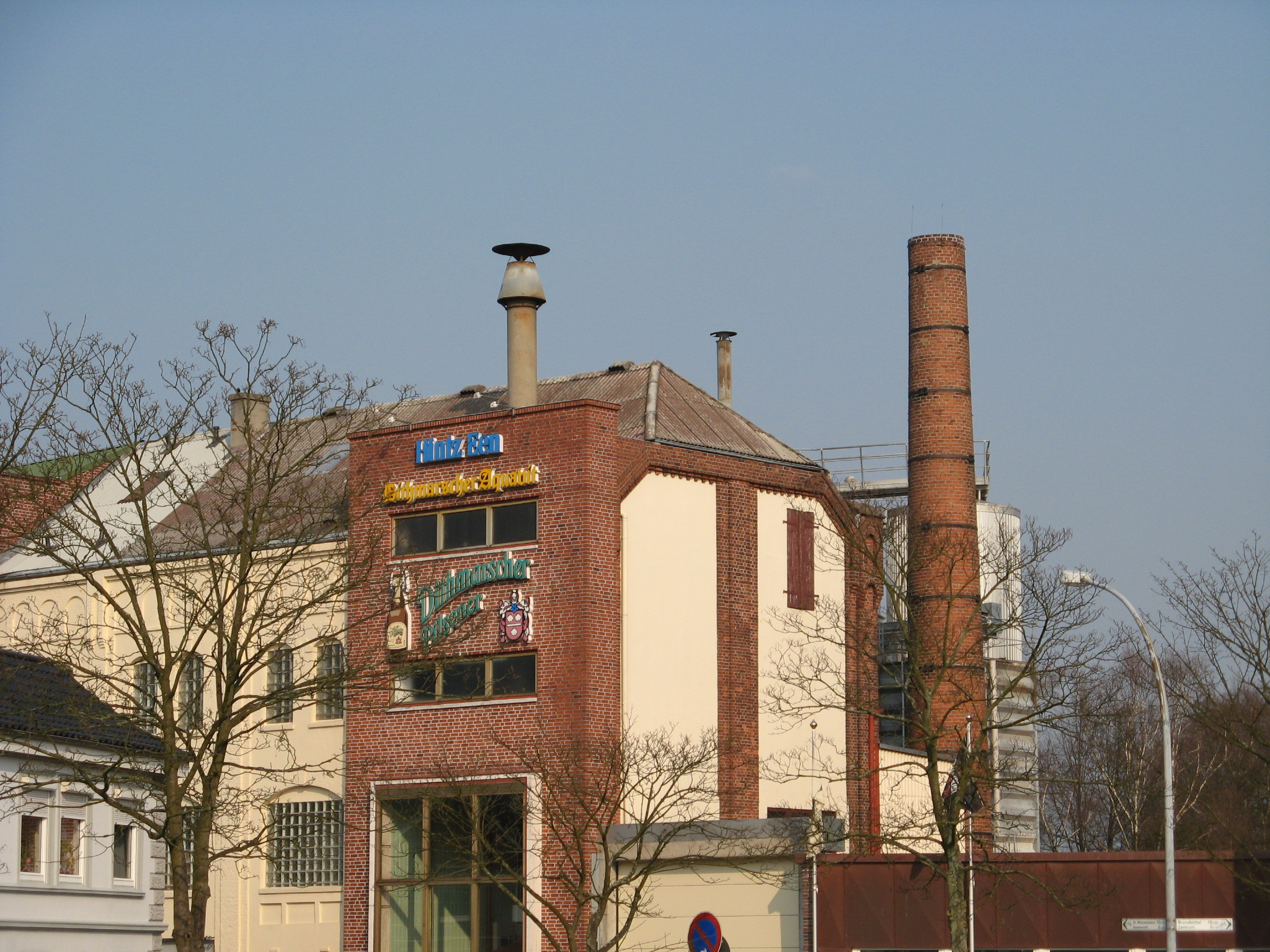
Brewery Hintz

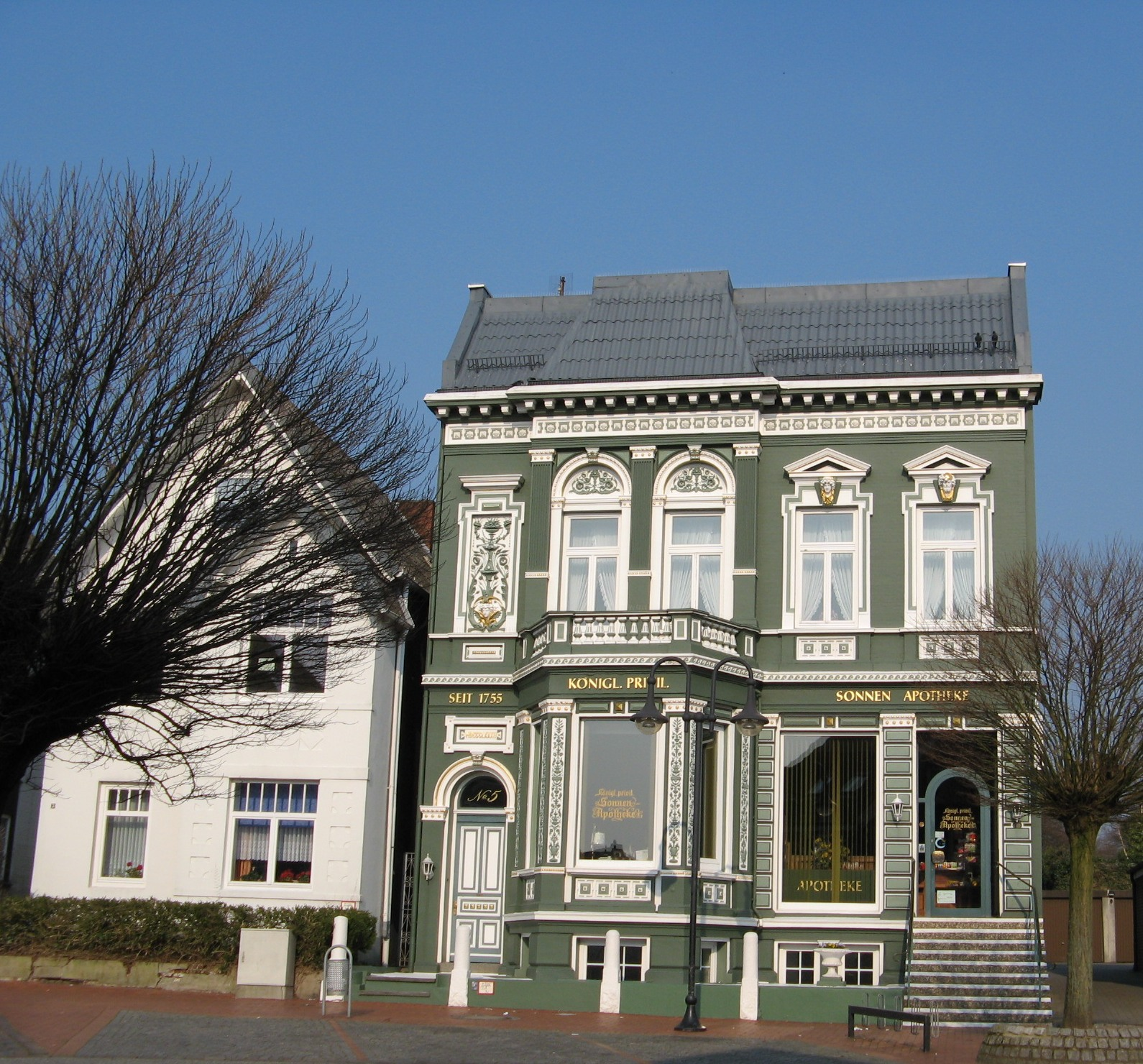
Pharmacy Sonnen-Apotheke (founded in 1755)
