= Diekhusen-Fahrstedt =

- Municipality
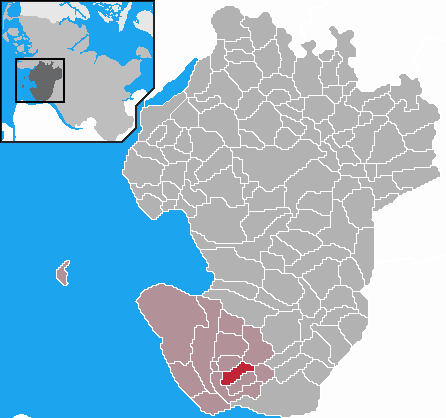
- Location of Diekhusen-Fahrstedt within Dithmarschen district
- Interactive map of Diekhusen-Fahrstedt
- Location within Germany Location within Schleswig-Holstein
- Coordinates: 53°56′N 9°1′E
- Country: Germany
- State: Schleswig-Holstein
- District: Dithmarschen
- Municipal assoc.: Marne-Nordsee
- Subdivisions: 5

Government
  - Mayor: Hermann Erdmann

Area
  - Total: 7.46 km^{2} (2.88 sq mi)
- Elevation: 2 m (6.6 ft)

Population (2025-12-31)
  - Total: 651
  - Density: 87.3/km^{2} (226/sq mi)
- Time zone: UTC+01:00 (CET)
  - Summer (DST): UTC+02:00 (CEST)
- Postal codes: 25709
- Dialling codes: 04851
- Vehicle registration: HEI
- Website: www.amt-marne-nordsee.de

Diekhusen-Fahrstedt (German pronunciation: [ˌdiːkhuːzn̩ˈfaːɐ̯ʃtɛt]) is a municipality in the district of Dithmarschen, in Schleswig-Holstein, Germany.
