= Friedrichskoog =

- Municipality
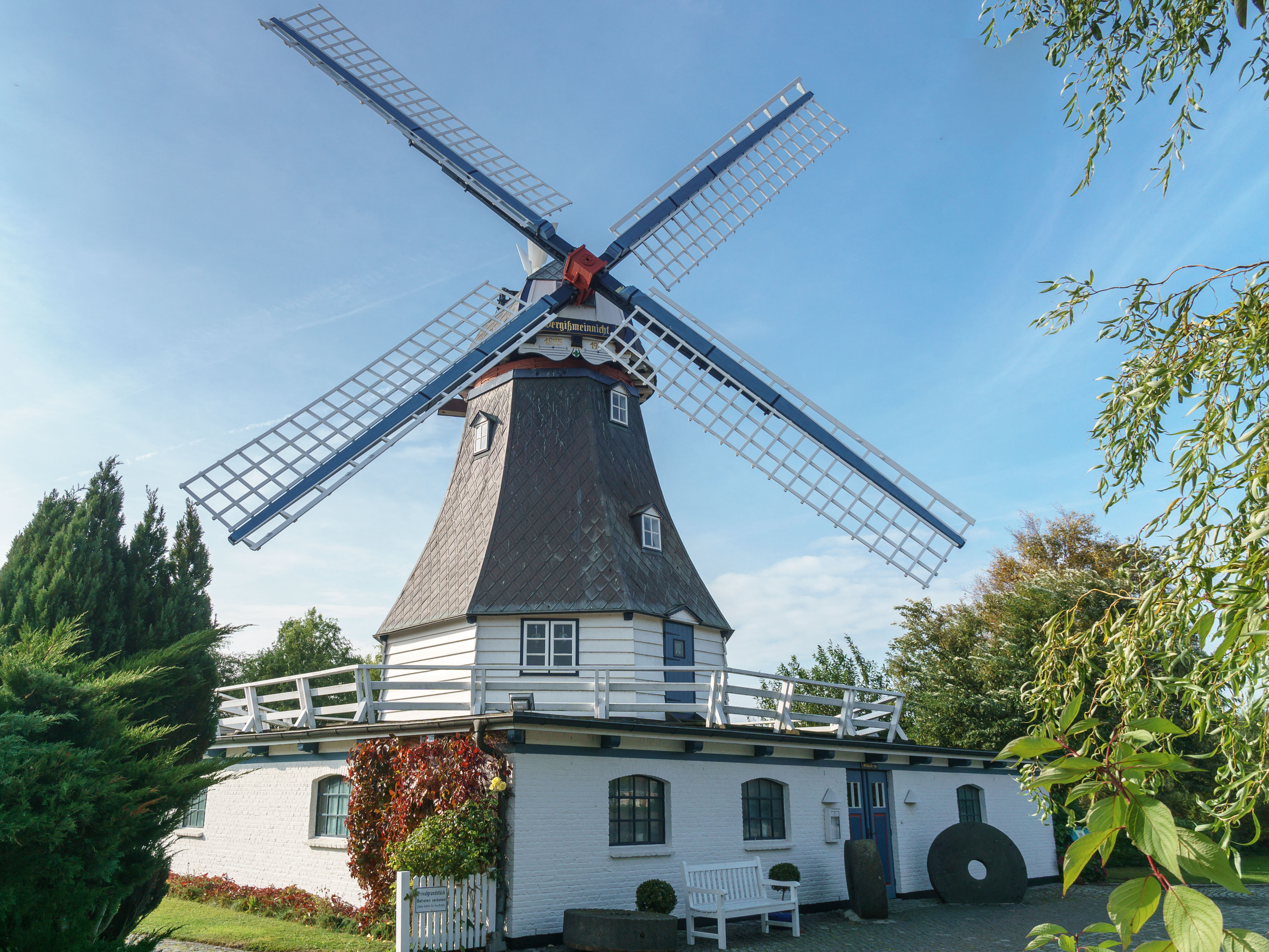

- Flag Coat of arms

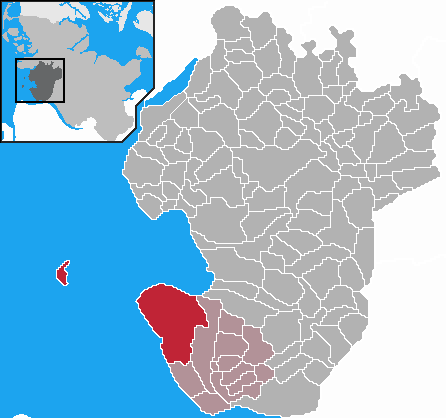
- Location of Friedrichskoog within Dithmarschen district
- Interactive map of Friedrichskoog
- Location within Germany Location within Schleswig-Holstein
- Coordinates: 54°1′N 8°55′E
- Country: Germany
- State: Schleswig-Holstein
- District: Dithmarschen
- Municipal assoc.: Marne-Nordsee

Government
  - Mayor: Karl Heinrich Thomsen

Area
  - Total: 53.27 km^{2} (20.57 sq mi)
- Elevation: 0 m (0 ft)

Population (2025-12-31)
  - Total: 2,423
  - Density: 45.49/km^{2} (117.8/sq mi)
- Time zone: UTC+01:00 (CET)
  - Summer (DST): UTC+02:00 (CEST)
- Postal codes: 25718
- Dialling codes: 04854, 04856
- Vehicle registration: HEI

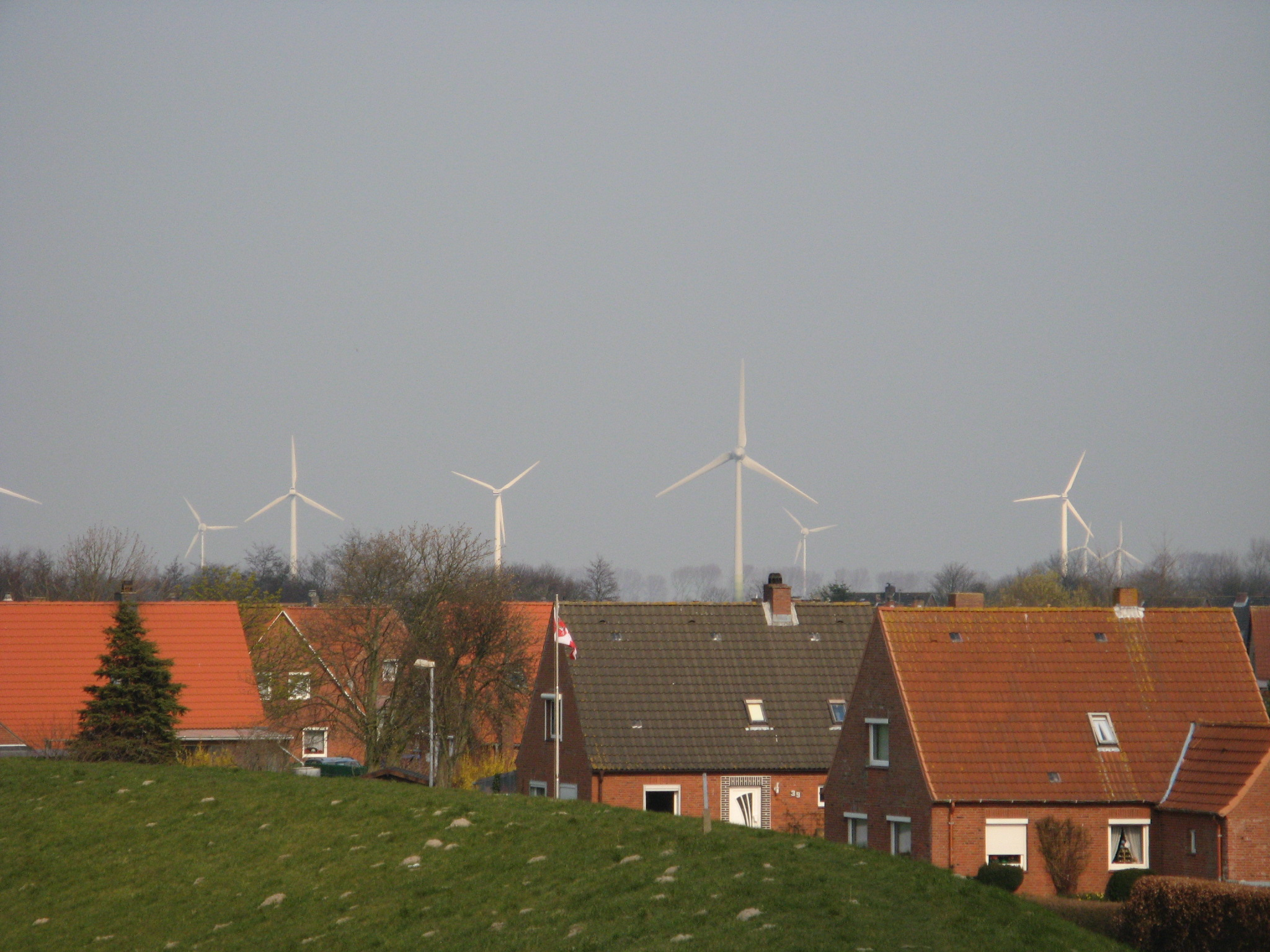
Friedrichskoog mit windraeders

Friedrichskoog (German pronunciation: [ˈfʁiːdʁɪçsˌkoːk]; Low German: Friechskouch) is a municipality in the district of Dithmarschen, in Schleswig-Holstein, Germany. It is situated near the outflow of the Elbe into the North Sea, approximately 25 km southwest of Heide, and 25 km northeast of Cuxhaven. The uninhabited island Trischen is part of the municipality.

The municipality is located in and named after the koog (polder), which was named in honour of King Frederick VII of Denmark.
