= Neufeld =

- Municipality
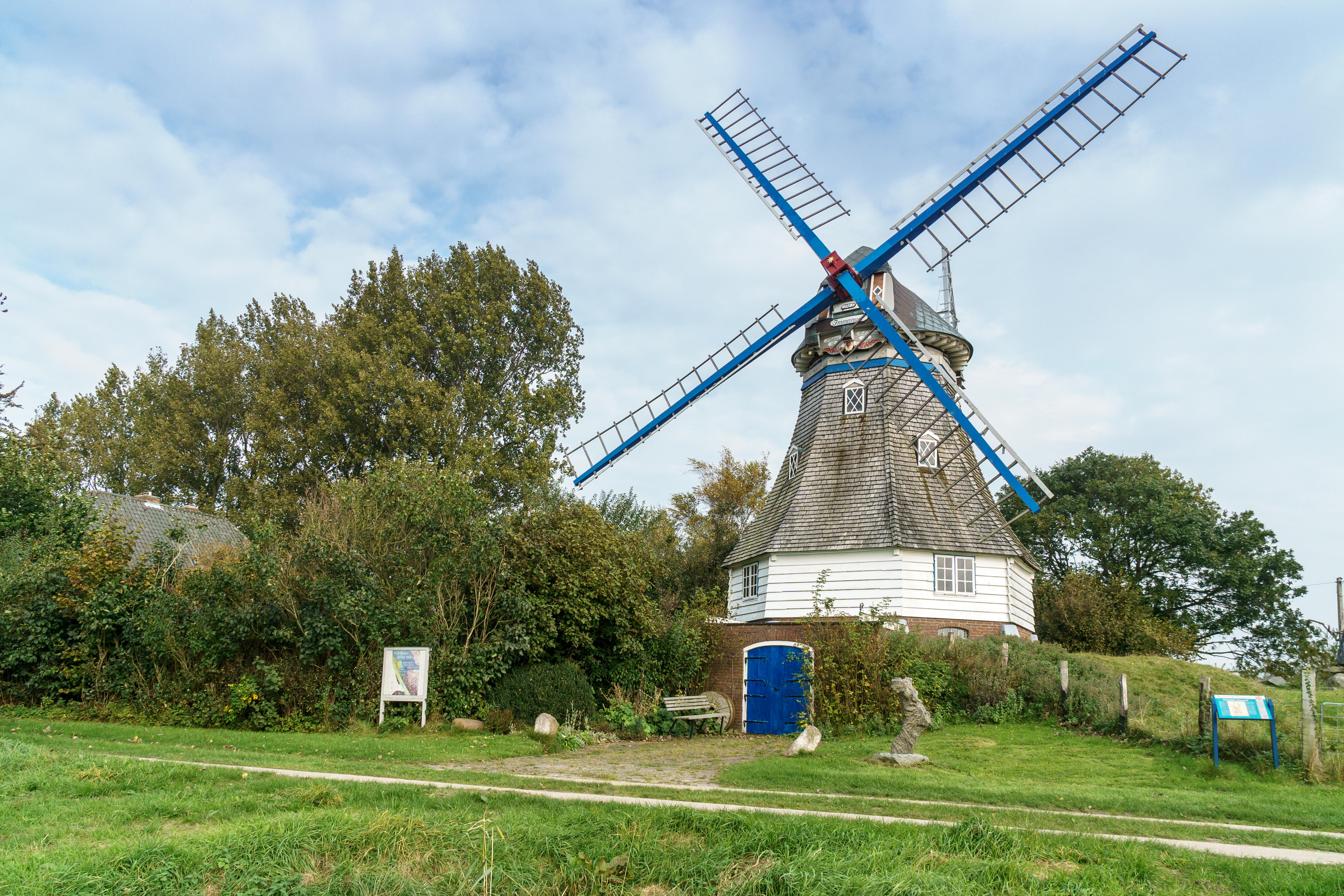

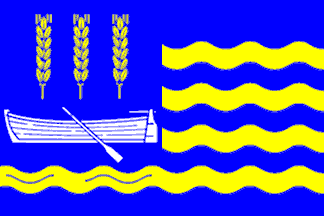
- Flag Coat of arms

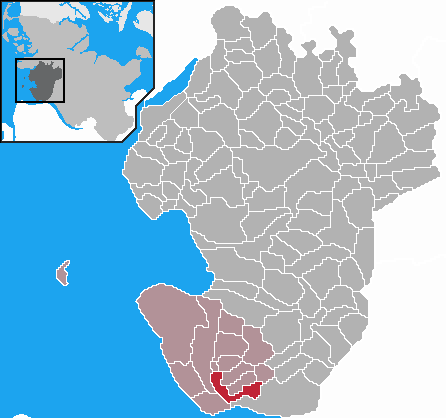
- Location of Neufeld within Dithmarschen district
- Interactive map of Neufeld
- Location within Germany Location within Schleswig-Holstein
- Coordinates: 53°54′N 9°1′E
- Country: Germany
- State: Schleswig-Holstein
- District: Dithmarschen
- Municipal assoc.: Marne-Nordsee
- Subdivisions: 5

Government
  - Mayor: Peter Reimer Janßen

Area
  - Total: 10.40 km^{2} (4.02 sq mi)
- Elevation: 2 m (6.6 ft)

Population (2025-12-31)
  - Total: 594
  - Density: 57.1/km^{2} (148/sq mi)
- Time zone: UTC+01:00 (CET)
  - Summer (DST): UTC+02:00 (CEST)
- Postal codes: 25724
- Dialling codes: 04851, 04856
- Vehicle registration: HEI
- Website: www.amt-marne-nordsee.de

Neufeld is a municipality in the district of Dithmarschen, in Schleswig-Holstein, Germany.
