= Wesselburen (Amt Kirchspielslandgemeinde) =

Coordinates: 54.217°N 8.917°E

- Former amt
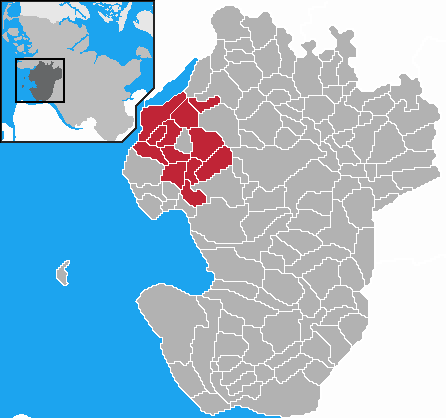
- Map of Dithmarschen highlighting Wesselburen
- Country: Germany
- State: Schleswig-Holstein
- District: Dithmarschen
- Disestablished: 25 May 2008
- Region seat: Wesselburen

Area
  - Total: 110 km^{2} (42 sq mi)

Kirchspielslandgemeinde Wesselburen was an Amt ("collective municipality") in the district of Dithmarschen, in Schleswig-Holstein, Germany. On 25 May 2008, it merged with the Amt Kirchspielslandgemeinde Büsum and the town Wesselburen to form the Amt Büsum-Wesselburen. Its seat was in Wesselburen, itself not part of the Amt.

The Amt Kirchspielslandgemeinde Wesselburen consisted of the following municipalities (with population in 2005):

1. Friedrichsgabekoog (71)
2. Hellschen-Heringsand-Unterschaar (169)
3. Hillgroven (86)
4. Norddeich (430)
5. Oesterwurth (274)
6. Reinsbüttel (427)
7. Schülp (489)
8. Strübbel (96)
9. Süderdeich (536)
10. Wesselburener Deichhausen (142)
11. Wesselburenerkoog (151)
