= Büsum (Amt Kirchspielslandgemeinde) =

Kirchspielslandgemeinde Büsum
- Amt
- Coat of arms

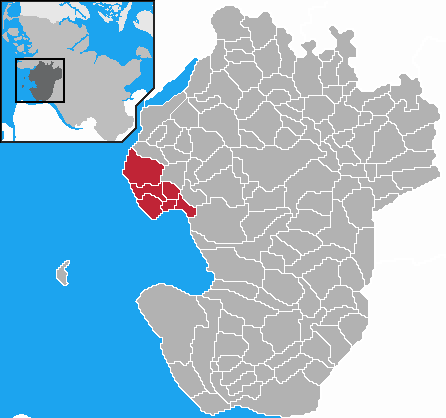
- Location of the Amt Kirchspielslandgemeinde Büsum in Dithmarschen
- Interactive map of Kirchspielslandgemeinde Büsum
- Location within Germany Location within Schleswig-Holstein
- Coordinates: 54°8′N 8°51′E
- Country: Germany
- State: Schleswig-Holstein
- District: Dithmarschen
- Disbanded: 25 May 2008
- Subdivisions: 6 municipalities

Area
  - Total: 41.73 km^{2} (16.11 sq mi)

Population (2005)
  - Total: 6,961
  - Density: 166.8/km^{2} (432.0/sq mi)
- Time zone: UTC+01:00 (CET)
  - Summer (DST): UTC+02:00 (CEST)
- Postal codes: 25761
- Dialling codes: 04834
- Vehicle registration: HEI
- Website: www.amt-buesum.de

Kirchspielslandgemeinde Büsum was an Amt ("collective municipality"), located in the district of Dithmarschen, in Schleswig-Holstein, Germany. On 25 May 2008, it merged with the Amt Kirchspielslandgemeinde Wesselburen and the town Wesselburen to form the Amt Büsum-Wesselburen. It had its seat in Büsum and consisted of the following municipalities:

- Büsum (4.880)
- Büsumer Deichhausen (345)
- Hedwigenkoog (271)
- Oesterdeichstrich (273)
- Warwerort (284)
- Westerdeichstrich (908)

(Population on September 30, 2005)

== Coat of arms ==
The coat of arms depicts Saint Clement, patron saint of sailors and fishermen and eponym of the Sankt Clemens church in Büsum.
