= Hedwigenkoog =

- Municipality
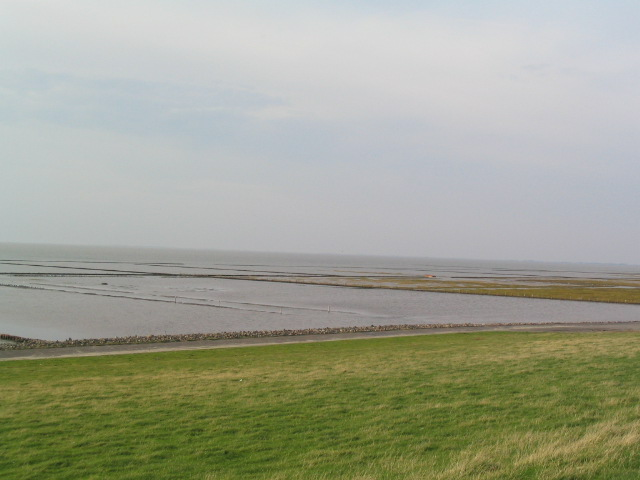
- Land reclamation from the North Sea at Hedwigenkoog

- Coat of arms

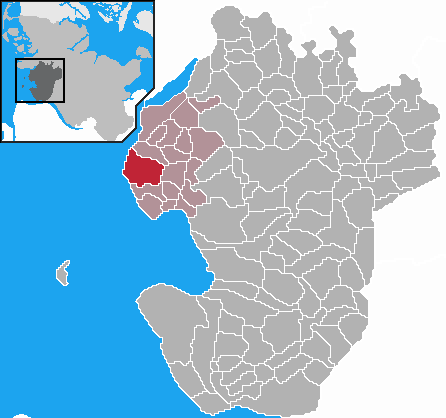
- Location of Hedwigenkoog within Dithmarschen district
- Interactive map of Hedwigenkoog
- Location within Germany Location within Schleswig-Holstein
- Coordinates: 54°11′N 8°50′E
- Country: Germany
- State: Schleswig-Holstein
- District: Dithmarschen
- Municipal assoc.: Büsum-Wesselburen

Government
  - Mayor: Klaus Nicolay

Area
  - Total: 16.36 km^{2} (6.32 sq mi)
- Elevation: 0 m (0 ft)

Population (2025-12-31)
  - Total: 186
  - Density: 11.4/km^{2} (29.4/sq mi)
- Time zone: UTC+01:00 (CET)
  - Summer (DST): UTC+02:00 (CEST)
- Postal codes: 25761
- Dialling codes: 04833, 04834
- Vehicle registration: HEI
- Website: www.amt-buesum.de

Hedwigenkoog (German pronunciation: [ˈheːtvɪɡn̩ˌkoːk], lit. 'Hedwig’s Koog') is a municipality belonging to the Amt ("collective municipality") Büsum-Wesselburen in the district Dithmarschen in Schleswig-Holstein, Germany.

Hedwigenkoog is situated on the North Sea coast north of Büsum and Westerdeichstrich. It consists of 1600ha of marshland reclaimed from the sea (called a Koog in German) and protected with a dike in 1696 to secure the land connection between Büsum and Wesselburen. The first part of its name was adopted in honor of Hedvig Sophia of Sweden, wife of Duke Frederick IV of Schleswig-Holstein-Gottorp.

The coat of arms is a modified version of the duke's seal and shows a swan holding an eel. The animals in the original version were a stork and a snake; the eel refers to Ahlen.

Hedwigenkoog's economy is based on farming including organic farming and wind energy in combination with tourism. In recent years tourism was a growing industry, with some farms offering bed and breakfast facilities, farm shops and cafes.
