= Büsum-Wesselburen =

- Amt
- Flag Coat of arms

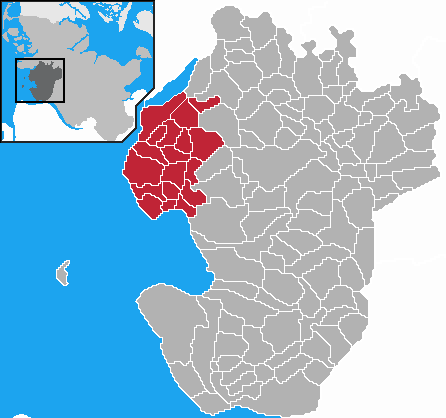
- Map of Dithmarschen highlighting Büsum-Wesselburen
- Interactive map of Büsum-Wesselburen
- Location within Germany Location within Schleswig-Holstein
- Coordinates: 54°13′N 8°55′E
- Country: Germany
- State: Schleswig-Holstein
- District: Dithmarschen
- Founded: 2008
- Seat: Wesselburen
- Subdivisions: 18 municipalities

Government
  - Mayor: Wilhelm Hollmann

Area
  - Total: 143.97 km^{2} (55.59 sq mi)

Population (2025-12-31)
  - Total: 12,810
  - Density: 88.98/km^{2} (230.4/sq mi)
- Time zone: UTC+01:00 (CET)
  - Summer (DST): UTC+02:00 (CEST)
- Website: amt-buesum-wesselburen.de

Büsum-Wesselburen is an Amt ("collective municipality") in the district of Dithmarschen, in Schleswig-Holstein, Germany. Its seat is in Büsum. It was formed on 25 May 2008 from the former Ämter Kirchspielslandgemeinde Büsum, Kirchspielslandgemeinde Wesselburen and the town Wesselburen.

The Amt Büsum-Wesselburen consists of the following municipalities:

1. Büsum
2. Büsumer Deichhausen
3. Friedrichsgabekoog
4. Hedwigenkoog
5. Hellschen-Heringsand-Unterschaar
6. Hillgroven
7. Norddeich
8. Oesterdeichstrich
9. Oesterwurth
10. Reinsbüttel
11. Schülp
12. Strübbel
13. Süderdeich
14. Warwerort
15. Wesselburen
16. Wesselburener Deichhausen
17. Wesselburenerkoog
18. Westerdeichstrich
