= Warwerort =

- Municipality
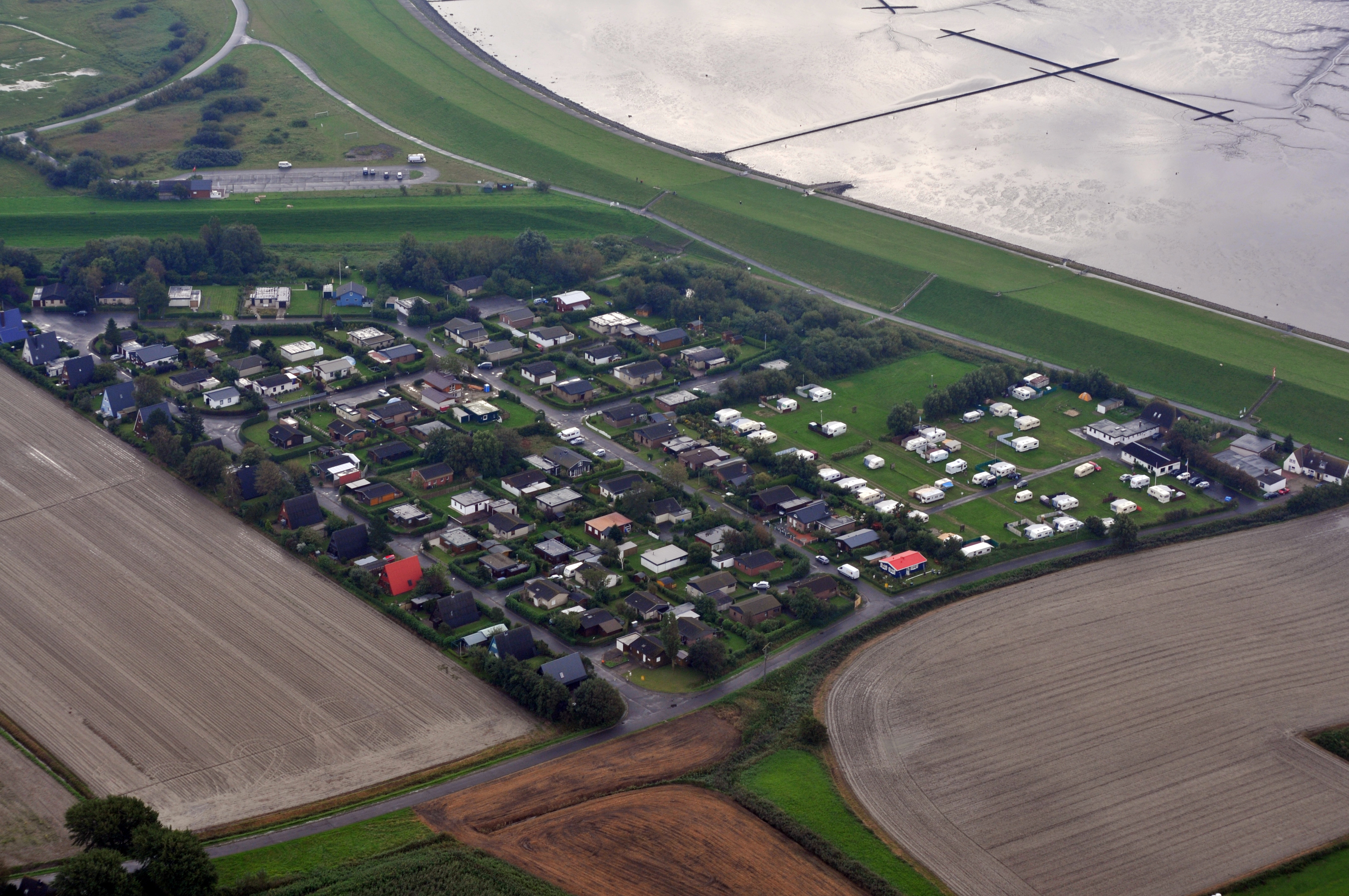

- Coat of arms

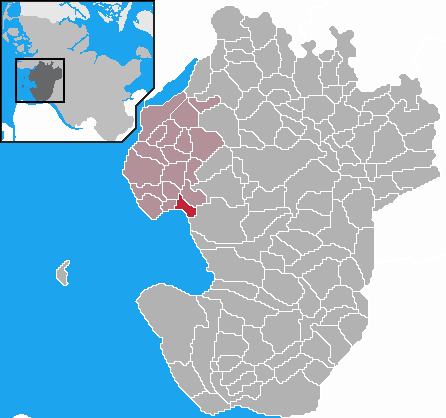
- Location of Warwerort within Dithmarschen district
- Interactive map of Warwerort
- Location within Germany Location within Schleswig-Holstein
- Coordinates: 54°9′N 8°54′E
- Country: Germany
- State: Schleswig-Holstein
- District: Dithmarschen
- Municipal assoc.: Büsum-Wesselburen

Government
  - Mayor: Karl-Heinz von Postel

Area
  - Total: 4.58 km^{2} (1.77 sq mi)
- Elevation: 0 m (0 ft)

Population (2025-12-31)
  - Total: 218
  - Density: 47.6/km^{2} (123/sq mi)
- Time zone: UTC+01:00 (CET)
  - Summer (DST): UTC+02:00 (CEST)
- Postal codes: 25761
- Dialling codes: 04834
- Vehicle registration: HEI
- Website: www.amt-buesum.de

Warwerort is a municipality in the Amt ("collective municipality") Büsum-Wesselburen in the district Dithmarschen in Schleswig-Holstein, Germany.

Warwerort is located along the north coast of the Meldorf Bight east of Büsum and Büsumer Deichhausen. The name is a combination of the old village of Werven/Warven and Ort (place). Werven originally was located south of Warverort and depicted on maps of the island Büsum as early as 1559. It sank completely during devastating storm tides in 1717 and 1718.

The Wehl behind the dike in Warwerort serves as another flood reminder. It formed where the sea washed out the soil after a dike break and left a brackish lake on the landside of the dike. Warwerort's harbor became dysfunctional when the dike around the Speicherkoog (build between 1969 and 1978) to the southeast blocked its access to the North Sea.
