= West Coast, Germany =

North Sea coast of continental Europe

The term West Coast (German: Westküste) in Germany refers to the North Sea coast of continental Europe, including the following regions:

Denmark

- Northern Jutland (Nordjylland)
- Northwest Jutland (Nordvestjylland)
- West Jutland (Vestjylland)
- Southwest Jutland (Sydvestjylland)

Germany

- North Schleswig (Nordschleswig), Germany
- North Frisia (Nordfriesland) (in Southern Schleswig or Südschleswig)
- Dithmarschen
- Weser-Ems region
- East Frisia (Ostfriesland)

Netherlands

- Frisia (Dutch: Friesland, German: Westfriesland)
- Groningen (Groningen)
