= West Coast University of Applied Sciences =

FH Westküste University of Applied Sciences
- Fachhochschule Westküste
- Type: public university
- Established: 1993
- Affiliations: Fachhochschule Flensburg
- President: Anja Wollesen
- Administrative staff: ~ 200
- Students: 1,980 (2019)
- Location: FH Westküste, Fritz-Tiedemann-Ring 20, 25746 Heide, Germany, Heide, Schleswig-Holstein, Germany; 54.1953°N 9.1217°E
- Website: http://www.fh-westkueste.de

The FH Westküste University of Applied Sciences (German Fachhochschule Westküste) is a vocational university of higher education and applied research located in the city of Heide in the Federal State of Schleswig-Holstein. With an enrollment of approximately 1,980 students as of 2019, the university offers a range of bachelor's and master's programs across two main faculties: the Faculty of Technology and the Faculty of Business Studies.

The campus is located in the eastern part of Heide.

== The FH Westküste of Applied Sciences ==
The FH Westküste University of Applied Sciences emphasizes areas such as Management and Tourism in its Commercial Faculty, and Automation and Electronics in its Technical Faculty. Additionally, it aims to expand interdisciplinary programs like Management and Technology to adapt to evolving industry needs.

== History ==
In 1985, regional businesses in Dithmarschen and Nord Friesland, under the Flensburg Chamber of Commerce, proposed establishing a branch of the Flensburg University of Applied Sciences on Germany's West Coast. By 1991, the state government approved the creation of a University of Applied Sciences in Heide, aiming for 1,000 study places, with an initial 500. The university commenced its first academic year on September 20, 1993, with 66 students in Business Administration, Electrical Engineering, and Mechanical Engineering, operating from rented facilities. In September 2000, it moved to a newly constructed campus at Fritz-Thiedemann-Ring 20. Over the years, the university expanded its programs, introducing courses like Management and Technology, International Tourism Management, and Economics and Law. Notably, it was the first in the state to transition to Bachelor's and master's degree structures. By the winter semester of 2014/15, enrollment had surpassed 1,500 students.

== Study Programs ==
FH Westküste University of Applied Sciences offers study programs across various disciplines.

== Research Institutes ==
FH Westküste University of Applied Sciences is home to several research institutes that focus on applied research and knowledge transfer, aiming to enhance the competitiveness of businesses and institutions in western Schleswig-Holstein and beyond.

German Institute for Tourism Research

Established in 2006 as the Institute for Management and Tourism, it was rebranded in 2020 to reflect its national prominence. The institute conducts interdisciplinary research on travel behavior, the impacts of tourism, and strategic development for destinations and institutions.

Institute "regioMAR"

The Institute for Regional Marketing Research and Consulting (regioMAR) focuses on regional marketing strategies and research. It aims to develop innovative models and methods for business operations, with a particular emphasis on tourism, marketing, and personnel management. Institute "WinHR"

The West Coast Institute for Human Resource Management (WinHR)'s activities include funded research projects, studies, and knowledge transfer through lectures, workshops, and publications, all aimed at enhancing the competitiveness of companies and institutions.

== International ==
Student Exchange Program

The university's International Office facilitates exchange opportunities for students seeking to broaden their academic and cultural horizons. For incoming students, FH Westküste provides a selection of courses taught in English each semester, along with German language courses to enhance integration. Prospective exchange students are encouraged to consult the course catalogue and reach out to the International Office for guidance.

Partner Universities

FH Westküste University of Applied Sciences maintains a network of partner universities worldwide, facilitating student and staff exchanges as well as collaborative initiatives. These partnerships span various countries, including Argentina, Australia, Austria, Colombia, the Czech Republic, Denmark, Estonia, Finland, Greece, India, Indonesia, Iran, Ireland, Latvia, Lithuania, Malaysia, Mexico, New Zealand, the Netherlands, Norway, Poland, Portugal, South Korea, Spain, Sweden, Thailand, Turkey, the United Kingdom, and the United States. This global network enriches the academic experience by offering diverse perspectives and opportunities for cross-cultural engagement.
