= Schülp, Dithmarschen =

Schülp
- Municipality
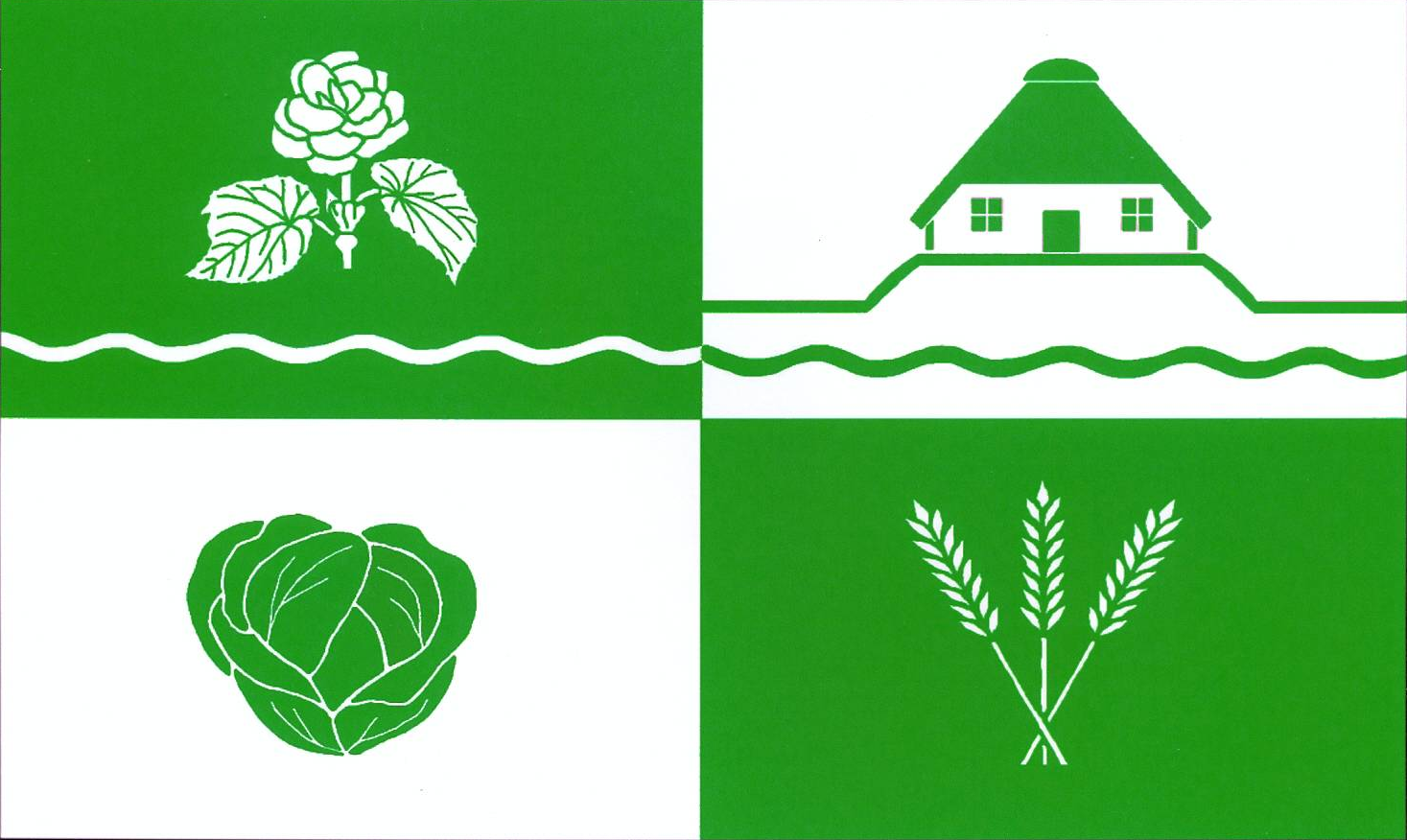
- Flag Coat of arms

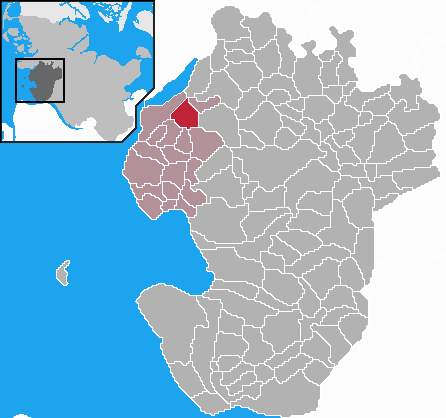
- Location of Schülp within Dithmarschen district
- Interactive map of Schülp
- Location within Germany Location within Schleswig-Holstein
- Coordinates: 54°15′N 08°55′E
- Country: Germany
- State: Schleswig-Holstein
- District: Dithmarschen
- Municipal assoc.: Büsum-Wesselburen
- Subdivisions: 5

Government
  - Mayor: Anke Friccius

Area
  - Total: 9.27 km^{2} (3.58 sq mi)
- Elevation: 0 m (0 ft)

Population (2025-12-31)
  - Total: 393
  - Density: 42.4/km^{2} (110/sq mi)
- Time zone: UTC+01:00 (CET)
  - Summer (DST): UTC+02:00 (CEST)
- Postal codes: 25764
- Dialling codes: 04833
- Vehicle registration: HEI

Schülp (German pronunciation: [ʃʏlp]) is a municipality in the district of Dithmarschen, in Schleswig-Holstein, Germany.
