= Oesterwurth =

- Municipality
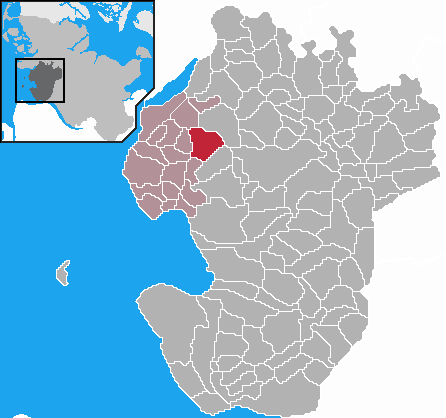
- Location of Oesterwurth within Dithmarschen district
- Interactive map of Oesterwurth
- Location within Germany Location within Schleswig-Holstein
- Coordinates: 54°13′N 8°59′E
- Country: Germany
- State: Schleswig-Holstein
- District: Dithmarschen
- Municipal assoc.: Büsum-Wesselburen
- Subdivisions: 5

Government
  - Mayor: Johann-Wilhelm Knopf

Area
  - Total: 14.19 km^{2} (5.48 sq mi)
- Elevation: 0 m (0 ft)

Population (2025-12-31)
  - Total: 242
  - Density: 17.1/km^{2} (44.2/sq mi)
- Time zone: UTC+01:00 (CET)
  - Summer (DST): UTC+02:00 (CEST)
- Postal codes: 25764
- Dialling codes: 04833
- Vehicle registration: HEI

Oesterwurth is a municipality in the district of Dithmarschen, in Schleswig-Holstein, Germany. The municipality consists of five hamlets: Jarrenwisch, Poppenwurth, Hödienwisch, Wehren and Haferwisch.

In the central place, Jarrenwisch, there is a stop on the Heide-Büsum railroad line,
