= Friedrichsgabekoog =

- Municipality
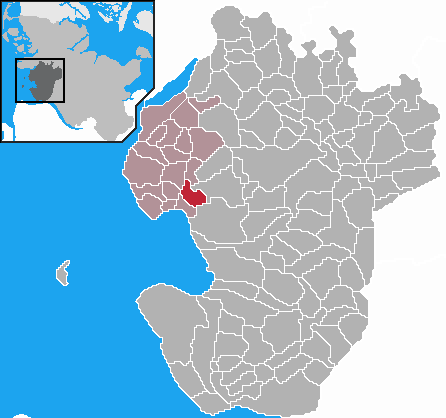
- Location of Friedrichsgabekoog within Dithmarschen district
- Interactive map of Friedrichsgabekoog
- Location within Germany Location within Schleswig-Holstein
- Coordinates: 54°09′N 08°54′E
- Country: Germany
- State: Schleswig-Holstein
- District: Dithmarschen
- Municipal assoc.: Büsum-Wesselburen

Government
  - Mayor: Paul Heinrich Dörscher

Area
  - Total: 8.62 km^{2} (3.33 sq mi)
- Elevation: 0 m (0 ft)

Population (2025-12-31)
  - Total: 51
  - Density: 5.9/km^{2} (15/sq mi)
- Time zone: UTC+01:00 (CET)
  - Summer (DST): UTC+02:00 (CEST)
- Postal codes: 25764
- Dialling codes: 04833, 04834 u. 04839
- Vehicle registration: HEI

Friedrichsgabekoog (German pronunciation: [ˈfʁiːdʁɪçsɡaːbəˌkoːk], lit. 'Koog of Frederick’s Gift') is a municipality in the district of Dithmarschen, in Schleswig-Holstein, Germany.
