= Hellschen-Heringsand-Unterschaar =

- Municipality
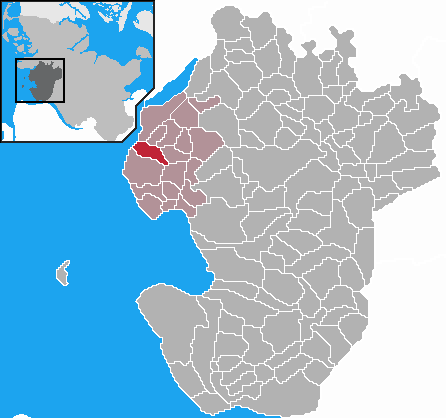
- Location of Hellschen-Heringsand-Unterschaar within Dithmarschen district
- Interactive map of Hellschen-Heringsand-Unterschaar
- Location within Germany Location within Schleswig-Holstein
- Coordinates: 54°12′N 8°51′E
- Country: Germany
- State: Schleswig-Holstein
- District: Dithmarschen
- Municipal assoc.: Büsum-Wesselburen

Government
  - Mayor: Bernd Blohm

Area
  - Total: 7.02 km^{2} (2.71 sq mi)
- Elevation: 2 m (6.6 ft)

Population (2025-12-31)
  - Total: 159
  - Density: 22.6/km^{2} (58.7/sq mi)
- Time zone: UTC+01:00 (CET)
  - Summer (DST): UTC+02:00 (CEST)
- Postal codes: 25764
- Dialling codes: 04833
- Vehicle registration: HEI

Hellschen-Heringsand-Unterschaar (German pronunciation: [ˈhɛlʃn̩ ˈheːʁɪŋzant ˈʔʊntɐʃaːɐ̯]) is a municipality in the district of Dithmarschen, in Schleswig-Holstein, Germany. It is the municipality with the longest name in the country.
