= Büsumer Deichhausen =

- Municipality
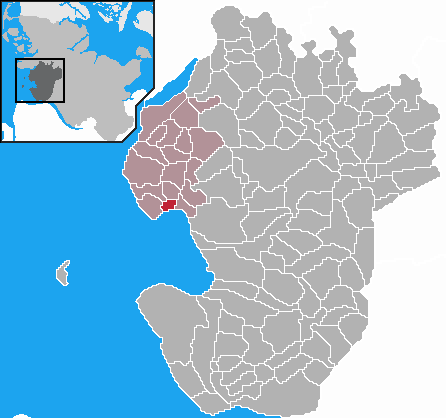
- Location of Büsumer Deichhausen in Dithmarschen
- Interactive map of Büsumer Deichhausen
- Location within Germany Location within Schleswig-Holstein
- Coordinates: 54°8′N 8°53′E
- Country: Germany
- State: Schleswig-Holstein
- District: Dithmarschen
- Municipal assoc.: Büsum-Wesselburen

Government
  - Mayor: Helmut Rolfs

Area
  - Total: 2.87 km^{2} (1.11 sq mi)
- Elevation: 0 m (0 ft)

Population (2025-12-31)
  - Total: 365
  - Density: 127/km^{2} (329/sq mi)
- Time zone: UTC+01:00 (CET)
  - Summer (DST): UTC+02:00 (CEST)
- Postal codes: 25761
- Dialling codes: 04834
- Vehicle registration: HEI
- Website: www.amt-buesum-wesselburen.de

Büsumer Deichhausen (German pronunciation: [ˌbyːzʊmɐ daɪçˈhaʊzn̩], lit. 'Büsum Dike Settlement'; formerly "Dykhusen") is a municipality belonging to the Amt ("collective municipality") Büsum-Wesselburen in the district Dithmarschen in Schleswig-Holstein, Germany.

Büsumer Deichhausen is situated on the North Sea coast of the Meldorf Bight just east of Büsum. Its name is derived from the words Deich/Dyk (dike) and Haus/Hus (house). It is called Büsumer Deichhausen to distinguish it from the municipality Wesselburener Deichhausen. Its economy is based on a mix of farming and tourism.
