= Norddeich (Dithmarschen) =

- Municipality
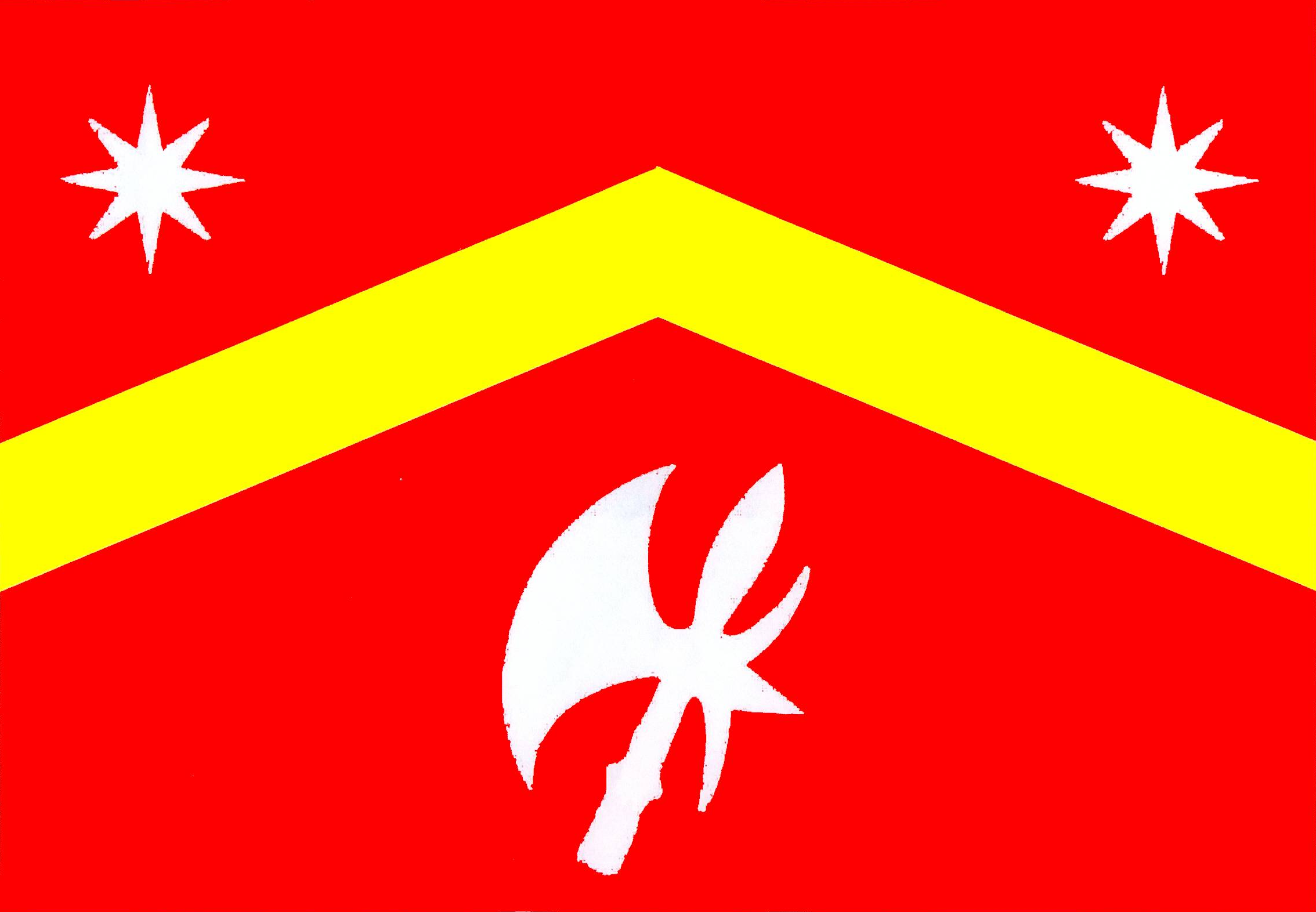
- Flag Coat of arms

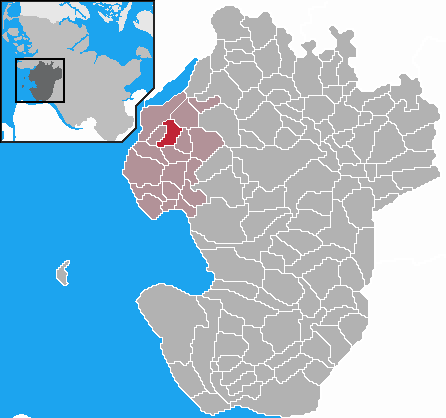
- Location of Norddeich within Dithmarschen district
- Interactive map of Norddeich
- Location within Germany Location within Schleswig-Holstein
- Coordinates: 54°13′N 8°54′E
- Country: Germany
- State: Schleswig-Holstein
- District: Dithmarschen
- Municipal assoc.: Büsum-Wesselburen
- Subdivisions: 3

Government
  - Mayor: Ulf Jacobsen

Area
  - Total: 6.9 km^{2} (2.7 sq mi)
- Elevation: 2 m (6.6 ft)

Population (2025-12-31)
  - Total: 419
  - Density: 61/km^{2} (160/sq mi)
- Time zone: UTC+01:00 (CET)
  - Summer (DST): UTC+02:00 (CEST)
- Postal codes: 25764
- Dialling codes: 04833
- Vehicle registration: HEI
- Website: www.norddeich-sh.de

Norddeich (German pronunciation: [ˈnɔʁtdaɪç], lit. 'North Dike', in contrast to "South Dike") is a municipality in the district of Dithmarschen, in Schleswig-Holstein, Germany.
