= Wesselburenerkoog =

- Municipality
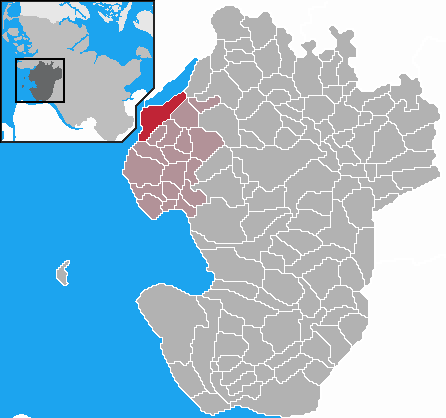
- Location of Wesselburenerkoog within Dithmarschen district
- Interactive map of Wesselburenerkoog
- Location within Germany Location within Schleswig-Holstein
- Coordinates: 54°15′N 8°53′E
- Country: Germany
- State: Schleswig-Holstein
- District: Dithmarschen
- Municipal assoc.: Büsum-Wesselburen
- Subdivisions: 2

Government
  - Mayor: Eggert Wilkens

Area
  - Total: 21.88 km^{2} (8.45 sq mi)
- Elevation: 0 m (0 ft)

Population (2025-12-31)
  - Total: 152
  - Density: 6.95/km^{2} (18.0/sq mi)
- Time zone: UTC+01:00 (CET)
  - Summer (DST): UTC+02:00 (CEST)
- Postal codes: 25764
- Dialling codes: 04833
- Vehicle registration: HEI

Wesselburenerkoog is a municipality in the district of Dithmarschen, in Schleswig-Holstein, Germany.
