= Süderdeich =

- Municipality
- Coat of arms

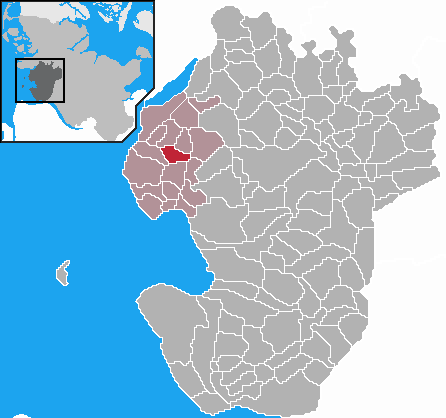
- Location of Süderdeich within Dithmarschen district
- Interactive map of Süderdeich
- Location within Germany Location within Schleswig-Holstein
- Coordinates: 54°12′N 8°54′E
- Country: Germany
- State: Schleswig-Holstein
- District: Dithmarschen
- Municipal assoc.: Büsum-Wesselburen
- Subdivisions: 2

Government
  - Mayor: Eggert Wollatz

Area
  - Total: 6.64 km^{2} (2.56 sq mi)
- Elevation: 0 m (0 ft)

Population (2025-12-31)
  - Total: 439
  - Density: 66.1/km^{2} (171/sq mi)
- Time zone: UTC+01:00 (CET)
  - Summer (DST): UTC+02:00 (CEST)
- Postal codes: 25764
- Dialling codes: 04833
- Vehicle registration: HEI

Süderdeich (German pronunciation: [ˈzyːdɐdaɪç], lit. 'South Dike', in contrast to "North Dike") is a municipality in the district of Dithmarschen, in Schleswig-Holstein, Germany.
