= Westerdeichstrich =

- Municipality
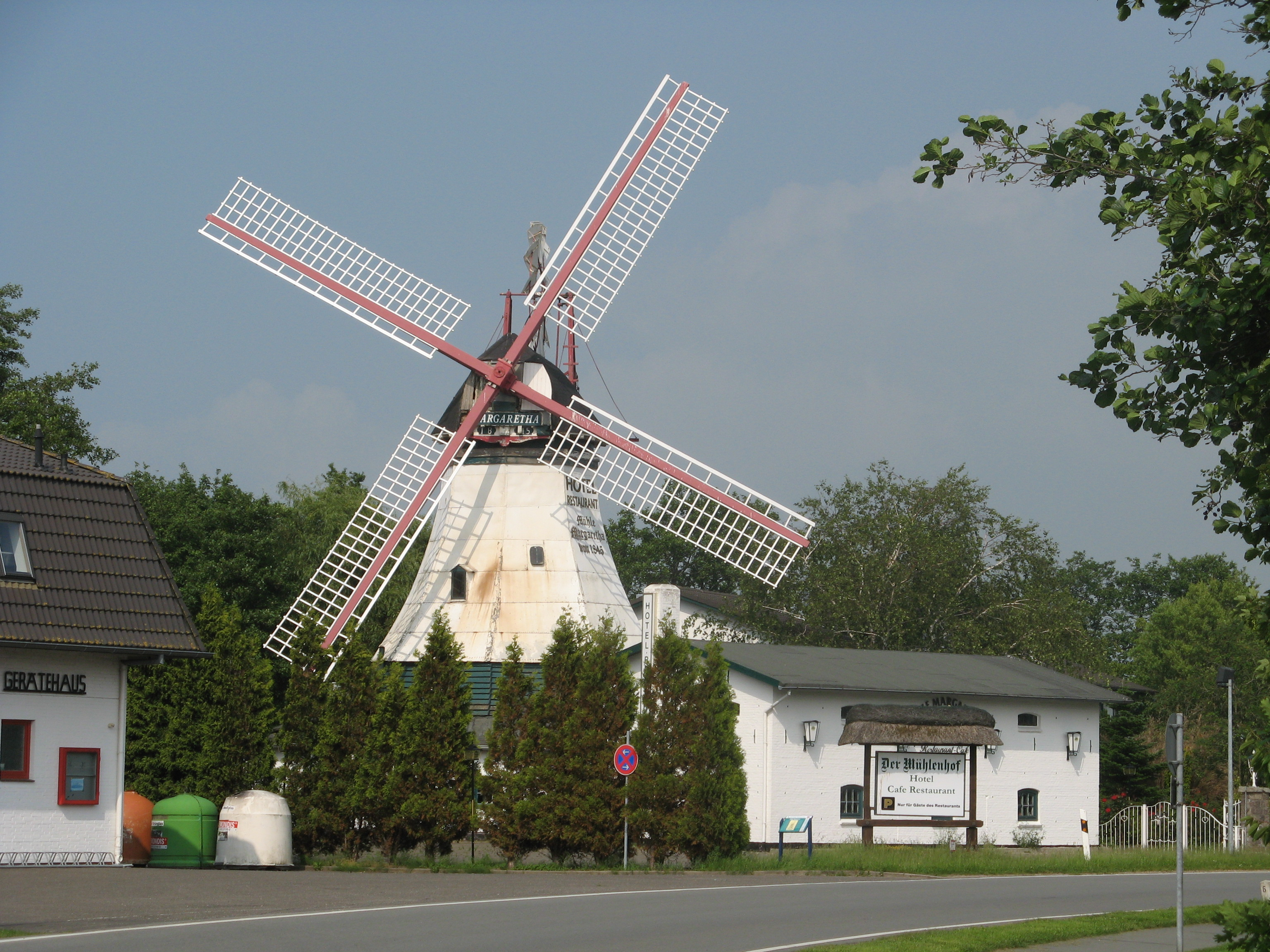

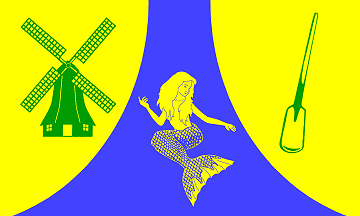
- Flag Coat of arms

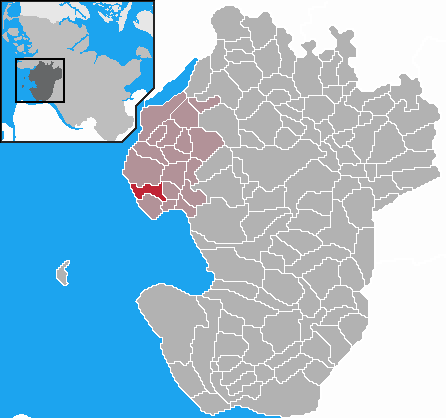
- Location of Westerdeichstrich within Dithmarschen district
- Interactive map of Westerdeichstrich
- Location within Germany Location within Schleswig-Holstein
- Coordinates: 54°10′N 8°52′E
- Country: Germany
- State: Schleswig-Holstein
- District: Dithmarschen
- Municipal assoc.: Büsum-Wesselburen

Government
  - Mayor: Hans-Hermann Warnsholdt

Area
  - Total: 7.48 km^{2} (2.89 sq mi)
- Elevation: 0 m (0 ft)

Population (2025-12-31)
  - Total: 770
  - Density: 100/km^{2} (270/sq mi)
- Time zone: UTC+01:00 (CET)
  - Summer (DST): UTC+02:00 (CEST)
- Postal codes: 25761
- Dialling codes: 04834
- Vehicle registration: HEI
- Website: www.amt-buesum.de

Westerdeichstrich is a municipality belonging to the Amt ("collective municipality") Büsum-Wesselburen in the district Dithmarschen in Schleswig-Holstein on the West Coast of Germany. It consists of the parts Westerdeichstrich, Groven, Augustenhof and Stinteck.

Westerdeichstrich is located at the North Sea coast north of Büsum and west of the old dam which connected Büsum with the mainland in 1585. The first documented mention of Westerdeichstrich was in 1824. Its economy is based on a mix between farming and tourism. The most notable building in Westerdeichstrich is its windmill "Margaretha" from 1845, now serving as a restaurant. The mill is also featured in the coat of arms, alongside a spade in reference to dike building and a mermaid in reference to the importance of tourism for the town.
