= Oesterdeichstrich =

- Municipality
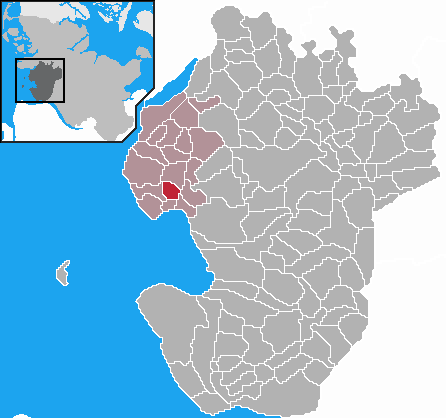
- Location of Oesterdeichstrich within Dithmarschen district
- Interactive map of Oesterdeichstrich
- Location within Germany Location within Schleswig-Holstein
- Coordinates: 54°9′N 8°52′E
- Country: Germany
- State: Schleswig-Holstein
- District: Dithmarschen
- Municipal assoc.: Büsum-Wesselburen

Government
  - Mayor: Wilhelm Hollmann

Area
  - Total: 4.64 km^{2} (1.79 sq mi)
- Elevation: 0 m (0 ft)

Population (2025-12-31)
  - Total: 213
  - Density: 45.9/km^{2} (119/sq mi)
- Time zone: UTC+01:00 (CET)
  - Summer (DST): UTC+02:00 (CEST)
- Postal codes: 25761
- Dialling codes: 04834
- Vehicle registration: HEI

Oesterdeichstrich is a municipality belonging to the Amt ("collective municipality") Büsum-Wesselburen in the district Dithmarschen in Schleswig-Holstein, Germany.

Oesterdeichstrich is a rural area situated directly east of the dike that connected Büsum with the mainland in 1585, hence its name (Oester/Ost = east, Deich = dike). This municipality includes the airport Heide-Büsum from where the airline Ostfriesische Lufttransport GmbH serves a flight connection to Helgoland.
