= Strübbel =

- Municipality
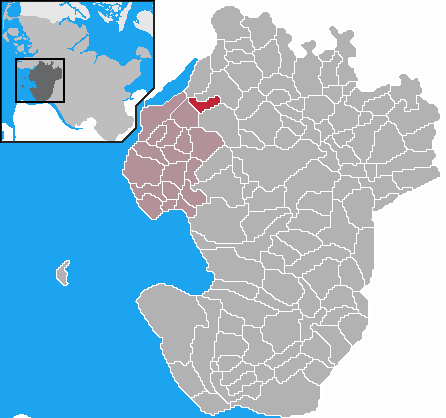
- Location of Strübbel within Dithmarschen district
- Interactive map of Strübbel
- Location within Germany Location within Schleswig-Holstein
- Coordinates: 54°16′N 08°58′E
- Country: Germany
- State: Schleswig-Holstein
- District: Dithmarschen
- Municipal assoc.: Büsum-Wesselburen

Government
  - Mayor: Dierk Claußen

Area
  - Total: 4.4 km^{2} (1.7 sq mi)
- Elevation: 2 m (6.6 ft)

Population (2025-12-31)
  - Total: 83
  - Density: 19/km^{2} (49/sq mi)
- Time zone: UTC+01:00 (CET)
  - Summer (DST): UTC+02:00 (CEST)
- Postal codes: 25792
- Dialling codes: 04837
- Vehicle registration: HEI

Strübbel (German pronunciation: [ˈʃtʁʏbl̩]) is a municipality in the district of Dithmarschen, in Schleswig-Holstein, Germany.
