= Reinsbüttel =

- Municipality
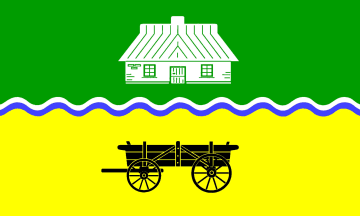
- Flag Coat of arms

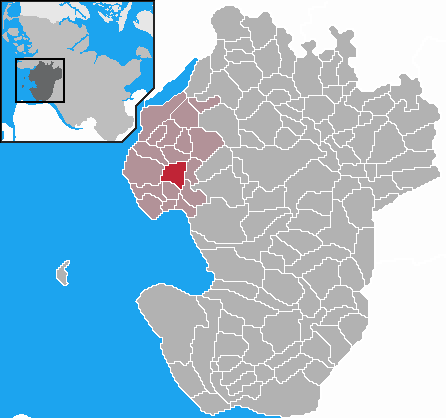
- Location of Reinsbüttel within Dithmarschen district
- Interactive map of Reinsbüttel
- Location within Germany Location within Schleswig-Holstein
- Coordinates: 54°11′N 8°55′E
- Country: Germany
- State: Schleswig-Holstein
- District: Dithmarschen
- Municipal assoc.: Büsum-Wesselburen
- Subdivisions: 4

Government
  - Mayor: Dirk Rathje

Area
  - Total: 6.83 km^{2} (2.64 sq mi)
- Elevation: 2 m (6.6 ft)

Population (2025-12-31)
  - Total: 403
  - Density: 59.0/km^{2} (153/sq mi)
- Time zone: UTC+01:00 (CET)
  - Summer (DST): UTC+02:00 (CEST)
- Postal codes: 25764
- Dialling codes: 04833
- Vehicle registration: HEI
- Website: www.reinsbuettel.de

Reinsbüttel (German pronunciation: [ˈʁaɪnsbʏtl̩]) is a municipality in the district of Dithmarschen, in Schleswig-Holstein, Germany.
