= Wesselburener Deichhausen =

- Municipality
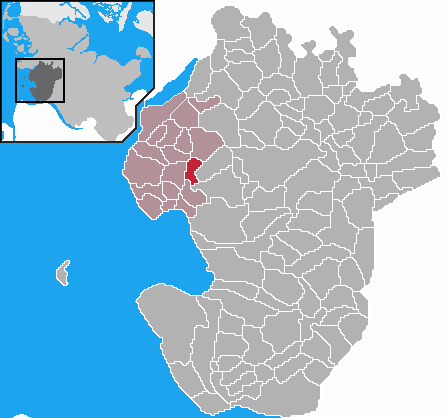
- Location of Wesselburener Deichhausen within Dithmarschen district
- Interactive map of Wesselburener Deichhausen
- Location within Germany Location within Schleswig-Holstein
- Coordinates: 54°10′N 8°56′E
- Country: Germany
- State: Schleswig-Holstein
- District: Dithmarschen
- Municipal assoc.: Büsum-Wesselburen

Government
  - Mayor: Reimer Jürgens

Area
  - Total: 5.07 km^{2} (1.96 sq mi)
- Elevation: 0 m (0 ft)

Population (2025-12-31)
  - Total: 110
  - Density: 22/km^{2} (56/sq mi)
- Time zone: UTC+01:00 (CET)
  - Summer (DST): UTC+02:00 (CEST)
- Postal codes: 25764
- Dialling codes: 04833
- Vehicle registration: HEI

Wesselburener Deichhausen is a municipality in the district of Dithmarschen, in Schleswig-Holstein, Germany.
