= Dithmarschen =

Coordinates: 54°05′N 9°05′E

- District
- Flag Coat of arms

- Country: Germany
- State: Schleswig-Holstein
- Capital: Heide

Government
  - District admin.: Stefan Mohrdieck

Area
  - Total: 1,405 km^{2} (542 sq mi)

Population (31 December 2025)
  - Total: 133,405
  - Density: 94.95/km^{2} (245.9/sq mi)
- Time zone: UTC+01:00 (CET)
  - Summer (DST): UTC+02:00 (CEST)
- Vehicle registration: HEI, MED
- Website: dithmarschen.de

Dithmarschen (German: [ˈdɪtmaʁʃn̩], Low Saxon: [ˈdɪtmaːʃn̩]; archaic English: Ditmarsh; Danish: Ditmarsken; Medieval Latin: Tedmarsgo) is a district in Schleswig-Holstein, Germany. It is bounded by (from the north and clockwise) the districts of Nordfriesland, Schleswig-Flensburg, Rendsburg-Eckernförde, and Steinburg, by the state of Lower Saxony (district of Stade, from which it is separated by the Elbe river), and by the North Sea.

From the 13th century up to 1559 Dithmarschen was an independent peasant republic within the Holy Roman Empire and a member of the Hanseatic League. It repulsed attempts by larger fiefs to annex it, whether physically (as with the invasions by Holstein in 1319 and 1404 or Denmark in 1500) or legally (as with their successful court battle against Holstein in 1474–1481). Dithmarschen was recognized as an imperial fief by the emperor, who summoned the peasants to send representatives to royal assemblies and the Imperial Diet. Its heyday was from the consolidation of its government in 1447 to its final conquest by the King of Denmark in 1559, though the Danish were still compelled to leave Dithmarschen with a considerable degree of autonomy.

== Geography ==
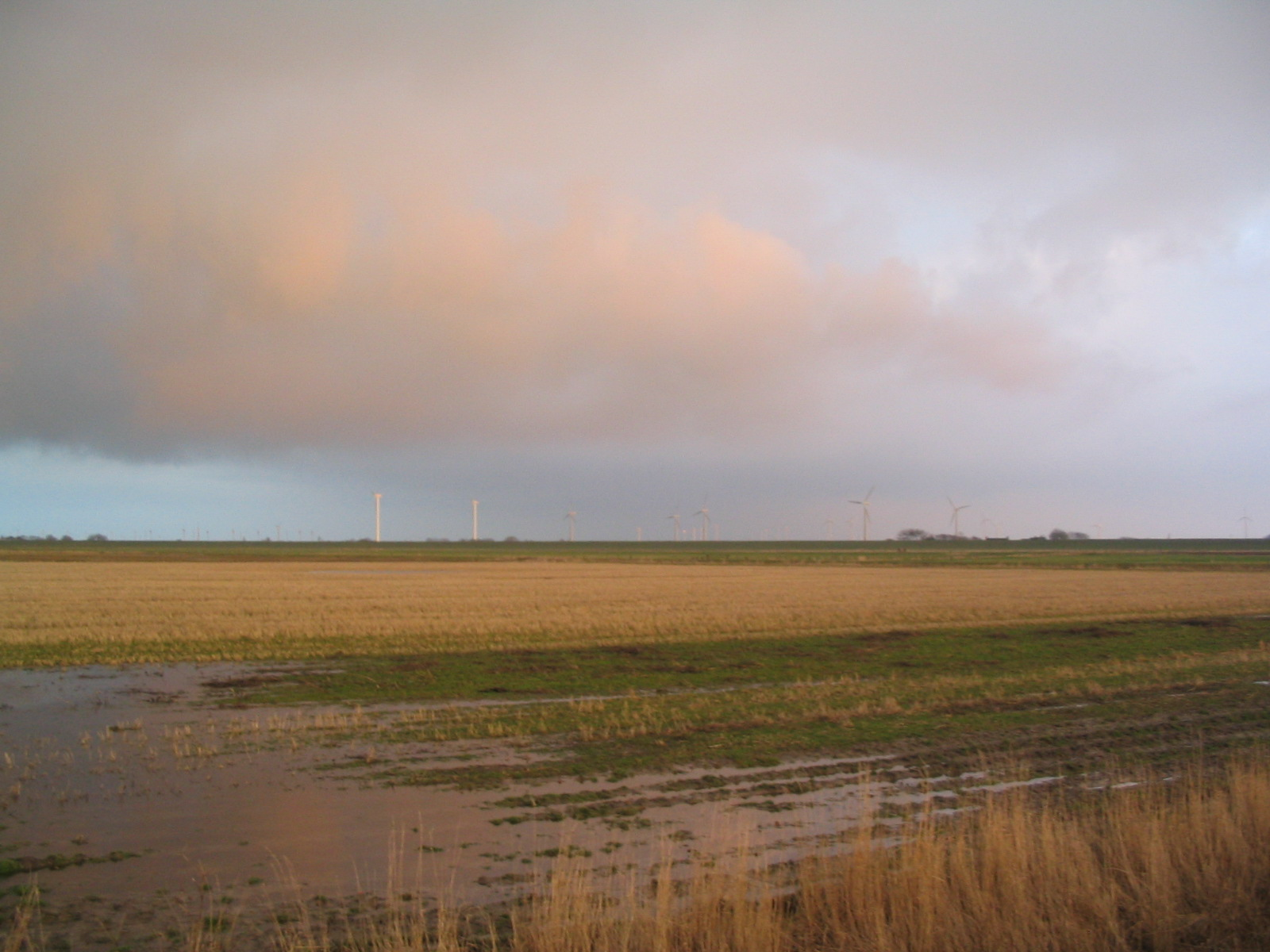
Marshland in northern Dithmarschen

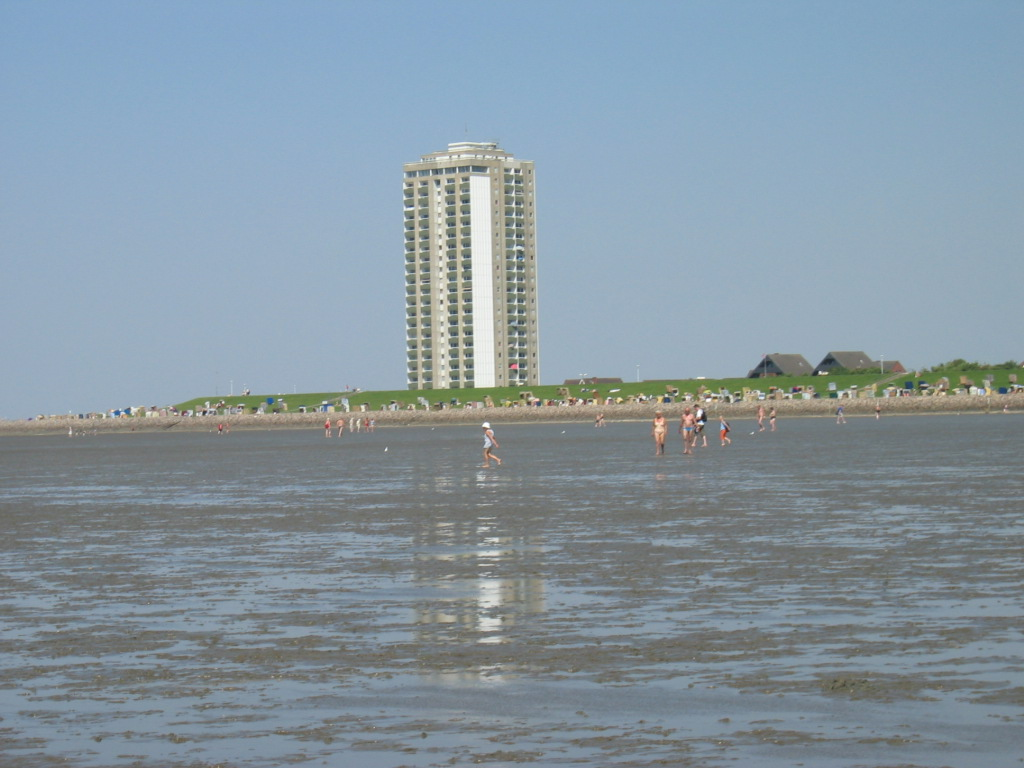
Wadden Sea at Büsum

The district is located on the North Sea. It is embraced by the Elbe estuary to the south and the Eider estuary to the north. Today it forms a kind of artificial island, surrounded by the Eider river in the north and the Kiel Canal in both the east and southeast. It is a rather flat countryside that was once full of fens and swamps.

To the north it borders on Nordfriesland and Schleswig-Flensburg, to the east on Rendsburg-Eckernförde, and in the southeast on Steinburg. Its landward boundaries have remained basically the same since the times of Charlemagne. Land reclamation, however, has almost doubled the size of Dithmarschen as land has been wrested from the sea.

The main roads and rail lines in Schleswig-Holstein follow a north–south direction, making Hamburg its most accessible city. Exemplary is the most important railway line in the district, the Marsh Railway, and the main roads, Bundesautobahn 23 and Bundesstraße 5

The district has a maximum north–south length of 54 kilometers and an east–west length of 41 kilometers. The highest point, near Schrum in the geestland, is 78 metres (256 ft) above sea level and the lowest point, near Burg, is 0.5 metres (1 ft 8 in) below sea level.

Dithmarschen's landscape owes its character to the North Sea. From west to east Dithmarschen consists of the Wadden Sea, marshes, bogs, and the geestland. The North Sea had a higher sea level 6,500 years ago than today and the coastline then ran along the geestland. About 4,500 years ago, geestland structures were connected by sand and gravel depositions that formed spits. Bogs, lakes, and swamps emerged as the area behind the spits no longer flooded. After the first plants (glasswort) took root, the land transformed first to salt marshes and finally to marshes. These marshes rank among the most fertile of Germany's soils. Vegetable farming in Dithmarschen produces the highest yields in Schleswig-Holstein.

Since about the 8th century, the people of Dithmarschen have been living on warfts for protection from the sea. In the 12th century, they began building dikes to protect their pastures and fields. Since about the 15th century, they have been reclaiming land from the sea.

=== Flora and fauna ===
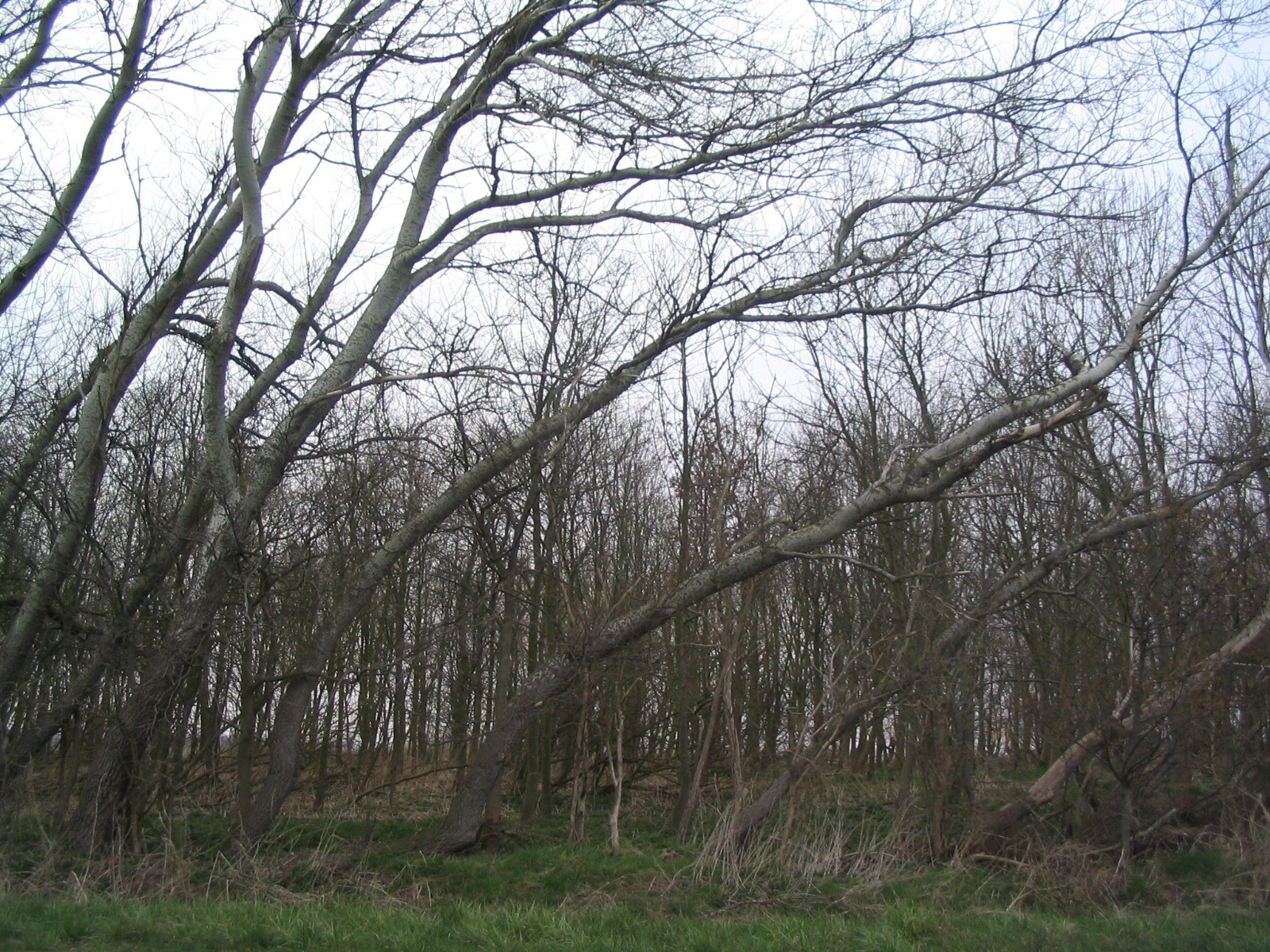
Wind influences tree growth

While the Geest has some woods, trees are found in marshlands only in the form of wind protection around houses or villages. Traditional are the Knicks: tree rows with strong undergrowth to protect agricultural land from the wind.

Several bogs are present in Dithmarschen. A special position is taken by the "Weißes Moor" (White bog), the only bog still existing in a quite-natural shape in the Schleswig-Holstein marsh land.

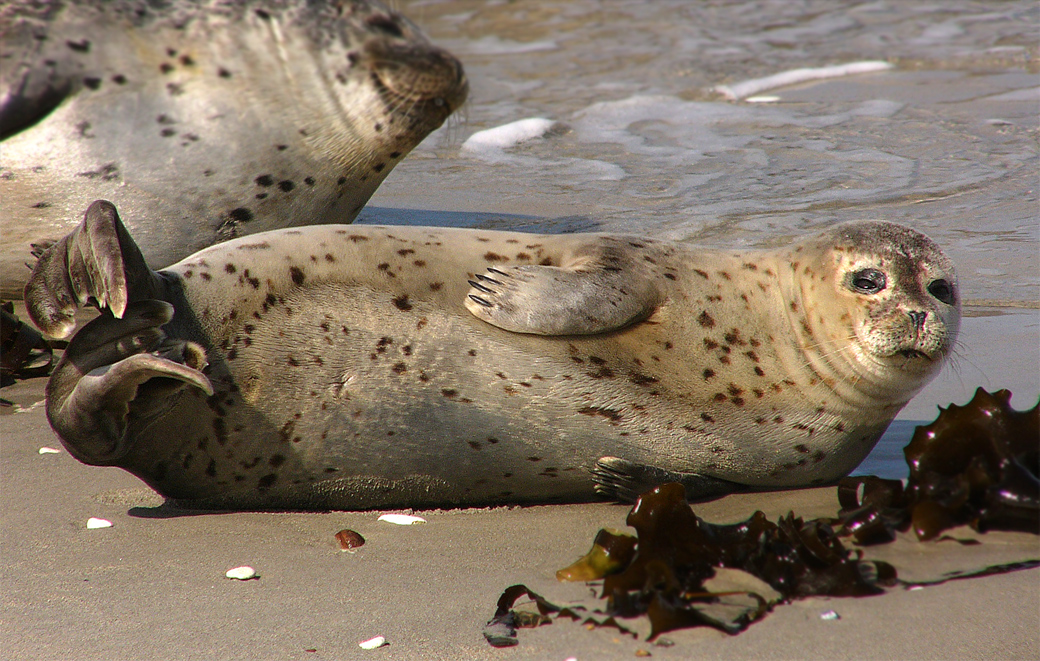
Common seal on a sand bank

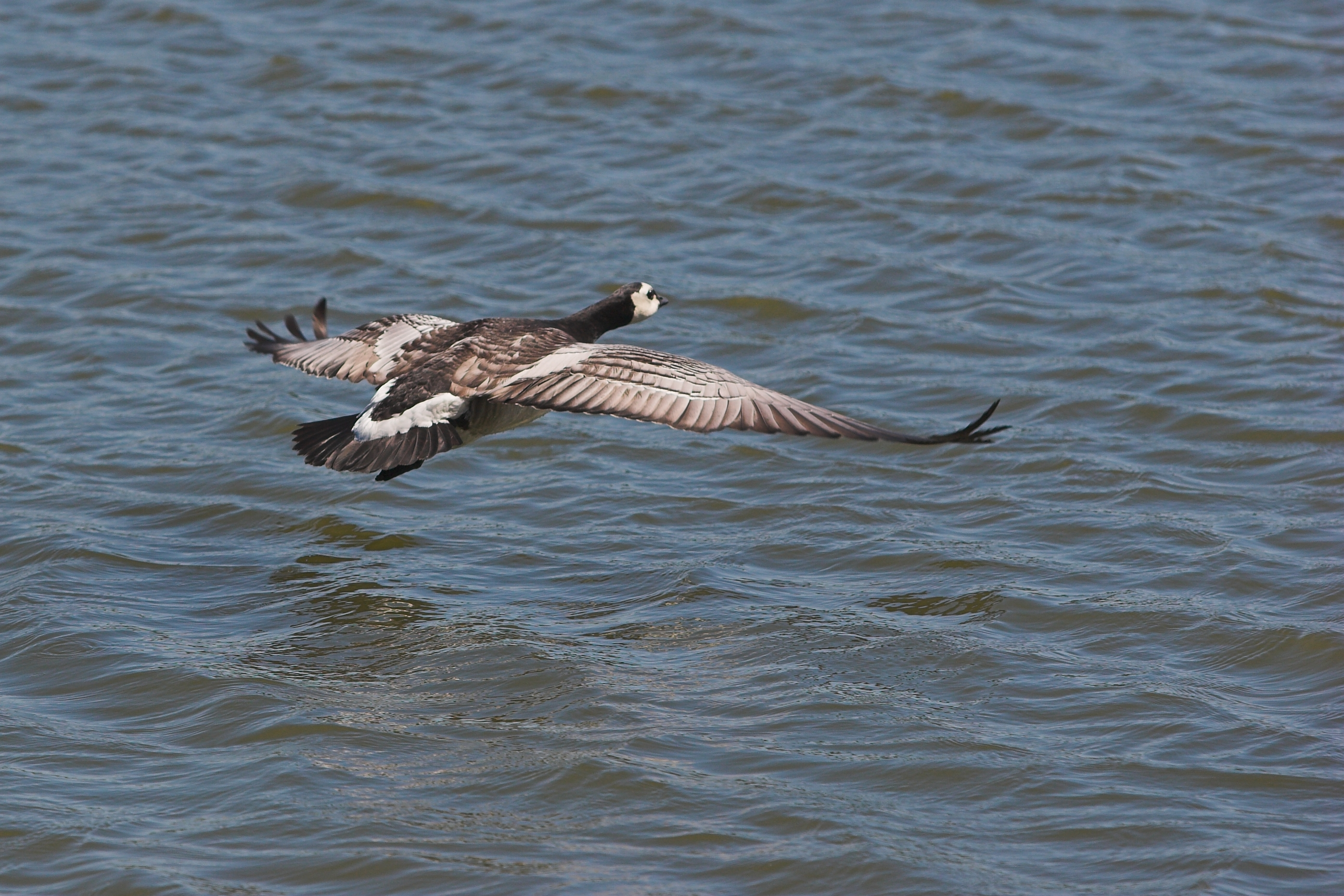
Barnacle goose in flight

Part of the Schleswig-Holstein Wadden Sea National Park is in Dithmarschen. It is the most important natural habitat in the district. Many molluscs can be found here, including bivalves, gastropods, worms and crustaceans, which provide food for larger animals. Fish use the Wadden Sea as a "kindergarten" where they can raise their offspring in a protected environment. Although many species of birds settle permanently in the Wadden Sea, many others use it only as a winter habitat or as a resting place. Typical birds in Dithmarschen are dunlins, red knots, bar-tailed godwits, northern lapwings, ringed plovers, Eurasian oystercatchers, many species of duck and gull, sandwich terns, pied avocets, brent geese and barnacle geese. 200,000 common shelducks alone come in August. The shelducks lose their feathers in the Wadden Sea and therefore are unable to fly for around three weeks. The majority of common shelducks in Northwestern Europe travel to the area at this time. Large salt marshes are located along the Friedrichskoog coast and in the Neufeld Bay.

Three sand banks, Trischen, Tertius and Blauort are in the sea. They are some of only a few still-natural habitats along the German coast, and they are of importance to sea birds and seals. After futile attempts in the 1930s to make them habitable to humans, they are now part of the national park, closed to public access. Many birds preferring wet grasslands live in the Eider-Treene Valley.

== History ==
=== High Middle Ages ===
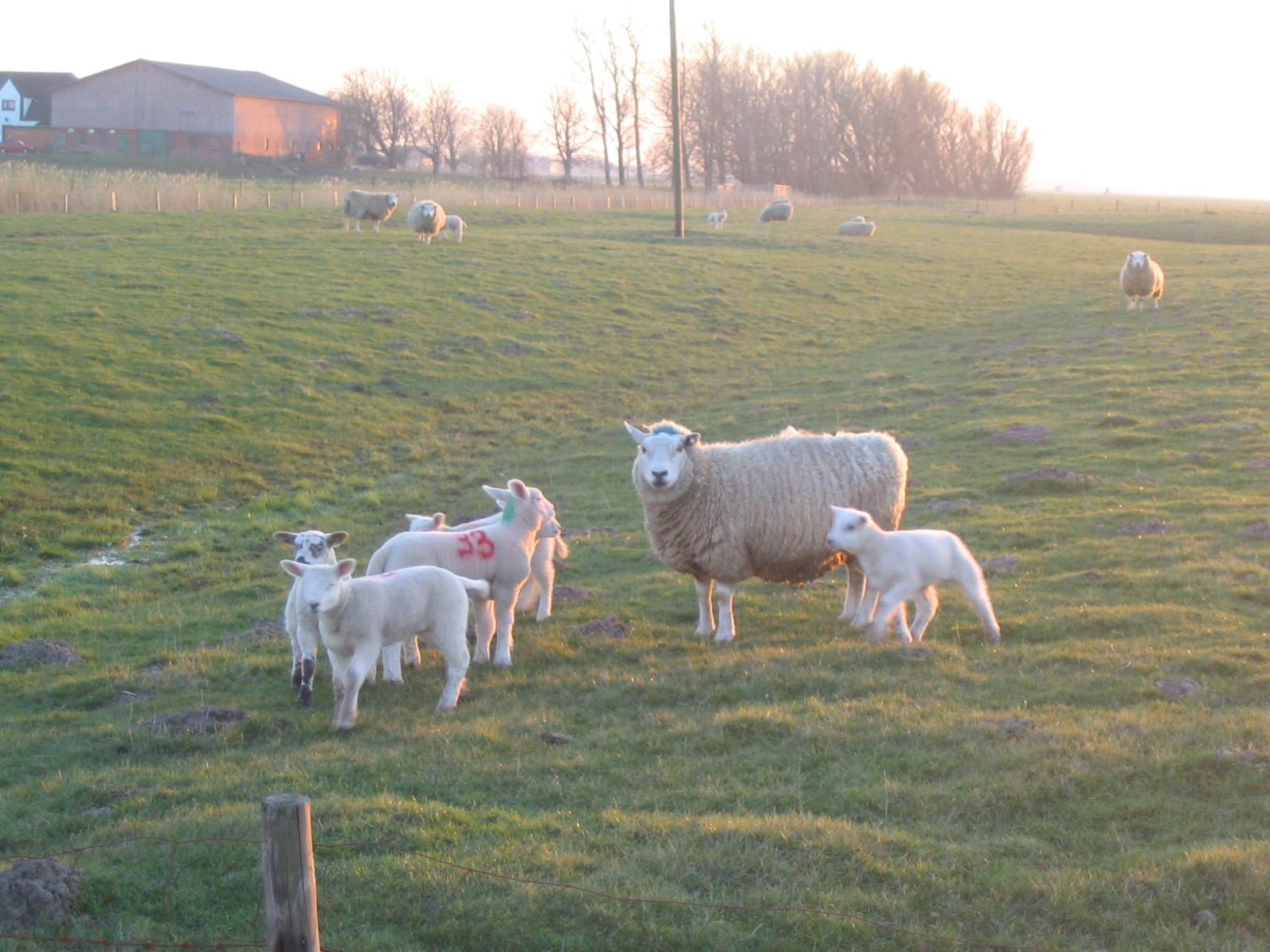
Landscape with ewes and lambs

In medieval times the marshland villages of Dithmarschen enjoyed remarkable autonomy. Neighbouring princes often tried to bring Dithmarschen under their control.

After 1180 Prince-Archbishop Siegfried ceded Dithmarschen, which was supposed to belong to his Prince-Archbishopric of Bremen, to his brother Bernhard III, Duke of the younger Duchy of Saxony. In his new position of Duke of Saxony he held the Land of Hadeln, opposite of Dithmarschen on the southern bank of the river Elbe. Adolf III of Schauenburg, Count of Holstein, at enmity with the Ascanians, had de facto taken a loose possession of Dithmarschen. It fell to Bernhard to regain the territory, but he failed, only forcing Adolf to accept his overlordship of Dithmarschen.

Prince-Archbishop Hartwig II prepared a campaign into Dithmarschen, which, while religiously belonging to the Archdiocese of Bremen, and represented by its subsidiary chapter at Hamburg Concathedral, rejected secular overlordship from Bremen. He persuaded Adolf III to waive his claim to Dithmarschen, in return for being paid regular dues to be levied from the Ditmarsians after subjugation. In 1187 and 1188 Hartwig and his ally Maurice I, Count of Oldenburg, heading their troops, invaded Dithmarschen. The free peasants promised to pay him dues, only to ridicule and renounce Hartwig, once he and his soldiers had left. The Ditmarsians gained support from Valdemar, steward of the Duchy of Schleswig and Bishop of Schleswig. Hartwig, owing dues to Adolf III and the soldiers' pay to Maurice I, was trapped and could not afford to wage a second war.

In 1192 the Bremian Chapter elected Valdemar as its new Prince-Archbishop. Valdemar welcomed his election, hoping his new position could be helpful in his dispute with Duke Valdemar of Schleswig and his elder brother Canute VI of Denmark. Before entering the Prince-Archbishopric of Bremen he won the support of Dithmarschen.

=== Late Middle Ages ===
In the 15th century the Ditmarsians confederated in a peasant republic. Though several times neighbouring princely rulers, accompanied by their knights and mercenaries, attempted to subjugate the independent peasants to feudalism, they were unsuccessful. In 1319 Gerhard III was repelled in the Battle of Wöhrden. After Eric IV, Duke of Saxe-Lauenburg had raided Dithmarschen, the Ditmarsians blamed his son-in-law, Albert II, Count of Holstein-Rendsburg, for complicity, who then used this as a pretext for his own unsuccessful conquest attempt in 1403, dying during the campaign from inflicted injuries. In 1468 Dithmarschen allied with Lübeck to protect their common interest as to commerce and containing the spreading feudalism in the region. Based on the Hanseatic obligations and privileges from the pact signed with Lübeck, Ditmarsians had established trade with Livonia and neighbouring Baltic destinations in the 15th century. Both parties renewed their alliance several times and it thus lasted until Dithmarschen's final defeat and Dano-Holsatian annexation in 1559.

In 1484 Magnus of Saxe-Lauenburg, then vicegerent of the Land of Hadeln, failed to subjugate the free Frisian peasants in the Land of Wursten, a de facto autonomous region in a North Sea marsh at the Weser estuary, which was under the loose overlordship of the Prince-Archbishopric of Bremen. This foreshadowed a series of feudal attempts to subdue regions of free peasants, an alarming signal for the Ditmarsians and the free peasants in other marshes in the area.

In April 1499 Count John XIV of Oldenburg invaded the Weser and North Sea marshes of Stadland and Butjadingen, both of which the Prince-Archbishopric of Bremen claimed overlordship over, in order to subject their free peasants. Bremen's prince-archbishop Johann Rode tried to form a military alliance to repel these invasions, and prevent further ones, first rallying the cities of Bremen, Hamburg and Stade, as they considered the areas downstream of the rivers Elbe and Weser their own front yard: essential for their free maritime trade connections. Rode won the Ditmarsians too, for a defensive alliance to protect Wursten, concluded on 1 May 1499. On 1 August the alliance, now also including Buxtehude, committed themselves to supply 1,300 warriors and equipment to defend Wursten and/or invade Hadeln.

Conversely, John V and his son Magnus of Saxe-Lauenburg had already allied with Henry IV the Elder of Brunswick and Lunenburg, Prince of Wolfenbüttel, on 24 November 1498, to conquer Wursten. Henry IV obliged to send 3,000 landsknechts, who should gain their payment by ravaging and plundering the free peasants of Wursten, once successfully subjugated.

Rode then waged feud against John V of Saxe-Lauenburg on 9 September 1499. The allied forces, with the Ditmarsians invading by crossing the Elbe, easily conquered the Land of Hadeln, and defeated Magnus.

While the cities desired a peaceful front yard without another's powerful influence, the Ditmarsians instead favoured the favour of autonomy of the free peasants. Hamburg and the Ditmarsians fell out with each other. On 16 September 1499, a landsknecht hired by Hamburg slew Cordt von der Lieth, a member of the Bremian ministerialis, causing the Otterndorf Strife (Otterndorfer Streit). The landsknecht created rumours that it had instead been a Ditmarsian who had slain von der Lieth, and fled after. Hamburg's landsknechts then attacked the uninvolved Ditmarsians and slew 76 men in their military camp near Otterndorf. Consequently, Dithmarschen cancelled its alliance with Rode, Bremen and Hamburg, and the Ditmarsians returned home. Hamburg aimed at reestablishing its rule in Hadeln, as it had wielded between 1407 and 1481 when Saxe-Lauenburg had given Hadeln to Hamburg as security for a credit. The relationship between Dithmarschen and Hamburg then turned icy, and Ditmarsians captured, according to the traditional wrecking custom, wrecked Hamburgian ships and their freight, if they foundered around the shores of Dithmarschen. (Earlier, Hamburg and Dithmarschen had agreed to replace this practice with a reward for rescuing ships, freight and crew.) The parties only reconciled in 1512.

By 20 November 1499 Magnus hired the so-called Black Guard of 6,000 ruthless and violent mostly Dutch and East Frisian mercenaries, commanded by Thomas Slentz, prior operating in the County of Oldenburg. The Black Guard invaded the Prince-Archbishopric of Bremen, passing through and ravaging areas in the Prince-Bishopric of Verden and the Brunswick-Lunenburgian Principality of Lunenburg-Celle, leaving behind a wake of devastation in the countryside and especially in the looted monasteries.

Finally, on Christmas Eve, arriving down the Weser in Lehe, the Black Guard tried to invade Wursten. However, the free peasants there repelled their attack near Weddewarden on 26 December. So the Guard turned northeastwards, looting Neuenwalde Nunnery underways, into Hadeln, repressing the joint forces of Rode and the cities – lacking support by Bremian knights and the Ditmarsians –, recapturing it for Magnus in early 1500.

Rode then converted Henry IV the Elder to his column, with Henry the Elder and his troops then hunting the Black Guard. Magnus, unable to pay the mercenaries so that they turned even the more oppressive for the local population, was like the Sorcerer's Apprentice, who could not get rid of "the spirits that he called". By mid-January 1500 King John of Denmark hired the Guard and guaranteed for its safe conduct first southeastwards via Lunenburg-Cellean Winsen upon Luhe and Hoopte, crossing the Elbe by Zollenspieker Ferry to the Hamburg-Lübeckian bi-urban condominium (Beiderstädtischer Besitz) of Bergedorf and Vierlande.

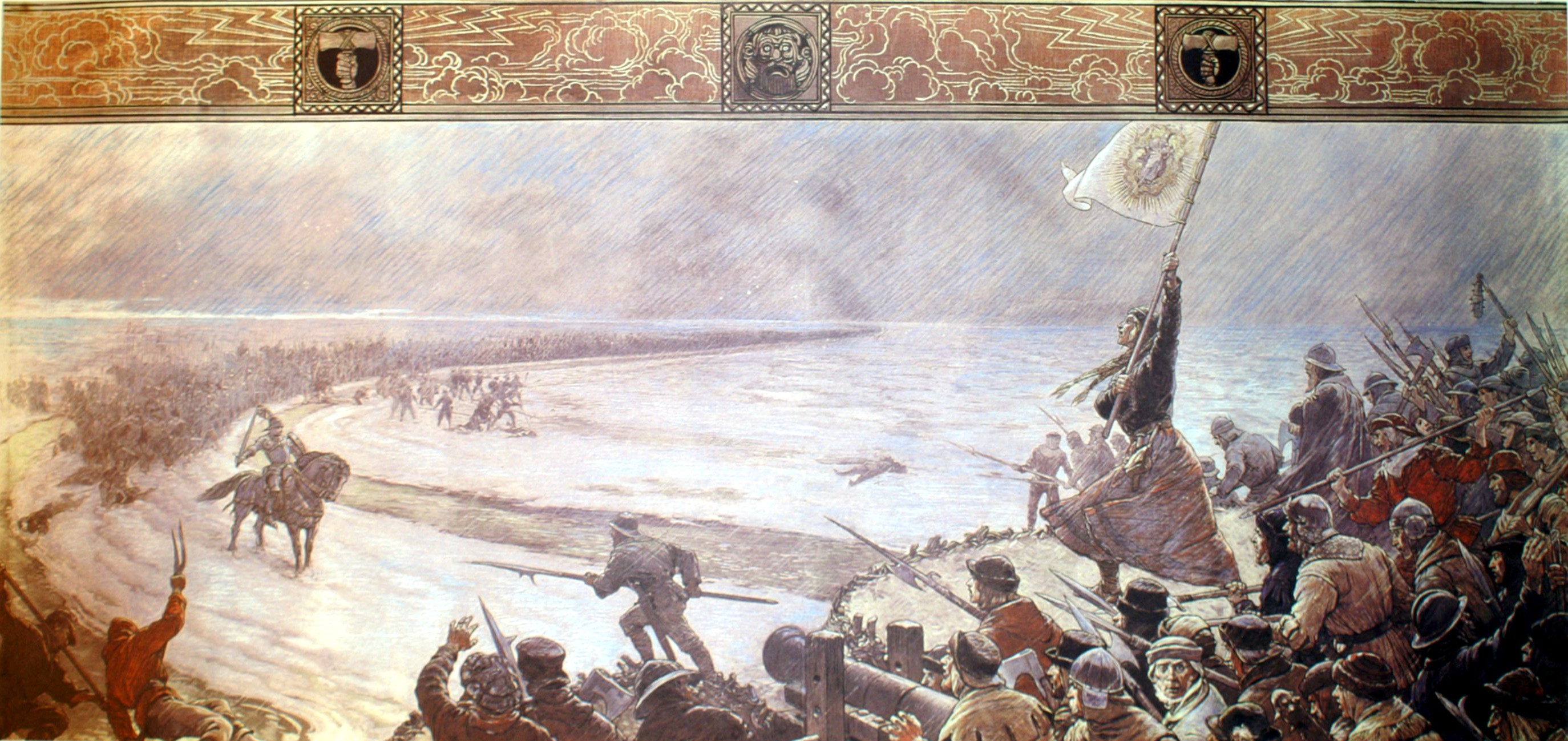
The Battle of Hemmingstedt in a history painting of 1910 by Max Friedrich Koch, assembly hall of the former District Building in Meldorf.

From there the Black Guard headed northwestwards again through Holstein in order to join more of King John's forces recruited in Holstein and by the Kalmar Union. These forces then invaded Dithmarschen in order to subject the free Ditmarsians. The Ditmarsians took a vow to donate a monastery in honour of the then national patron saint Mary of Nazareth if they could repel the invasion. On 17 February 1500, in the Battle of Hemmingstedt, the outnumbered Ditmarsians, led by Wulf Isebrand, defeated the invading armies and thus destroyed King John's dream of subjecting Dithmarschen.

In 1513 the Ditmarsians founded a Franciscan Friary in Lunden fulfilling their vow. However, the Hamburg concathedral chapter, holding the ecclesiastical jurisdiction, demanded its say in appointing the prebendaries. After years of dispute, the Council of the 48, the elected governing body of the farmers' republic of Ditmarsh, decided to found a Gallicanist kind of independent Catholic Church of Dithmarschen in August 1523, denying Hamburg's capitular jurisdiction in all of Dithmarschen. The chapter could not regain the jurisdiction, including its share in ecclesiastical fees and fines levied in Dithmarschen. After violently repelling the first preaching of proponents of the Reformation, slaying Henry of Zutphen in December 1524, Lutheranism nevertheless started to win over Ditmarsians. In 1533 the Council of the 48 turned the Ditmarsian Catholic Church into a Lutheran state church.

=== Post-Medieval ===
After the victory of Hemmingstedt Dithmarschen regularly sent its delegates to the Hanseatic Diets (Hansetage). In 1554 the Hanseatic Diet confirmed that free Ditmarsian peasants doing business cannot be considered equal to merchants being burghers of free or autonomous cities, but are, nevertheless, accepted as enjoying all Hanseatic advantages. Thus Ditmarsian merchants, along with those from Teutonic Prussia, were the only beneficiaries of a quasi membership within the Hanse, although lacking the background of citizenship in an autonomous or free city.

It was not until 1559 and the Last Feud between the King of Denmark and the Ditmarsians that the free peasants were forced to give up their political and religious autonomy by the successful invasion commanded by Count Johan Rantzau from Steinburg, one of the best strategists of the time. Since then the coat of arms of Dithmarschen has shown a warrior on horseback, representing a knight of Rantzau. This knight has later been identified with Saint George, then considered to be the patron of Dithmarschen.

The conquerors – King Frederick II, Duke Adolf, and Duke John II the Elder – divided Dithmarschen into two parts: the south became a part of Holstein in personal union with Denmark while the north came into the possession of the other Duke of Holstein. From 1773 all of Holstein was united in personal union with Denmark and remained so until 1864, when, following the Second Schleswig War, the Duchies of Holstein and of Schleswig became an occupied territory of the German Confederation. Two years later, following the Austro-Prussian War, Dithmarschen became part of the Kingdom of Prussia, which annexed Holstein and Schleswig making them subsequently the Province of Schleswig-Holstein.

The Middle Ages in Dithmarschen are held to have continued into the 19th century, when the Kiel Canal was completed, fens began to be drained, and agricultural reforms took place. Within the Bundesland Schleswig-Holstein, the area remained divided into the districts of Norderdithmarschen (Northern Ditmarsh) and Süderdithmarschen (Southern Ditmarsh) before they were united in 1970 as the district of Dithmarschen.

== Culture ==
=== Traditions ===
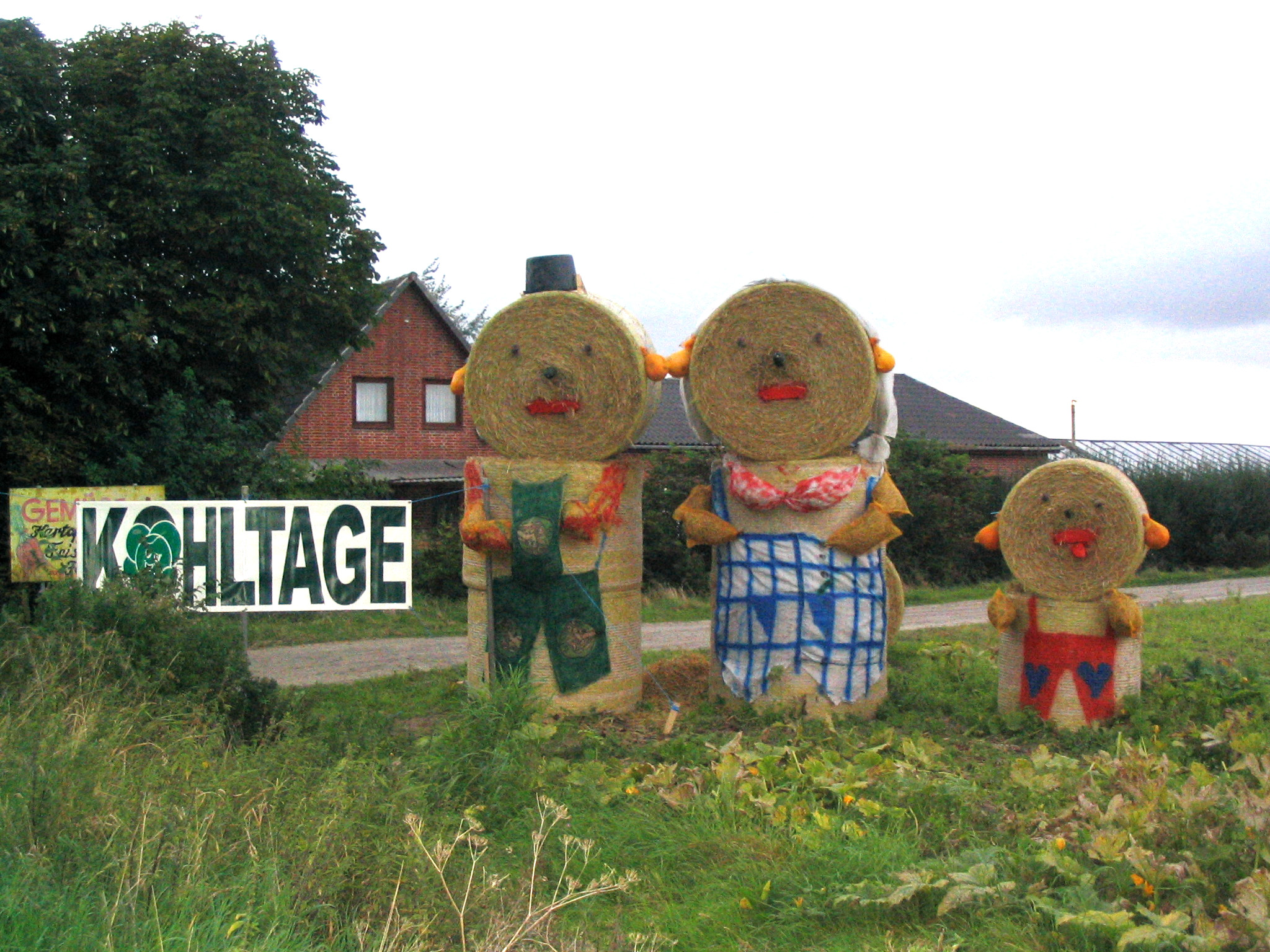
"Cabbage Days"

The people of Dithmarschen have displayed great pride in their history. In recent decades many traditions have been revitalized and new events in a traditional fashion have been created.

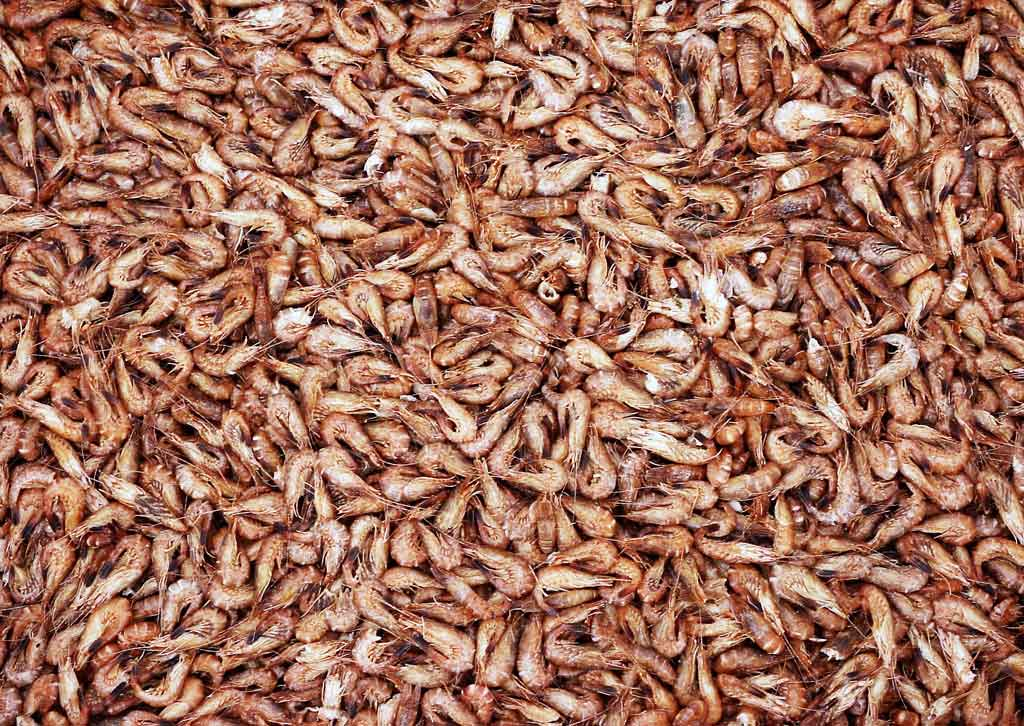
Common shrimp

=== Language ===
High German is by now the dominant language but Low German in its Holsteinisch version still has a place in informal conversation. Until the 1960s Low German was the prevailing language of everyday communication. Most Ditmarsians born before 1960 still consider Low German their mother tongue. Low German is more common in rural regions than in urban regions and more likely to be spoken by older Ditmarsians.

The best known author of "high literature" in Low German was Klaus Groth from Heide. The best known Low German speaker in Germany today is probably Wilhelm Wieben, former anchorman of the popular German news Tagesschau, who now produces Low German audiobooks. Only two episodes of the popular crime television show Tatort carried subtitles for its German audience. One of these episodes centered its plot in Dithmarschen: the Low German in the dialogue was thought to be too difficult for a generic German audience to follow.

=== Architecture ===
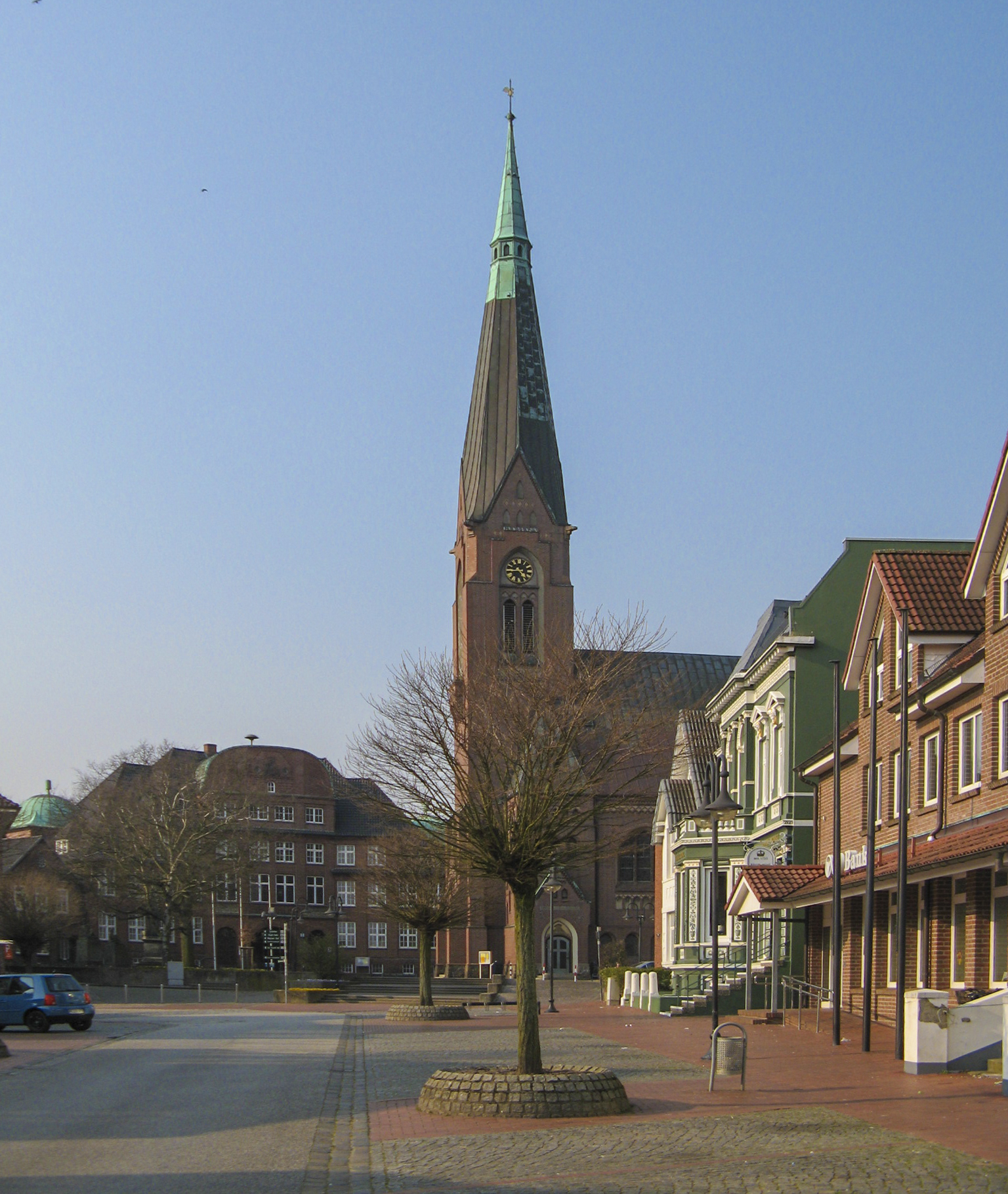
Marne church and city hall

The Dithmarschen landscape was long dominated by churches. Palaces were never built in the farmers' republic. The few castles that were constructed played only minor roles and have long since been reduced to groundworks. In contrast, churches were symbols of not only spiritual but also worldly power. The medieval republic organised itself into Parishes ("Kirchspiele") centered on churches. A Dithmarschen church was not just a sacral building; it was also the primary place for political meetings. Administration of spiritual and political matters was done by the same people in the same place, so little need for representative secular buildings arose. Political and religious life in Dithmarschen remained undivided until Schleswig-Holstein's integration into Prussia in 1867.

In the flat marshland of Dithmarschen, church towers can often be seen from more than 10 kilometers away. Churches are built on the highest point of the Terpen in the center of villages such as Wesselburen, Marne, and Wöhrden. Village streets run toward the central church, giving these villages a distinct medieval character. It is likely that older houses were removed to make room for these churches. In the Geest, the village church stands on the medieval rim of the village or with other houses within it; the settlements of the Geest existed before their churches were built and there was no special need to protect these churches from flooding.

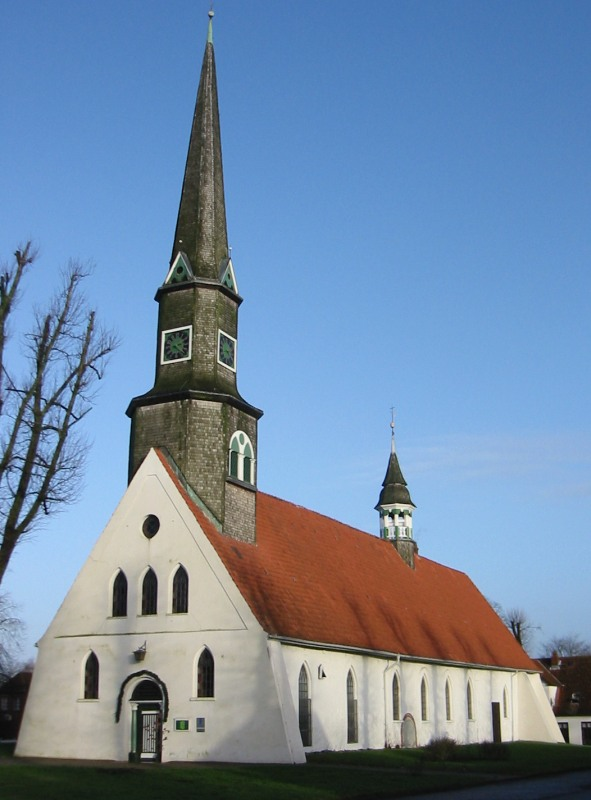
St. Secundus in Hennstedt

The most important church of Dithmarschen was the so-called Sankt-Johannis-Kirche (St. John's the Baptist Church) in Meldorf, due to its size also called Meldorf Cathedral. Between the 9th and 11th century it was the only church in Dithmarschen and one of the few north of the Elbe River. In the Middle Ages the church was the venue of the representatives of the political parishes of Dithmarschen. The place around this church was the most important meeting place in Dithmarschen and Meldorf itself was the only settlement to develop a distinct urban structure. Even after the political center moved to Heide, the St. John's in Meldorf remained the most important religious site in Dithmarschen. The Reformation in Dithmarschen began there in 1524 with Dithmarschen converting to Lutheranism.

Today's church was built in the 14th century. While the outside was mainly rebuilt in the 19th century, inside one can still see Gothic architecture from the years 1250 to 1300. The paintings are among the most magnificent in Schleswig-Holstein, giving an impression of the former wealth of the farmers' republic.

St. Jürgen church in Heide began as a chapel built in the 15th century. Due to conflicts in Dithmarschen, Meldorf lost its role as central meeting point. The people of northern Dithmarschen began to meet in 1447 "auf der Heide" ("on the heath"); later, the Council of the 48—representatives of the most important families and the central decision body of Dithmarschen—met at St. Jürgen. The core of the long, single-nave church is still the 15th-century building. Its outer appearance is dominated by a late-renaissance three-story tower added by Johann Georg Schott in 1724.

St. Bartholomäus in Wesselburen was also built in 1737/1738 by Johann Georg Schott. He constructed the baroque building from the remains of older churches after Wesselburen burned down in 1736. Its onion dome is highly unusual for Northern Germany. Also notable are the 12th-century church in Tellingstedt and the churches in Hemme and Büsum, which display the traditional coat of arms of the "Geschlechter" inside.

== Education ==
In 1993 Schleswig-Holstein's latest Fachhochschule (comparable to a Polytechnics) was established in Heide. There are 800 students studying economics, electrical engineering, information technology, international tourism management, and law at the Fachhochschule Westküste (Fachhochschule West Coast). The Christian-Albrechts-Universität zu Kiel has an outpost in the Büsum-based Forschungs- und Technologiezentrum Westküste (Research and Technology Center West Coast), which researches coastal geology, coastal geography, and coastal protection.

In 2004, 17,900 students were studying in Dithmarschen schools. In the district there are six Gymnasia, three Fachgymnasia, two vocational schools, and 44 schools for primary education.

== Economy ==
The Dithmarschen economy consists mainly of tourism, agriculture, and energy. Tourism is concentrated in the north in Büsum and in the south in Friedrichskoog. Most tourists come as families to enjoy the North Sea beaches. A significant number of tourists also come for bicycle trekking. Almost all of the approximately two million tourists each year come from Germany.

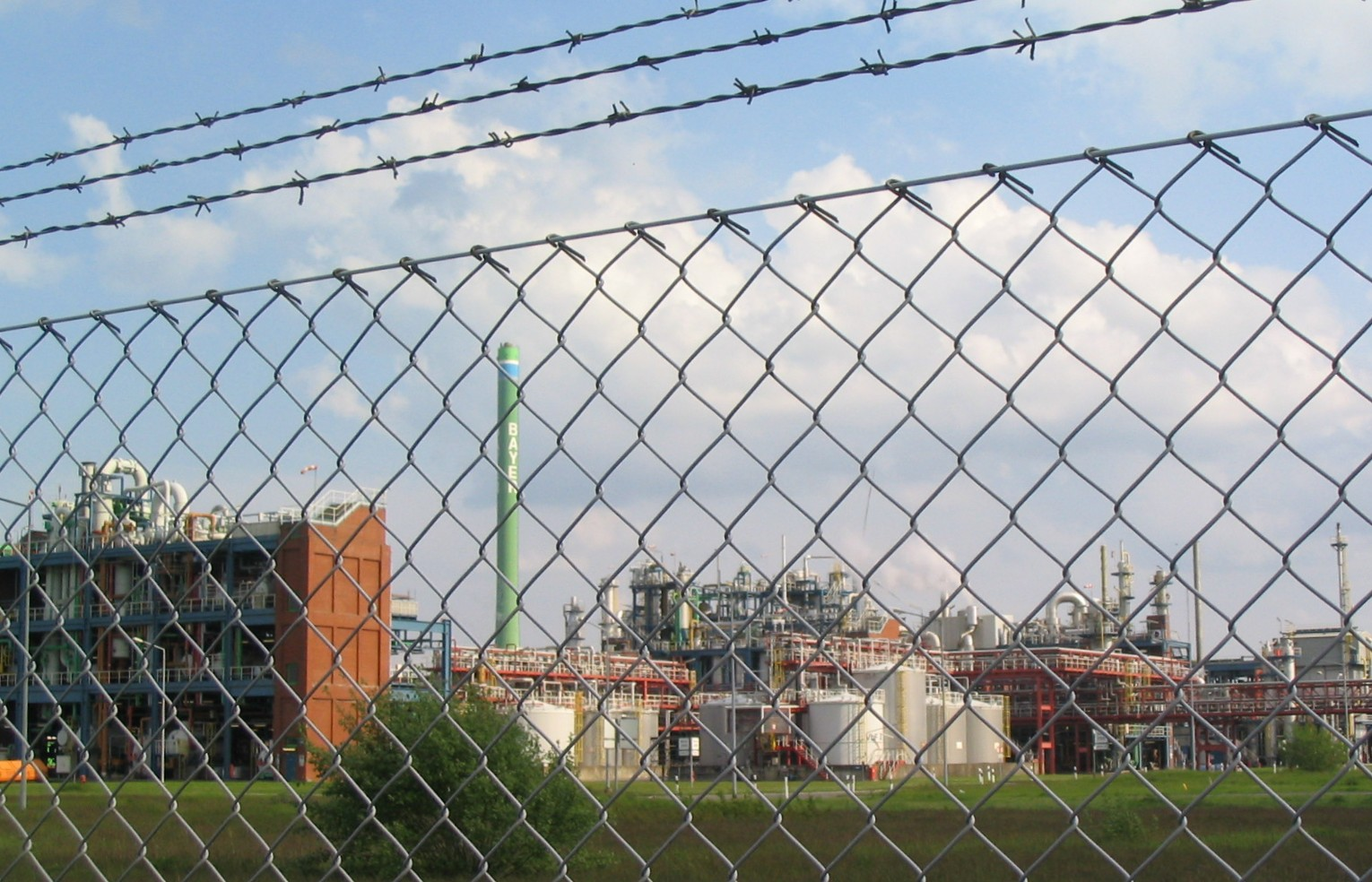
Bayer, the most important employer in the district.

The unemployment rate was 11.6% in September 2004. After the Hartz concept was implemented and new statistical methods were adopted, the unemployment rate rose to 17.4% in January 2005. The unemployment rate was far above the average for Schleswig-Holstein (12.7%) and the rest of Germany. The most important employers in the district are Bayer in Brunsbüttel (1,000 employees), the Sparkasse Westholstein (600), the Royal Dutch Shell refinery in Hemmingstedt (570), the Sasol chemistry works in Brunsbüttel (570), the printing company Evers in Meldorf (560), and the Beyschlag manufacturing plant in Heide. The Bundeswehr has a school for non-commissioned officers in Heide.

In recent years the number of people who live in Dithmarschen but work in Hamburg and its surroundings has steadily risen. In 2002 9,200 people drove to work outside the district, including 1,700 who commuted to Hamburg.

=== Energy ===
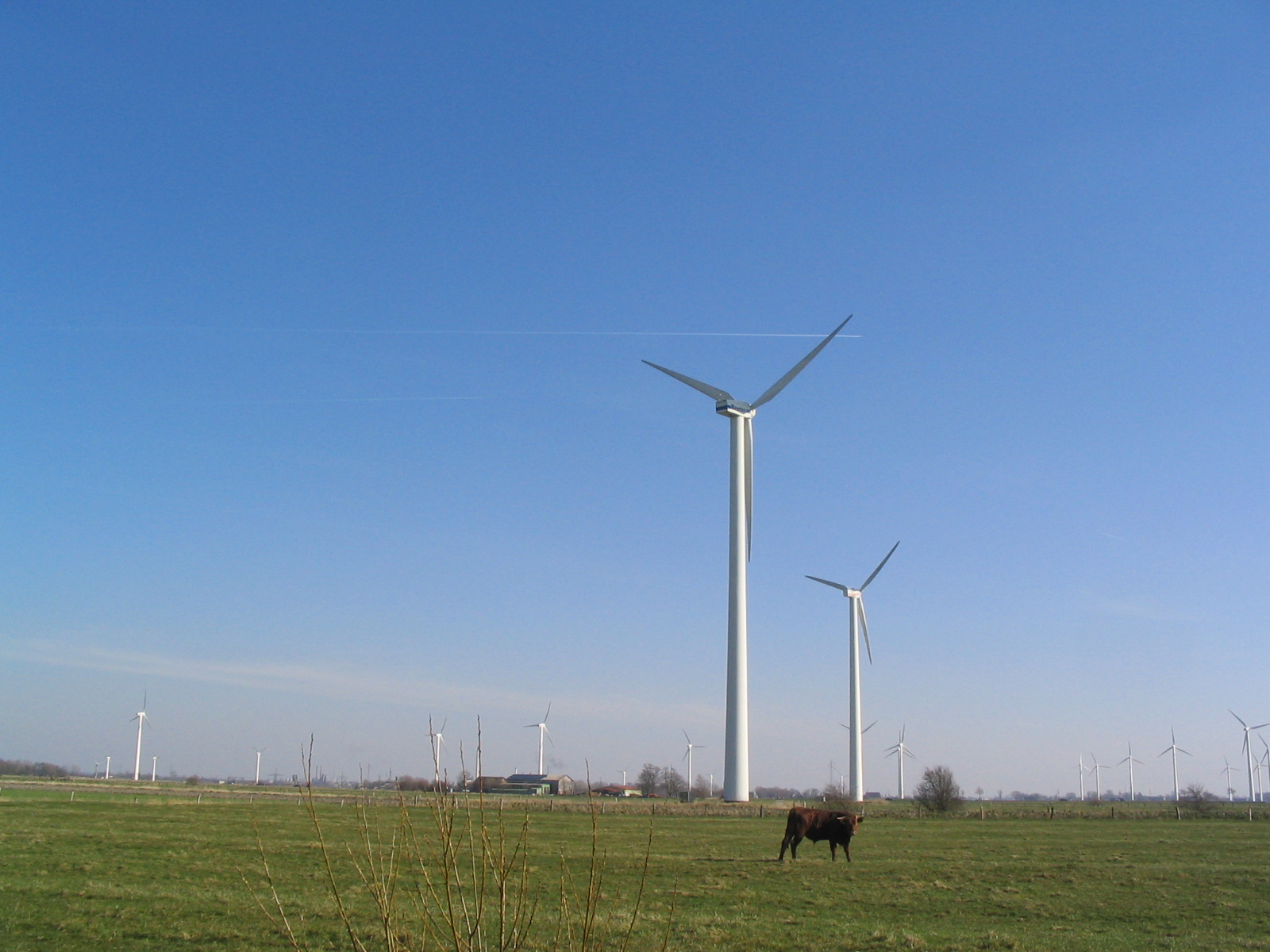
Wind turbines close to Poppenwurth

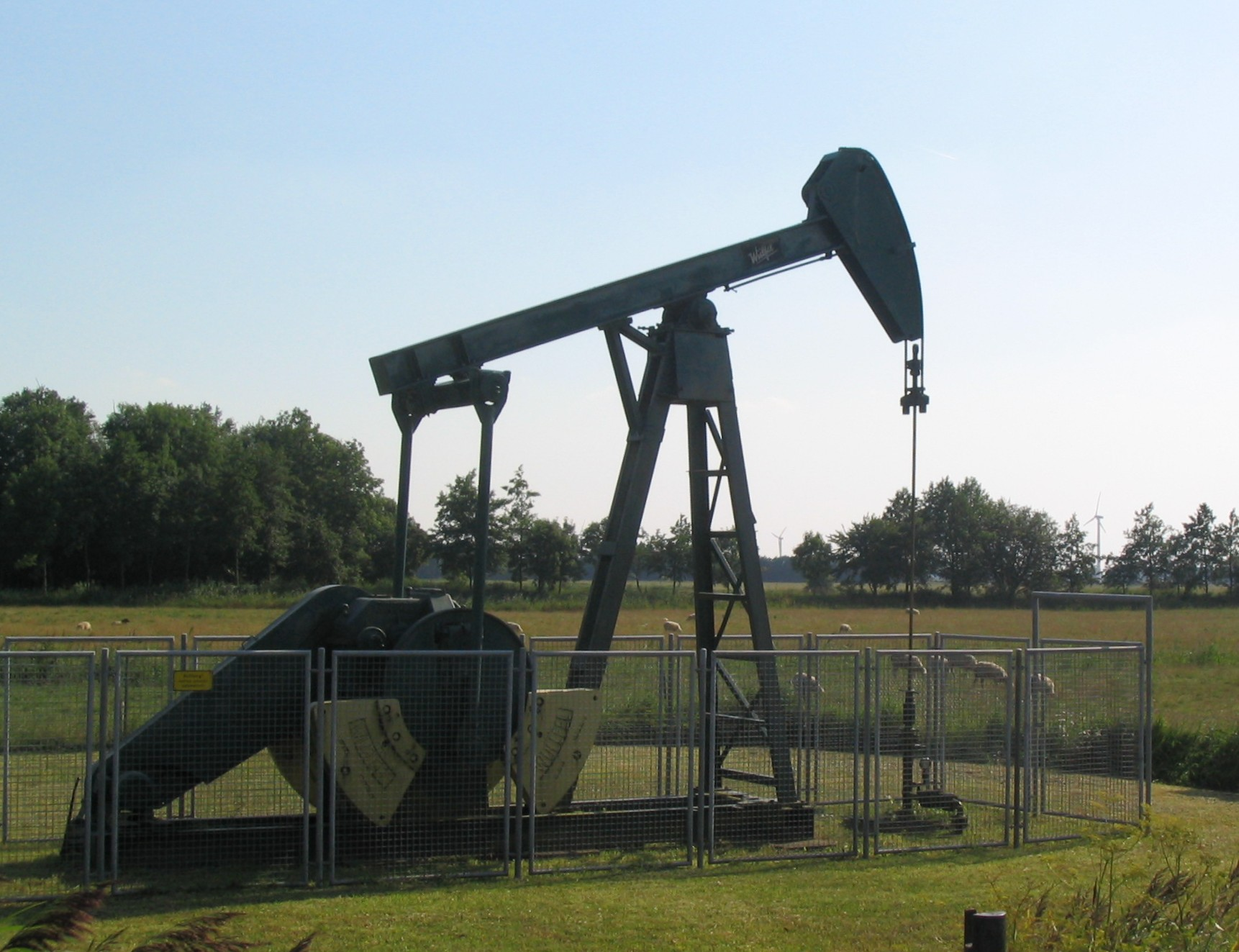
Old nodding donkey, Hemmingstedt

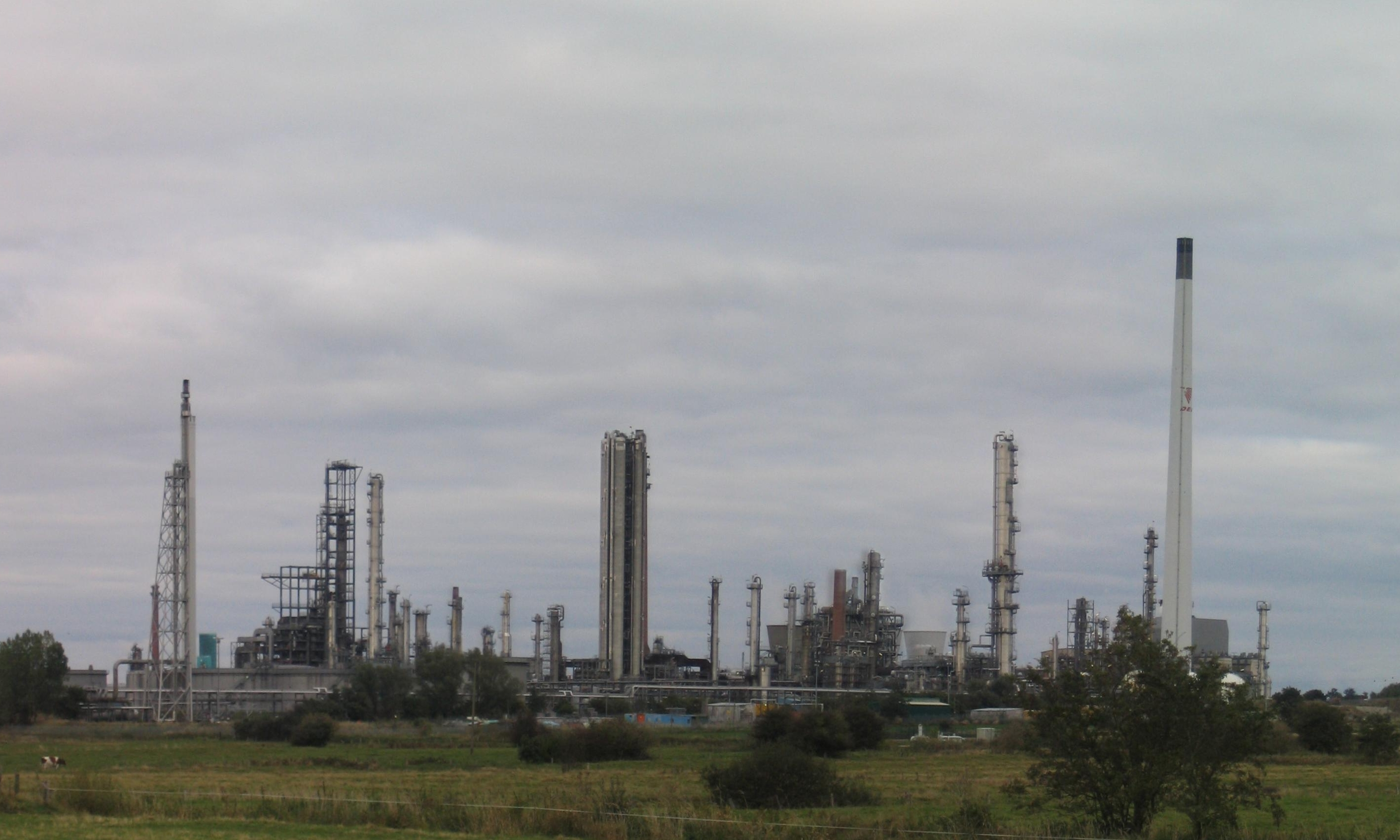
Hemmingstedt refinery

Commercial wind farming in Germany began in Dithmarschen. Germany's first wind park was opened 1987 in Kaiser-Wilhelm-Koog, the experimental GROWIAN ("Große Windkraftanlage" – big wind turbine) stood there from 1983 to 1987. As of 2008 the tallest wind turbine in the world is the experimental Enercon E-126 near Emden.

In Dithmarschen stand around 800 wind turbines, almost all of them in marshland. That means that 5% of all German wind turbines stand on 0.15% of its area. Except for Büsum, where a small airport prevents their erection, and the nature reserve at Speicherkoog, the whole coastline is lined by wind turbines. In 2003 they produced around KWH of energy, which is about half the energy demand of Dithmarschen. According to E.on-Hanse, the local energy company, in the same time it paid 59 million Euro for the energy, 3 to 5 million Euro were paid to farmers on whose land the turbines stand. The income through taxes for the district is around 4 million Euro each year. Because commercial wind farming in Germany began in Dithmarschen, many wind turbines are relative old and produce only a small amount of electricity. For people interested in wind turbines this makes an interesting contrast, though, since it is possible to see many working varieties of wind turbines standing close to each other.

The offshore oil field Mittelplate close to the coast produces 2 million tons of petroleum, around 54% of German production. The refinery in Hemmingstedt processes around 4 million tons of oil each year, partly from Mittelplate and partly from oil delivered through the Brunsbüttel port. Another oil field between Heide and Hemmingstedt was active until 1991. The nuclear power plant in Brunsbuttel is one of the oldest in Germany. It delivers cheap energy for the important aluminium industry in Schleswig-Holstein. It is supposed to close down in 2009.

== Tourism ==
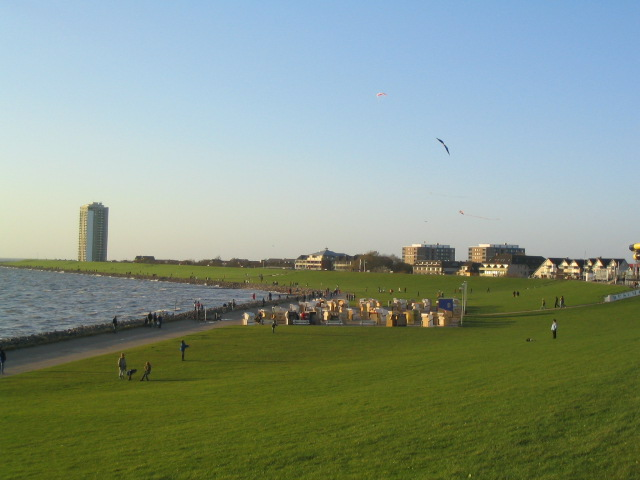
Büsum beach

The main tourist attractions in Dithmarschen are the North Sea and the Wadden Sea National Park. The district owns about 10 kilometers of green beaches; Büsum also provides an artificial sandy beach. In 2003, 205,382 tourists spent 1,173,205 nights in Dithmarschen, most of them in Büsum (756,630 nights), which is ranked before Friedrichskoog (75,654) and Büsumer Deichhausen (33,811). Tourism has declined slightly over the last few years but not as much as tourism on the Schleswig-Holstein Baltic coast. Recent competition with the former Warsaw Pact states and their Baltic coasts has had less impact on Dithmarschen because their coastal formations are quite different.

Entrance fees for beaches raise heated controversy in the district. Büsum (around 1,000,000 beach visits each year) and Friedrichskoog (300,000) impose a fee. However, most smaller villages nearby do not.

The tourism industry in Dithmarschen is trying to diversify tourist attractions. Fitness and health play an increasing role in German life, so tracks and roads for bicycles and inline skates are being built. Part of the North Sea Cycle Route crosses through Dithmarschen. In the east of Dithmarschen, ecological travel by canoe or kayak along the Eider is promoted. Policy makers and tourism agencies also emphasize the cultural and historical roots of the district.

== Coat of arms ==
The district coat of arms displays a knight of Holstein. This coat of arms was unpopular for many years in Dithmarschen because it was the sign of conquerors. These arms were used by governors but were not accepted by the people. In 1930, when these ancient hostilities had become irrelevant, this coat of arms was re-introduced in slightly different forms by both South Dithmarschen and North Dithmarschen. When both districts were united in 1970, the arms of South Dithmarschen became the symbol of the newly merged district.

== Towns and municipalities ==
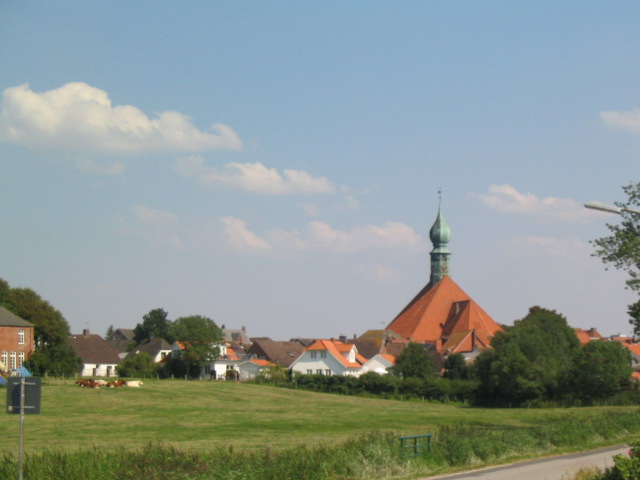
Wesselburen Skyline

Towns and municipalities in Dithmarschen developed from the old parishes that were independent political divisions in the medieval farmers' republic. These parishes existed as primary political divisions until the 19th century. Only Meldorf was able to develop an urban structure during the Middle Ages.

In more recent times Heide became a rival to Meldorf. Wesselburen and Wöhrden had some importance as central villages of the rich northern marshland.

After Schleswig-Holstein was annexed by Prussia in 1867, some villages became towns and therefore administratively left their old parishes: Meldorf in 1869, Heide in 1878, Marne in 1891, and Wesselburen in 1899. The old village of Brunsbüttel and the newly founded Brunsbüttelkoog united in 1970 to become the town of Brunsbüttel.

Parishes were finally dissolved and single villages became independent during the Nazi period. For efficient administration, municipalities are united in Ämtern.

The largest town by population is Heide. Büsum has a special role as tourist resort. Although a member of an Amt, its summertime population swells to become the largest in the district.

In socio-geographics the difference between marshland and the higher, dryer uplands has played an important role. The fertile marshland was historically rich while the uplands were poor but less prone to flooding. The two most important towns, Heide and Meldorf, were built on the safe geest but directly adjacent to marshland where people could have their fields.

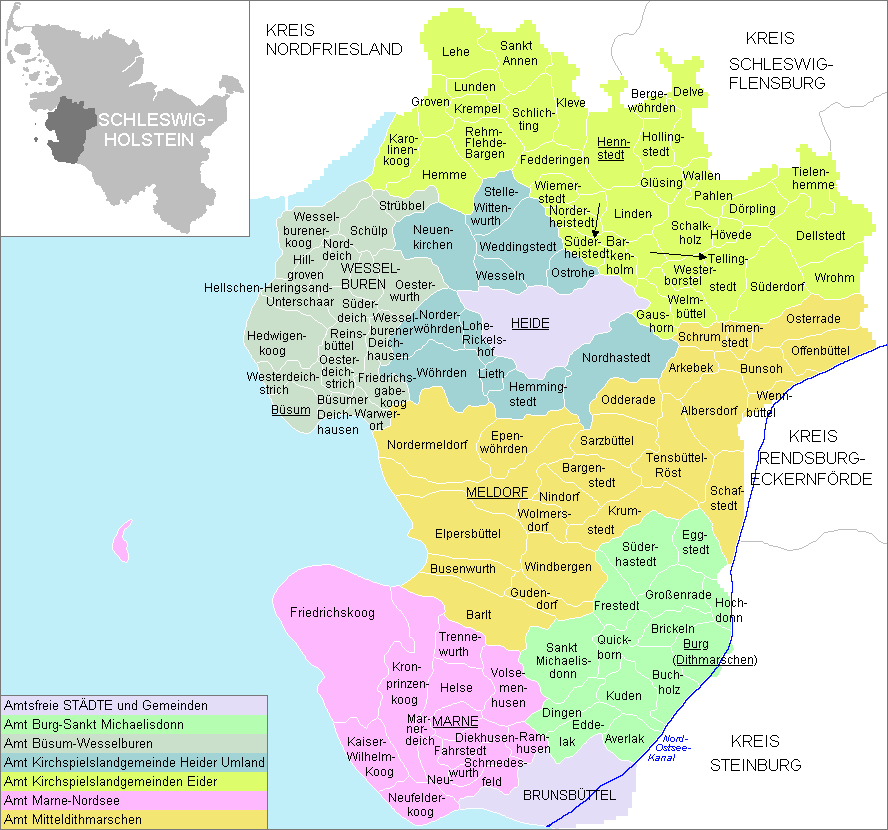

(Population on 30 September 2005)

Independent towns
1. Brunsbüttel (13,789)
2. Heide (20,716)

Ämter
1. Burg-Sankt Michaelisdonn; 1. Averlak (640); 2. Brickeln (212); 3. Buchholz (1,115); 4. Burg Dith.^{1} (4,364); 5. Dingen (714); 6. Eddelak (1,462); 7. Eggstedt (836); 8. Frestedt (401); 9. Großenrade (529); 10. Hochdonn (1,249); 11. Kuden (664); 12. Quickborn (199); 13. Sankt Michaelisdonn (3,728); 14. Süderhastedt (874); 2. Büsum-Wesselburen; 1. Büsum^{1} (4,880); 2. Büsumer Deichhausen (345); 3. Friedrichsgabekoog (71); 4. Hedwigenkoog (271); 5. Hellschen-Heringsand-Unterschaar (169); 6. Hillgroven (86); 7. Norddeich (430); 8. Oesterdeichstrich (273); 9. Oesterwurth (274); 10. Reinsbüttel (427); 11. Schülp (489); 12. Strübbel (96); 13. Süderdeich (536); 14. Warwerort (284); 15. Wesselburen^{2} (3,112); 16. Wesselburener Deichhausen (142); 17. Wesselburenerkoog (151); 18. Westerdeichstrich (908)	3. Eider; 1. Barkenholm (189); 2. Bergewöhrden (36); 3. Dellstedt (801); 4. Delve (737); 5. Dörpling (611); 6. Fedderingen (277); 7. Gaushorn (213); 8. Glüsing (119); 9. Groven (128); 10. Hemme (514); 11. Hennstedt^{1} (1,880); 12. Hollingstedt (338); 13. Hövede (64); 14. Karolinenkoog (132); 15. Kleve (452); 16. Krempel (663); 17. Lehe (1,160); 18. Linden (876); 19. Lunden (1,655); 20. Norderheistedt (144); 21. Pahlen (1,168); 22. Rehm-Flehde-Bargen (609); 23. Sankt Annen (355); 24. Schalkholz (595); 25. Schlichting (239); 26. Süderdorf (396); 27. Süderheistedt (542); 28. Tellingstedt (2,493); 29. Tielenhemme (178); 30. Wallen (37); 31. Welmbüttel (465); 32. Westerborstel (98); 33. Wiemerstedt (165); 34. Wrohm (732); 4. Heider Umland [seat: Heide]; 1. Hemmingstedt (2,989); 2. Lieth (396); 3. Lohe-Rickelshof (1,942); 4. Neuenkirchen (1,044); 5. Norderwöhrden (287); 6. Nordhastedt (2,753); 7. Ostrohe (963); 8. Stelle-Wittenwurth (486); 9. Weddingstedt (2,321); 10. Wesseln (1,352); 11. Wöhrden (1,334)	5. Marne-Nordsee; 1. Diekhusen-Fahrstedt (734); 2. Friedrichskoog (2,522); 3. Helse (964); 4. Kaiser-Wilhelm-Koog (364); 5. Kronprinzenkoog (965); 6. Marne^{1, 2} (6,018); 7. Marnerdeich (341); 8. Neufeld (646); 9. Neufelderkoog (144); 10. Ramhusen (163); 11. Schmedeswurth (215); 12. Trennewurth (269); 13. Volsemenhusen (368); 6. Mitteldithmarschen; 1. Albersdorf (3,588); 2. Arkebek (250); 3. Bargenstedt (925); 4. Barlt (844); 5. Bunsoh (871); 6. Busenwurth (331); 7. Elpersbüttel (915); 8. Epenwöhrden (808); 9. Gudendorf (425); 10. Immenstedt (97); 11. Krumstedt (556); 12. Meldorf^{1, 2} (7,655); 13. Nindorf (1.165); 14. Nordermeldorf (649); 15. Odderade (325); 16. Offenbüttel (283); 17. Osterrade (462); 18. Sarzbüttel (735); 19. Schafstedt (1,343); 20. Schrum (77); 21. Tensbüttel-Röst (692); 22. Wennbüttel (77); 23. Windbergen (841); 24. Wolmersdorf (345)
^{1}seat of the Amt; ^{2}town

== Twinning ==
Dithmarschen is currently twinned with Restormel, a borough in the British county of Cornwall. The main link is between St Austell and Newquay and Heide.

== Notable residents ==
- Klaus Groth (1819–1899), a Low German poet
- Hans Bothmann (1911–1946), Nazi SS concentration camp commandant
