= Wesselburen =

- Town
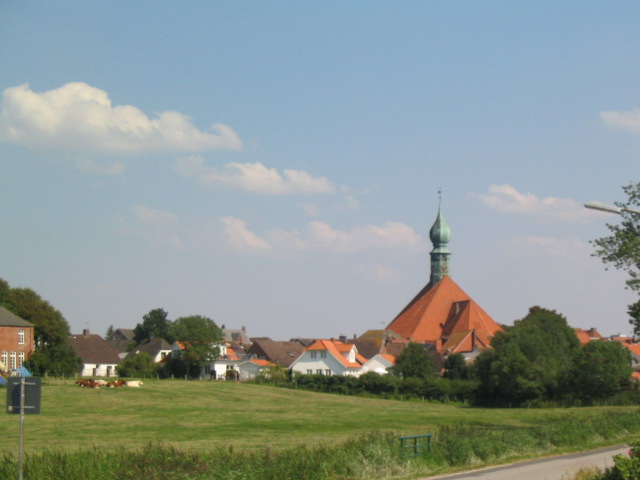

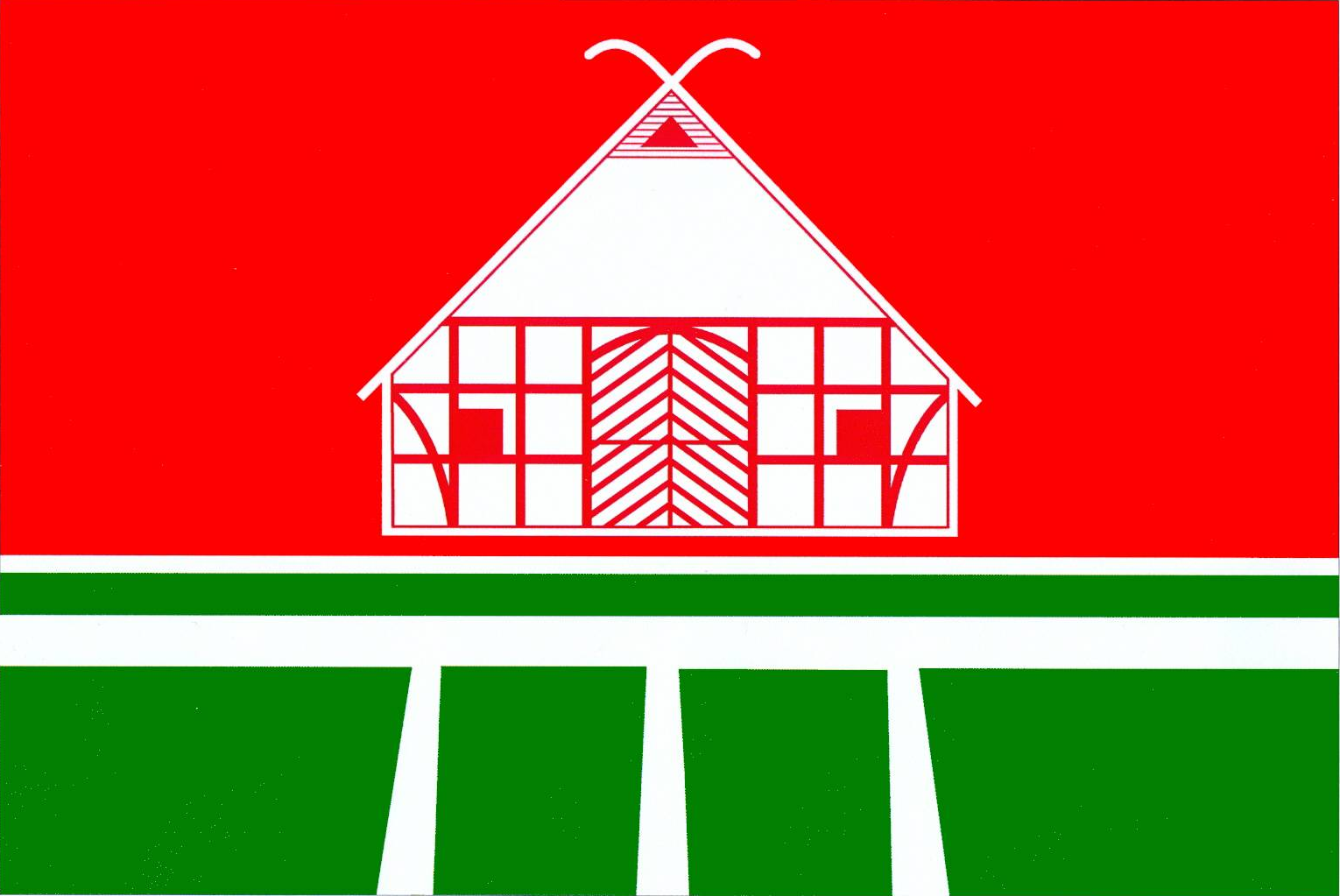
- Flag Coat of arms

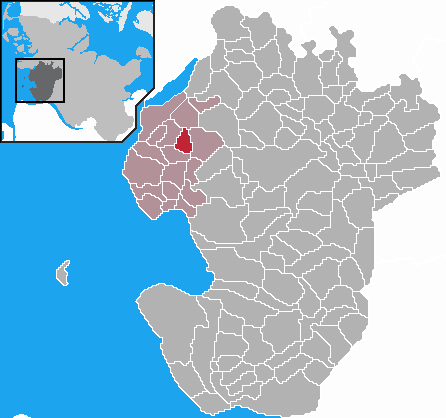
- Location of Wesselburen within Dithmarschen district
- Interactive map of Wesselburen
- Location within Germany Location within Schleswig-Holstein
- Coordinates: 54°13′N 08°55′E
- Country: Germany
- State: Schleswig-Holstein
- District: Dithmarschen
- Municipal assoc.: Büsum-Wesselburen

Government
  - Mayor: Heinz-Werner Buhrs

Area
  - Total: 5.13 km^{2} (1.98 sq mi)
- Elevation: 0 m (0 ft)

Population (2025-12-31)
  - Total: 3,336
  - Density: 650/km^{2} (1,680/sq mi)
- Time zone: UTC+01:00 (CET)
  - Summer (DST): UTC+02:00 (CEST)
- Postal codes: 25762–25764
- Dialling codes: 04833
- Vehicle registration: HEI
- Website: www.wesselburen-online.de

Wesselburen (German pronunciation: [vɛsl̩ˈbuːʁən]) is a small town in the district of Dithmarschen in the German Federal State of Schleswig-Holstein. It is situated near the North Sea coast, approximately 11 kilometres (6.8 mi) west of Heide.

Wesselburen is part of the Amt ("collective municipality") Büsum-Wesselburen.

== Notable residents ==
- Christian Friedrich Hebbel, 1813–1863, poet and dramatist
- Christian Otto Mohr, 1835–1918, civil engineer
- Adolf Bartels, 1862–1945, journalist, poet, and also literary historian
- Ottilie Reylaender, 1882–1965, painter associated with the artist colony in Worpeswede
- Jil Sander (born 1943), fashion designer
- Jürgen Koppelin (born 1945), politician (FDP)
- Kirsten Fehrs (born 1961), bishop
- Max Pauly (1907–1946), SS concentration camp commander and war criminal
- Torge Oelrich (born 1988), comedian and actor

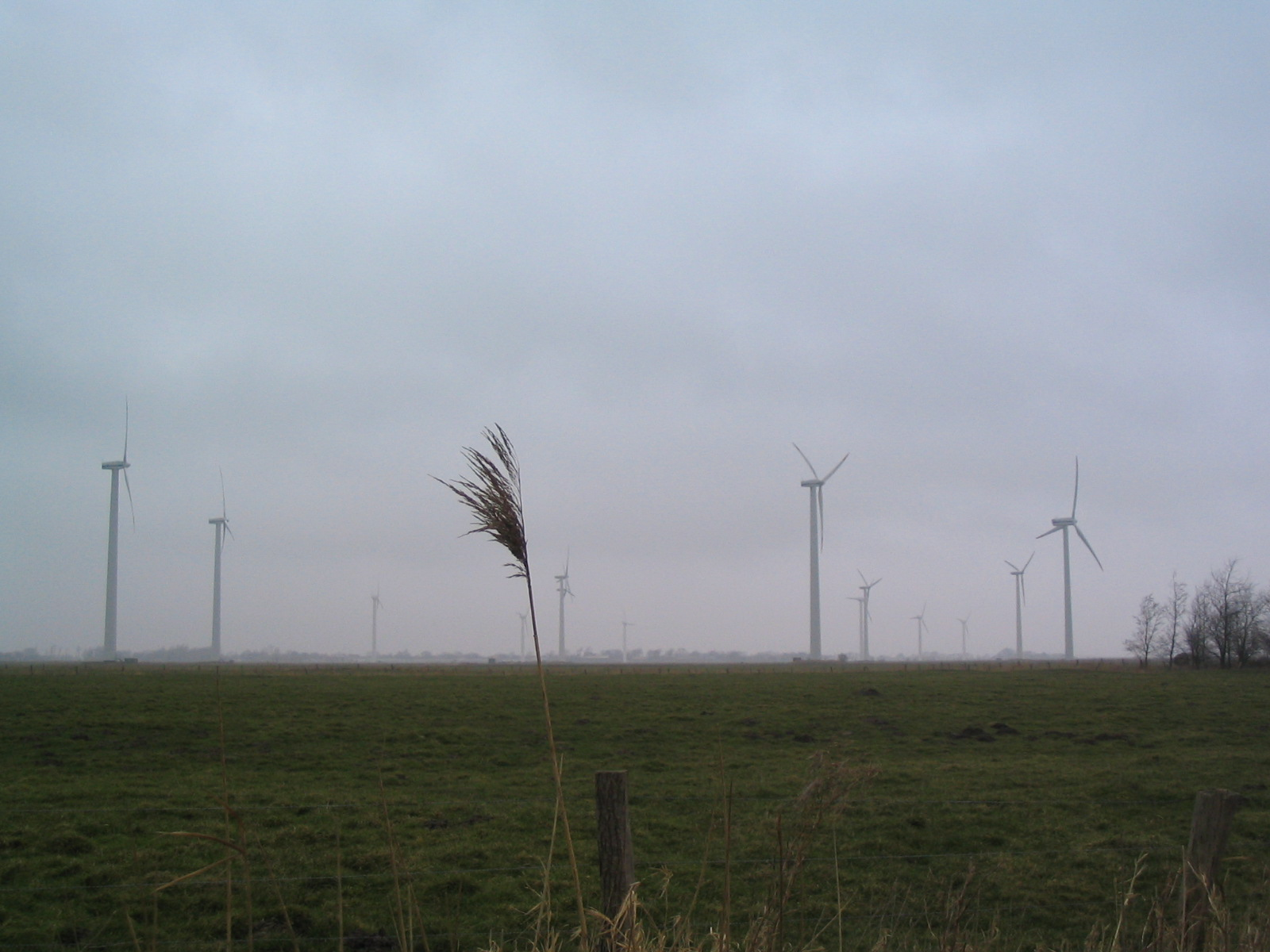
Windmills near Wesselburen
