= Weddingstedt (Amt Kirchspielslandgemeinde) =

Coordinates: 54.233°N 9.100°E

- Former amt
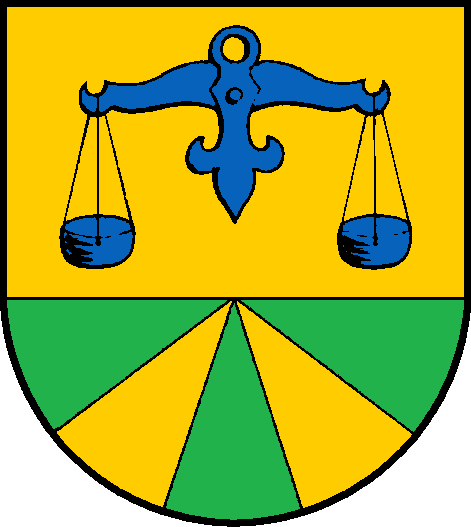
- Coat of arms

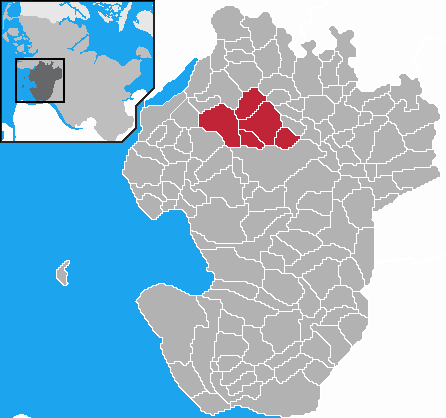
- Map of Dithmarschen highlighting Weddingstedt
- Country: Germany
- State: Schleswig-Holstein
- District: Dithmarschen
- Disestablished: 1 January 2008
- Region seat: Weddingstedt

Area
  - Total: 64 km^{2} (25 sq mi)

Kirchspielslandgemeinde Weddingstedt was an Amt ("collective municipality") in the district of Dithmarschen, in Schleswig-Holstein, Germany. Its seat was in Weddingstedt. In January 2008, it was merged with the Amt Kirchspielslandgemeinde Heide-Land and the municipality Norderwöhrden to form the Amt Kirchspielslandgemeinde Heider Umland.

The Amt Kirchspielslandgemeinde Weddingstedt consisted of the following municipalities (with population in 2005):

1. Neuenkirchen (1.044)
2. Ostrohe (963)
3. Stelle-Wittenwurth (486)
4. Weddingstedt (2.321)
5. Wesseln (1.352)
