= Heide-Land =

Coordinates: 54°09′N 9°04′E

- Former amt
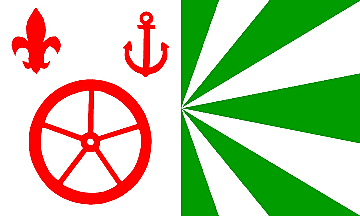
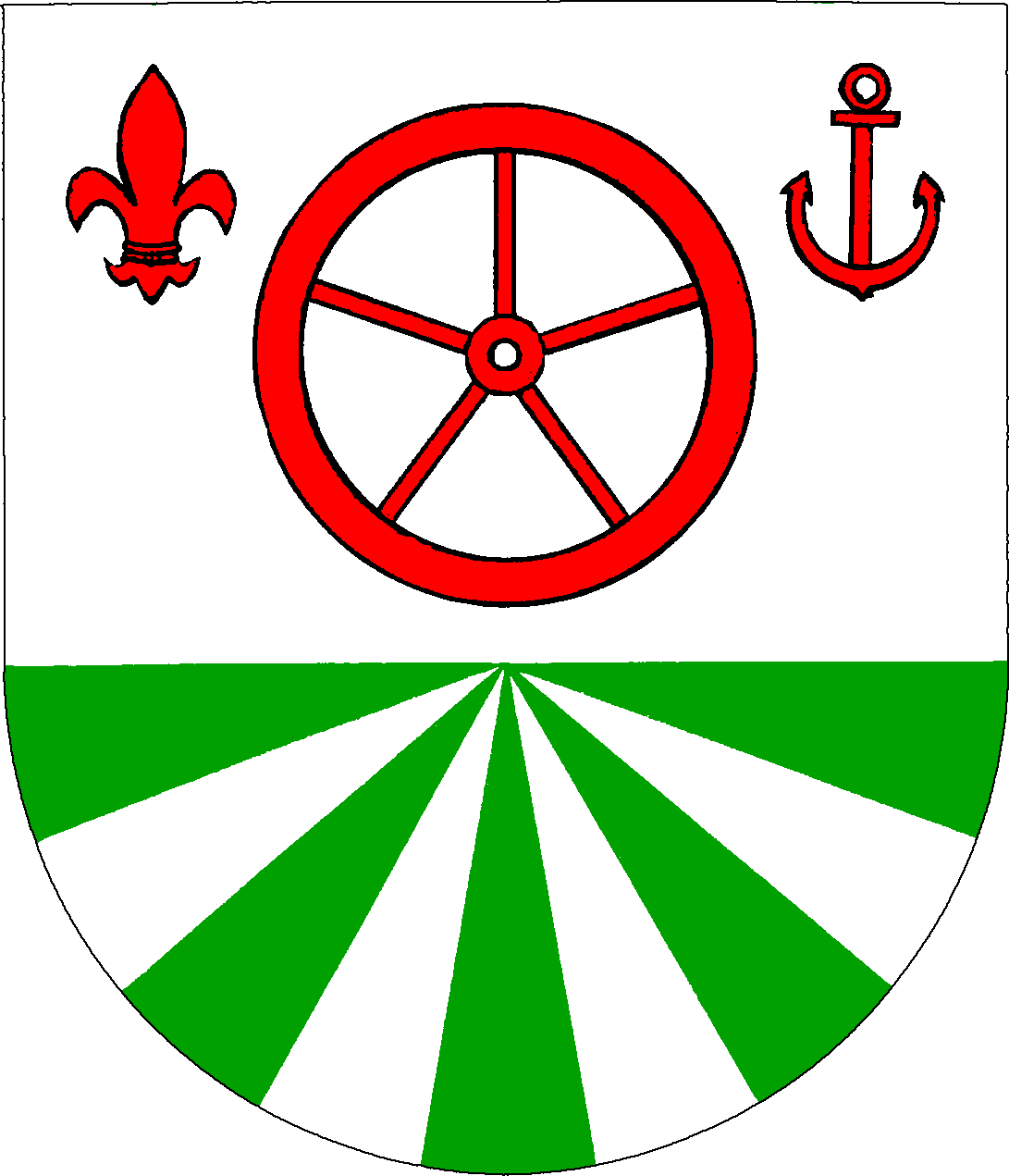
- Flag Coat of arms

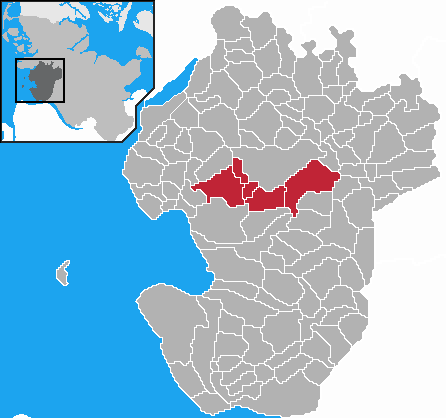
- Map of Dithmarschen highlighting Heide-Land
- Country: Germany
- State: Schleswig-Holstein
- District: Dithmarschen
- Disestablished: 2008-01-01
- Region seat: Heide

Area
  - Total: 75 km^{2} (29 sq mi)

Kirchspielslandgemeinde Heide-Land was an Amt ("collective municipality") in the district of Dithmarschen, in Schleswig-Holstein, Germany. It was situated around Heide, which was the seat of the Amt, but not part of it. In January 2008, it was merged with the Amt Kirchspielslandgemeinde Weddingstedt and the municipality Norderwöhrden to form the Amt Kirchspielslandgemeinde Heider Umland.

The Amt Kirchspielslandgemeinde Heide-Land consisted of the following municipalities (with population in 2005):

1. Hemmingstedt (2.989)
2. Lieth (396)
3. Lohe-Rickelshof (1.942)
4. Nordhastedt (2.753)
5. Wöhrden (1.334)
