= Max Friedrich Koch =

German painter (1859–1930)

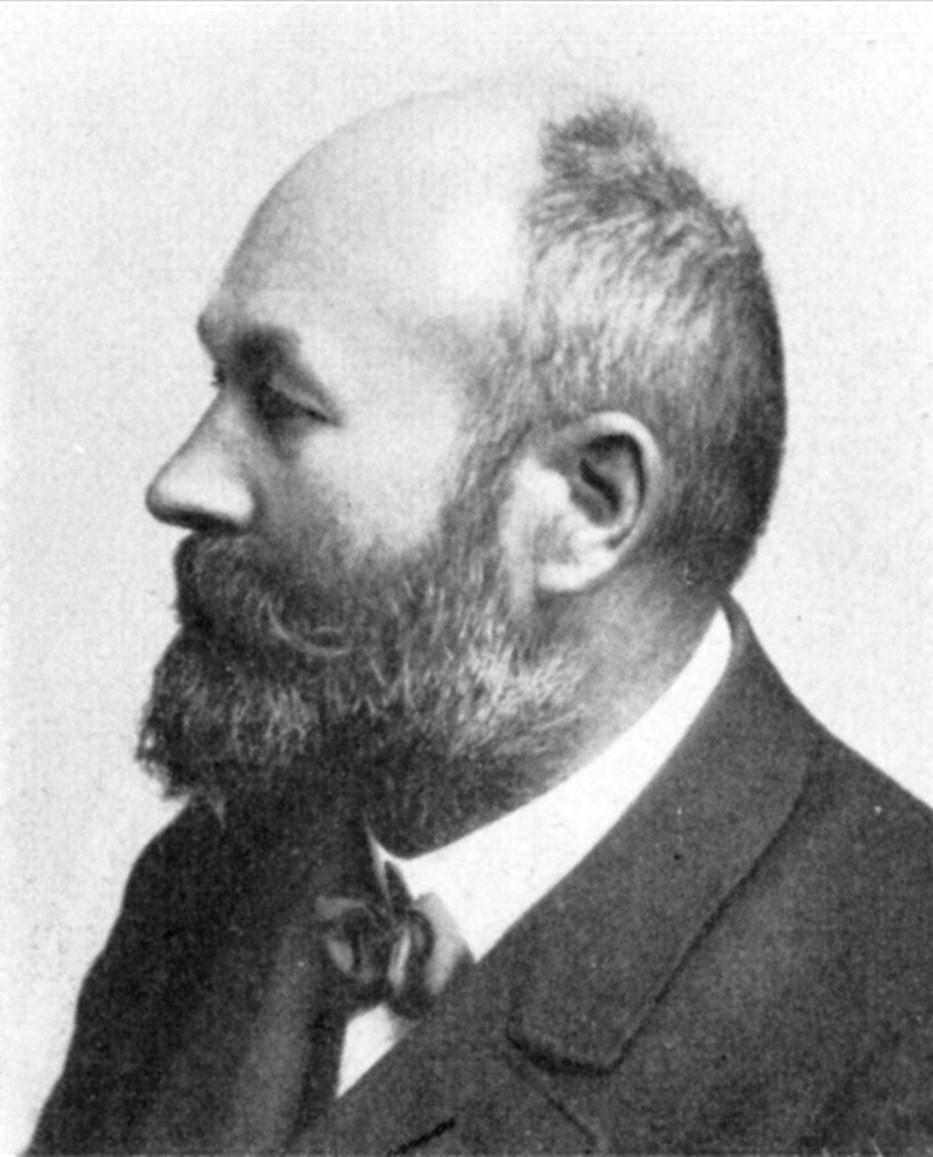
- Born: 24 November 1859; Berlin, Kingdom of Prussia
- Died: 18 February 1930 (aged 70); Sacrow (Potsdam), Weimar Republic
- Occupations: artist, art professor, photographer
- Known for: painting, photography

Max Friedrich Koch (24 November 1859, Berlin – 18 February 1930, Sacrow, Potsdam) was a German history painter. Later as a professor he taught art at the Unterrichtsanstalt des Kunstgewerbemuseums Berlin (Teaching Institute of the Decorative Arts Museum Berlin); head of the academic master's studio for monumental painting, theatrical and decorative painting.

Koch not only painted but also explored photography in the late 1800s, publishing two art nude model study works in collotype. These works were posed and published according to artistic and academic criteria. The first, titled Freilicht (Heft I) [Open-Air (Vol. I)], was followed by Der Akt (Heft II) [The Nude (Vol. II)], the latter in collaboration with the architect and sculptor Otto Rieth (1858–1911). Koch's art nudes became known to every artist and art student of that period. As a history painter, he also achieved recognition in wider art circles.

== Biography ==
Koch came from a family of artists where he received his first learning in painting. His father, Carl, and older brother Georg, were both painters. The three of them often worked together on large commissions and occasionally collaborated with the maritime artist Hans Bohrdt. His younger brother, Friedrich, was a composer and music teacher.

Koch attended the Teaching Institute of the Decorative Arts Museum Berlin, where he was a student of professor Ernst Johann Schaller and formative of professor Moritz Meurer. Koch would later be described as a Schaller-student in everything, but would moreover surpass his master; Koch was much more generous, gripping and powerful in his monumental painting, and even more sensitive and intimate in his small-scale painting. From 1876 to 1877, Koch undertook a study trip to Italy, with the help of a scholarship, and completed his studies upon returning to Berlin. Beginning in 1879, Koch worked with Friedrich von Thiersch, decorating the Alte Oper concert hall in Frankfurt am Main. The year 1881 found him in Paris, at the École Nationale Supérieure des Beaux-Arts, working with Pierre-Victor Galland.

In 1883, Koch returned to Berlin and became successor at the decorative arts museum teaching institute in Berlin to professor Moritz Meurer, who had retired himself at age 44 to live permanently in Rome. Koch would hold this position until 1924 when his successor and former student Max Seliger was selected to replace Koch, an equal honor for both master and student, and who would continue Koch's legacy and the works of the "Ernst Johannes Schaller-period". During his time, Koch became eminent for his work on several panoramas. The first was in 1886, together with Alexander Kips, for the Jubilee Exhibition of the Prussian Academy of Arts, depicting the Temple of Zeus, in honor of the recent discovery of the Pergamon Altar, which was being brought to Berlin and reassembled. This was replaced in 1888, with a panorama by Koch and his brother Georg, that depicted the Great Fire of Rome. In 1891 this was, in turn, replaced by a collaboration between all three Kochs and Bohrdt, showing Kaiser Wilhelm II, on his way to visit the Bosporus Germans.

Koch also decorated numerous public and private buildings with monumental historical scenes, which were very popular during the Imperial Prussia period. This included areas in the Prussian House of Lords, the Prussian House of Representatives, and the Berlin-Brandenburg Academy of Sciences and Humanities, as well as in the Wertheim and Tietz department stores. Outside of Berlin, the Lübecker Rathaus (Lübeck Town Hall) is a notable example.

At the beginning of the 20th century, Koch served as an expert witness for the defendant in a prosecution test case brought against the publisher of Die Schönheit. The publisher was accused by a civil keeper group (Volkswartbund) called the "Cologne Men's Association to Combat Public Immorality" (Kölner Männerverein zur Bekämpfung der öffentlicher Unsittlichkeit) of disseminating some photographic depictions of undesired nudity. Die Schönheit (The Beauty) was a monthly journal for art and life, published between 1903 and 1914 in Berlin, Leipzig, and Vienna, and again in Dresden from 1915 until 1932. The journal was elaborately designed in German Jugendstil (Art Nouveau), produced on art paper, and was one the first to include "culturally nude" life photographs by various past and present photographers. The Reich Court of Justice in Leipzig subsequently acquitted the journalist and publisher Karl Vanselow in two test cases in 1906 and 1909, ruling that "the representation of naked people for the purpose of publicity for Freikörperkultur (free body culture) is declared as not punishable".

== Publications ==
=== Photography ===
Photography works and model studies in open air nature and studio, according to artistic and academia criteria

- "Freilicht" (Book I), by Professor Max Koch, published by Internationaler Kunstverlag M. Bauer & Co., Leipzig, ca. 1890s
- "Der Akt" (Book II) and in French publication "L'Act (La Modèle humaine)", by Professor Max Koch & Architect and Sculptor Otto Rieth, published by Internationaler Kunstverlag M. Bauer & Co., Leipzig, 1894

== Selected works ==
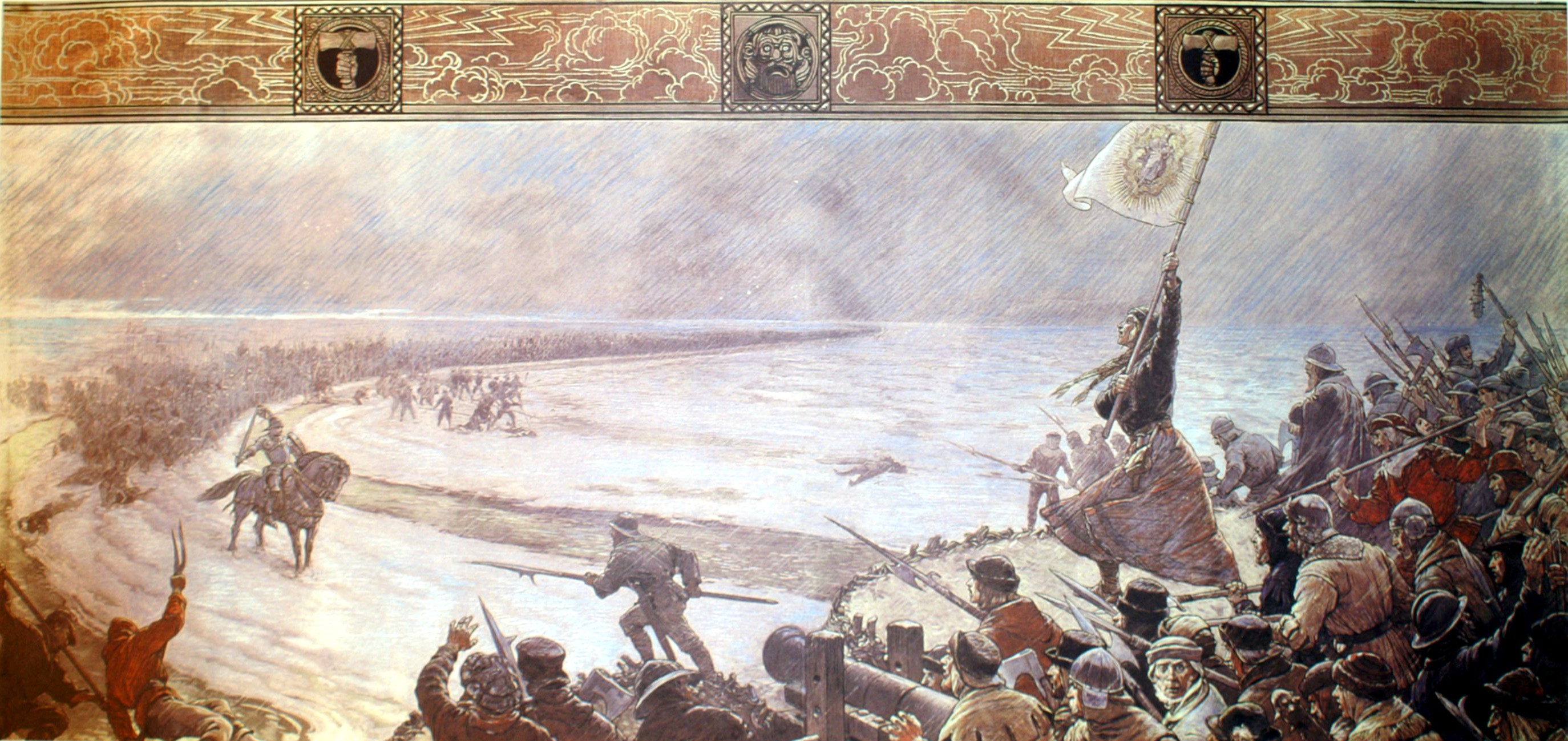
Schlacht bei Hemmingstedt (Battle of Hemmingstedt), mural in the assembly hall of the County Hall (Kreishaus) of the former Süderdithmarschen District in Meldorf, 1910

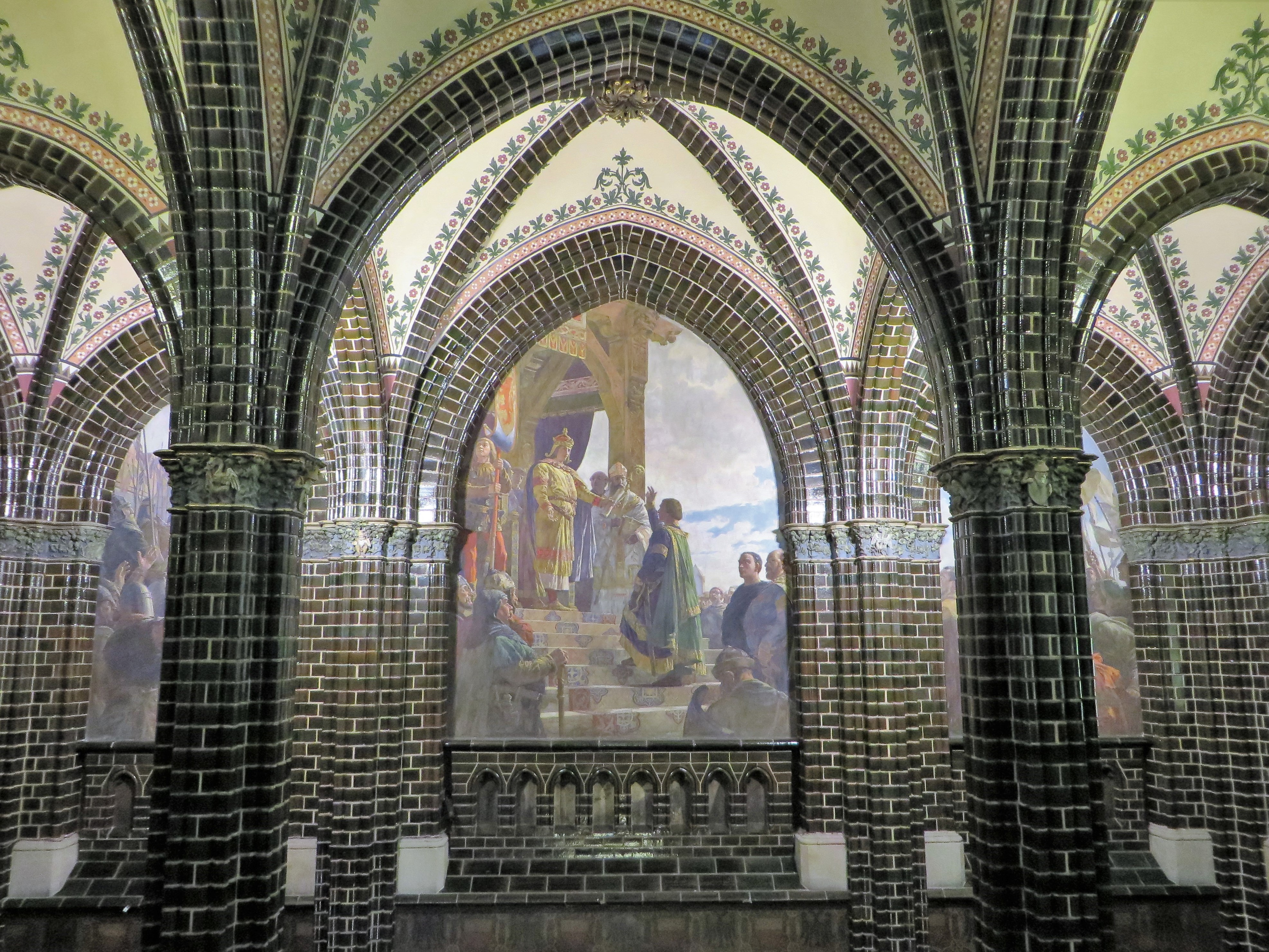
Mural in Lübeck Town Hall staircase with scenes from the founding of the city

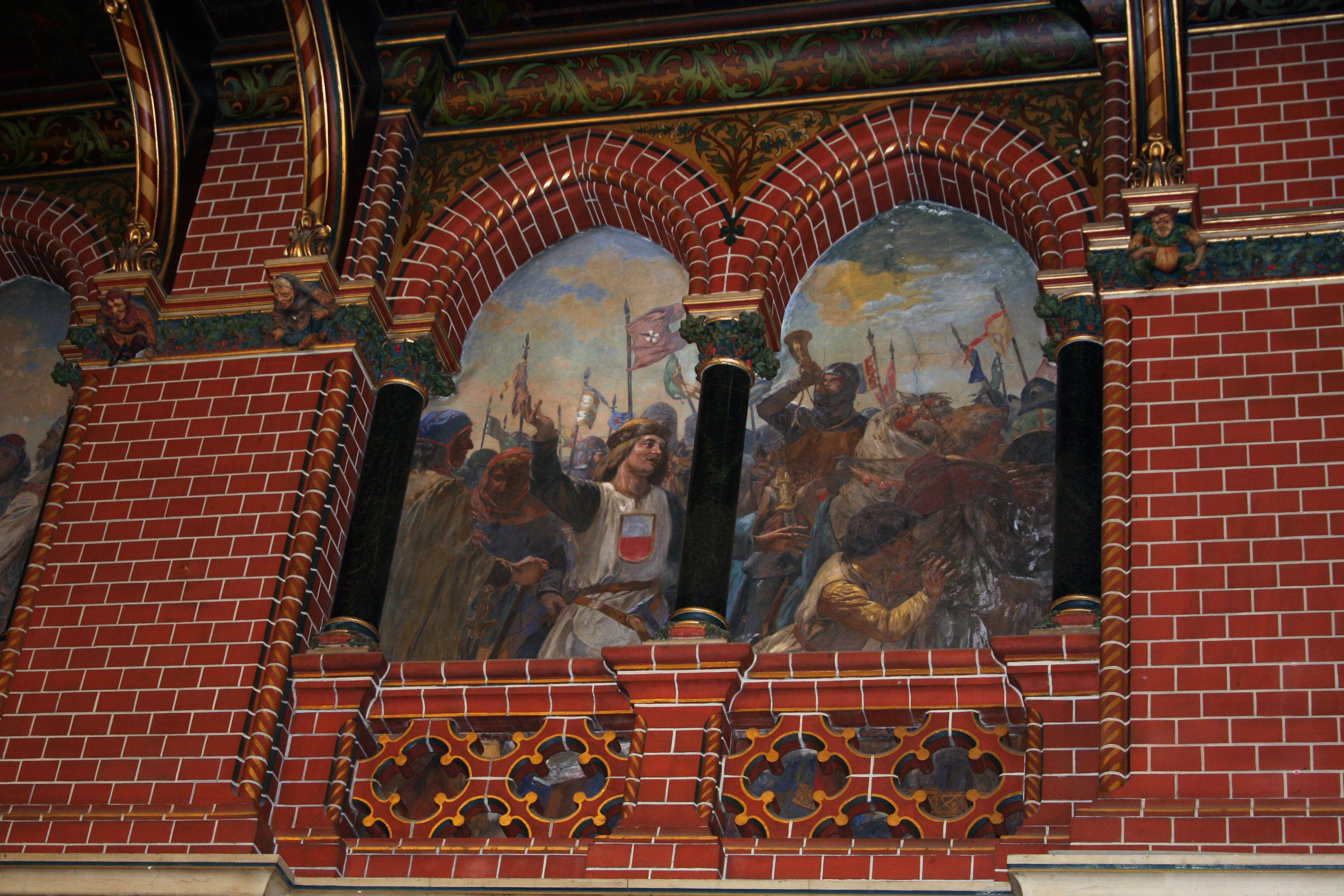
Mural in Lübeck Town Hall

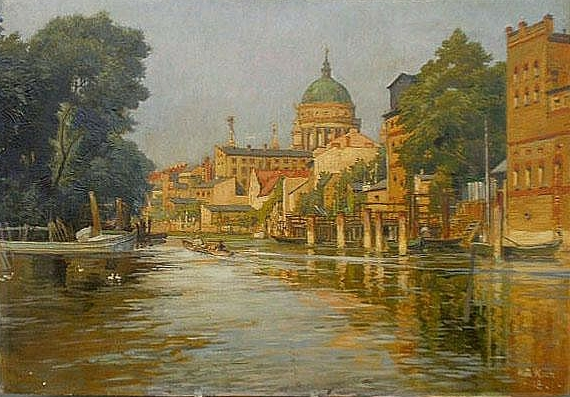
Ansicht von Potsdam - Die Alte Fahrt mit Blick auf die Nikolaikirche (View of Potsdam - The "Alte Fahrt" waterway with a view of St. Nicholas Church), Potsdam, 1918

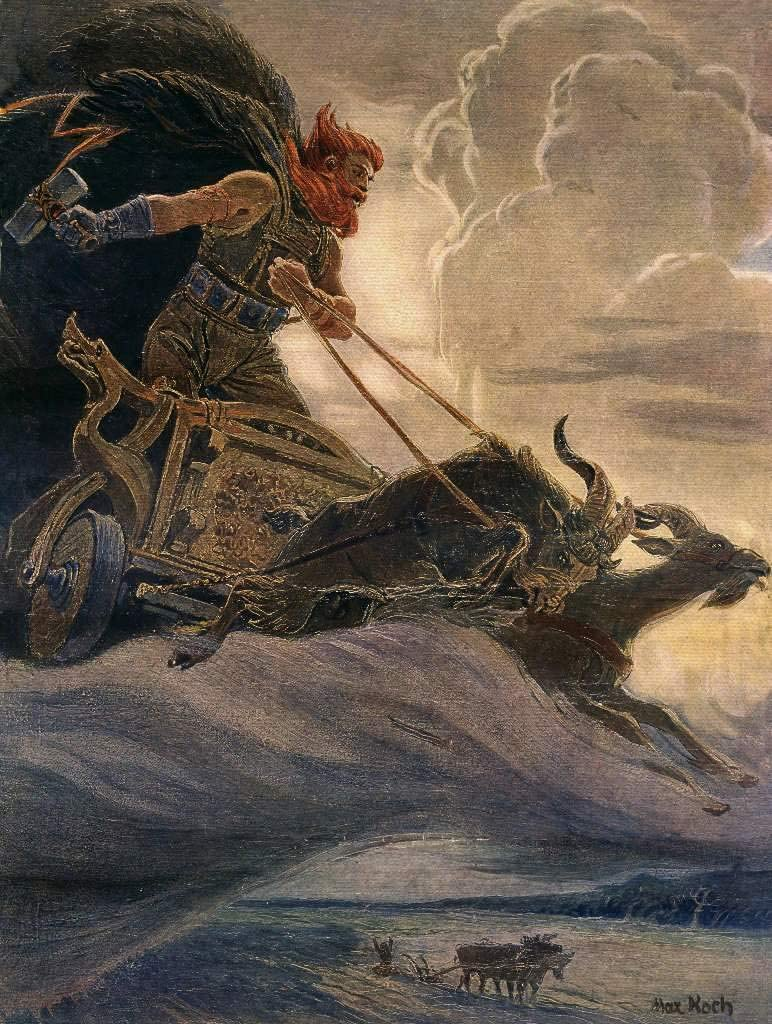
Donar (Thor), ca. 1905

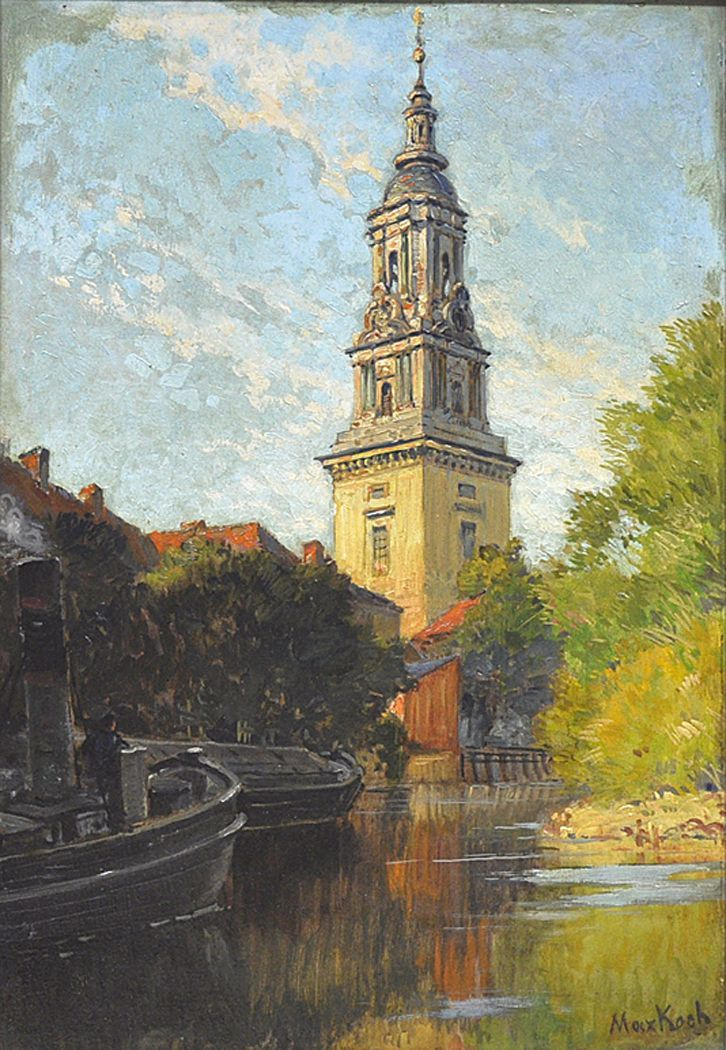
Heilig Geist Kirche (Holy Spirit Church), Potsdam

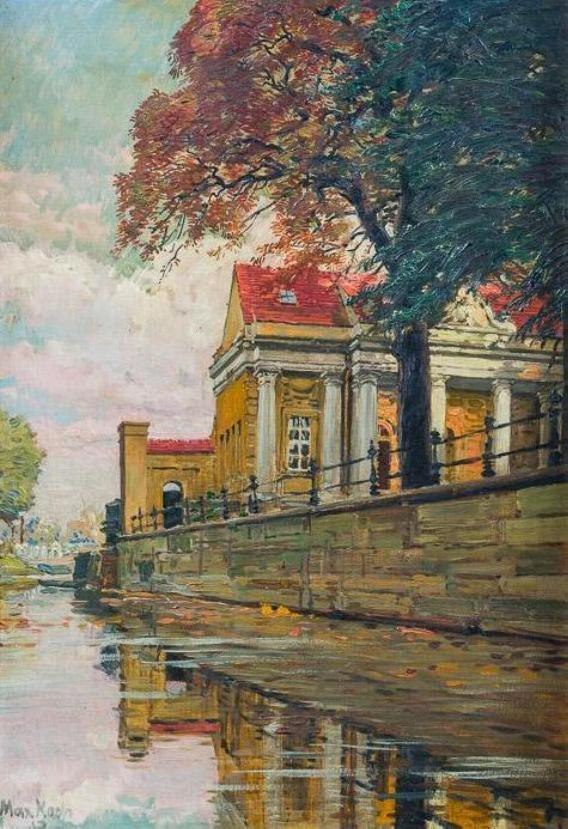
Kellertor (Cellar Gate Guard, Potsdam city gates), Potsdam, ca. 1912

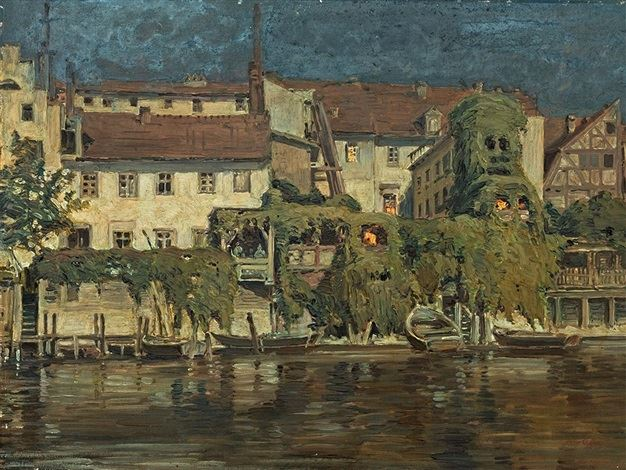
Hinterhöfe an der Alten Fahrt bei Vollmond (Backyards on the "Alte Fahrt" waterway by full moon), Potsdam, 1917

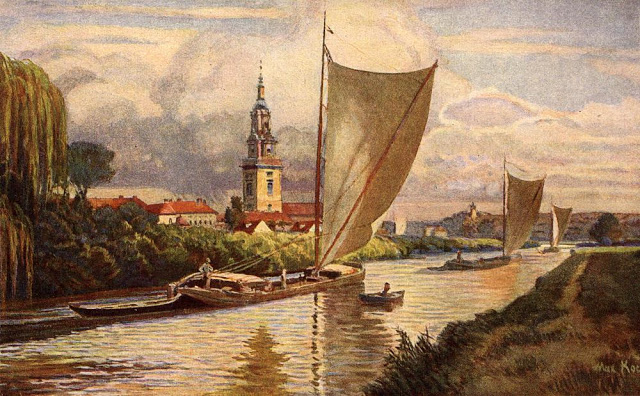
Zillen on the Havel watercourse, Potsdam

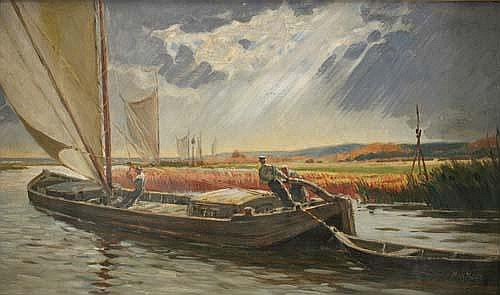
Zillen on the Havel watercourse, Potsdam

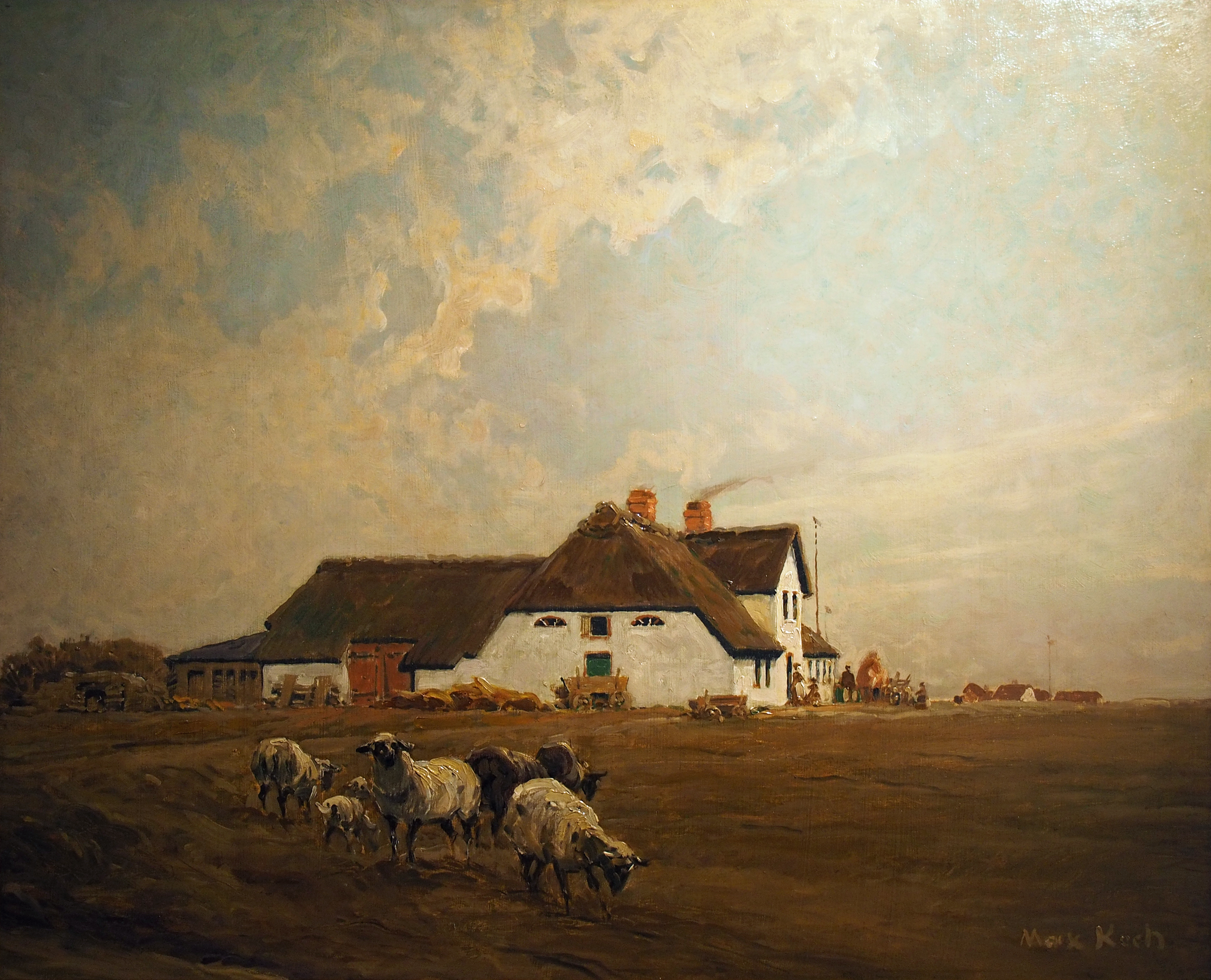
Ostfriesischer Hof (East Frisia farmhouse), ca. 1900

== Bibliography ==
- "Koch, Max Friedrich". In: Hans Vollmer (Ed.): Allgemeines Lexikon der Bildenden Künstler von der Antike bis zur Gegenwart, Vol.21: Knip–Krüger. E. A. Seemann, Leipzig 1927, pps. 90–91.
- "Max Koch". In: Hans Vollmer (Ed.): Allgemeines Lexikon der bildenden Künstler des XX. Jahrhunderts. Vol.3: K–P. E. A. Seemann, Leipzig 1956, pg.75.
- Biography, paintings and criticism @ the Max Friedrich Koch Blogspot (in German)
