= Nabada =

Yearly parade in Germany

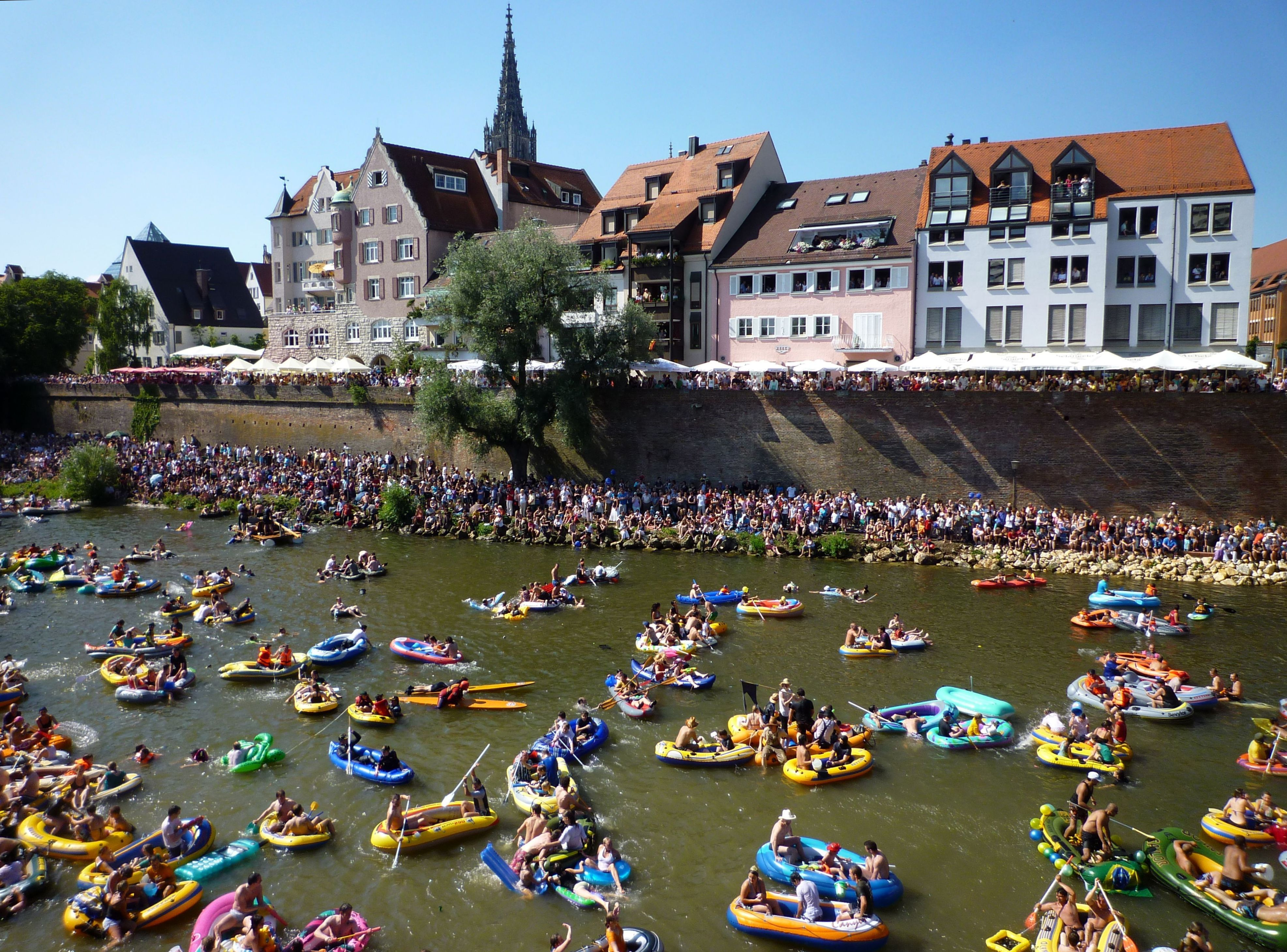
Nabada 2010

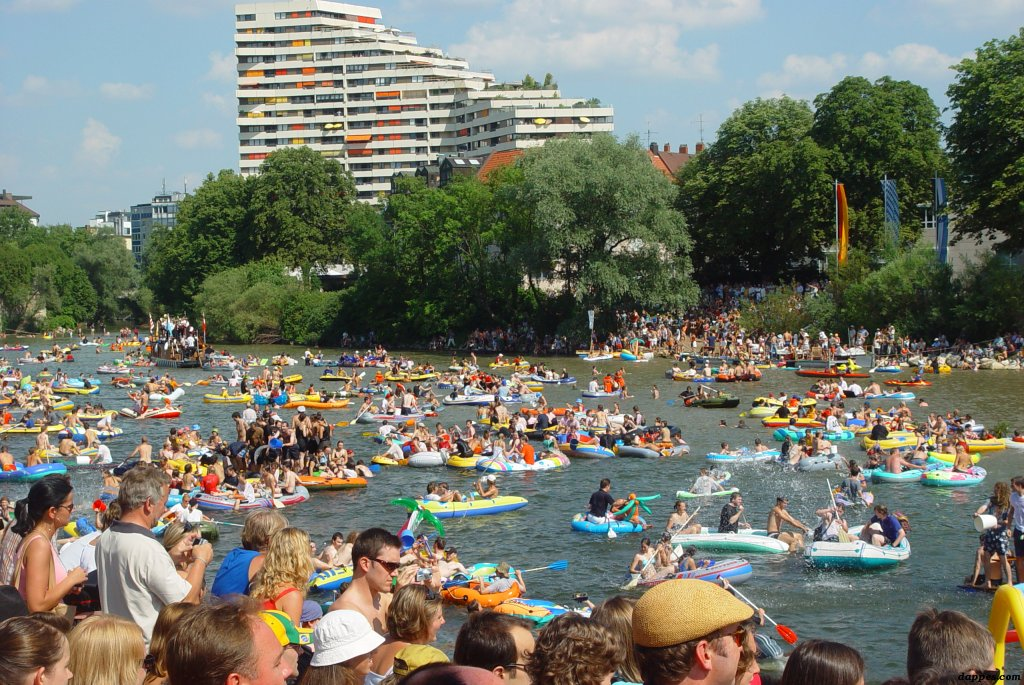
Nabada on July 24th, 2006

Nabada ([ˈnaːbaːdɜ], schwäbisch for "Hinunterbaden" -- "swim down") is a traditional parade on the Danube, in Ulm, Germany. It takes place every year on Schwörmontag, the second to last Monday of July.

== Origins ==
The Nabada is based on several ancient events: As early as 1800, it was mentioned that young people swam down the Danube to get to restaurants and took their clothes with them in tubs. An old church festival custom described the “Bäuerles Hinunterfahren”, which literally translates to “farmers driving down”. Here the peasant couple was driven down the Danube on boards that were placed over two Zillen, which are wooden boats about 7 meters long, and pushed into the river by rocking the boards. The first official Nabada took place in 1927. In the late 1960s, the Nabada was opened to all participants. Previously, this was only permitted for the organizing clubs.

== Activities ==
The Nabada takes place in the afternoon of Schwörmontag, after the so-called Schwörfeier, an event in which Ulm’s Mayor gives a speech, in which he renews his oath to serve the people of the city, rich or poor, dating back to the 14th century.

From 4:00 p.m., hundreds of participants are in the water of the Danube, drifting down the river on self-made boats, rubber boats, and traditional boats made out of wood, called Zillen and Ulmer Schachteln and splashing each other over the course of 7 km. The official side does not want the spraying of spectators on the riverbank, not only because of complaints from soaked spectators but also because there have already been injuries from water buckets, water guns, etc. The participants are cheered on by the crowd gathered on the riverside.

There are various official themed boats built by organizations in the week before the Nabada. The whole thing is similar to the big carnival parades in Cologne and Düsseldorf since local, regional, and national topics, as well as people, are humorously made fun of. Several music clubs, which travel down the Danube in swaying Zillen, contribute to the lively atmosphere. The best-themed boat and the best music club win a prize.

This spectacle can last two to three hours, depending on the weather and water levels.

Afterward, the festivities continue in the streets and bars of Ulm and Neu-Ulm.

If the Nabada has to be canceled, for example, due to bad weather, red baskets are attached to the Ulm Minster to inform the people. On July 21, 2008, the Nabada was canceled for the first time in 23 years, due to flooding and the resulting strong currents of the Danube. However, the other festivities on the Danube and in the city took place as usual.

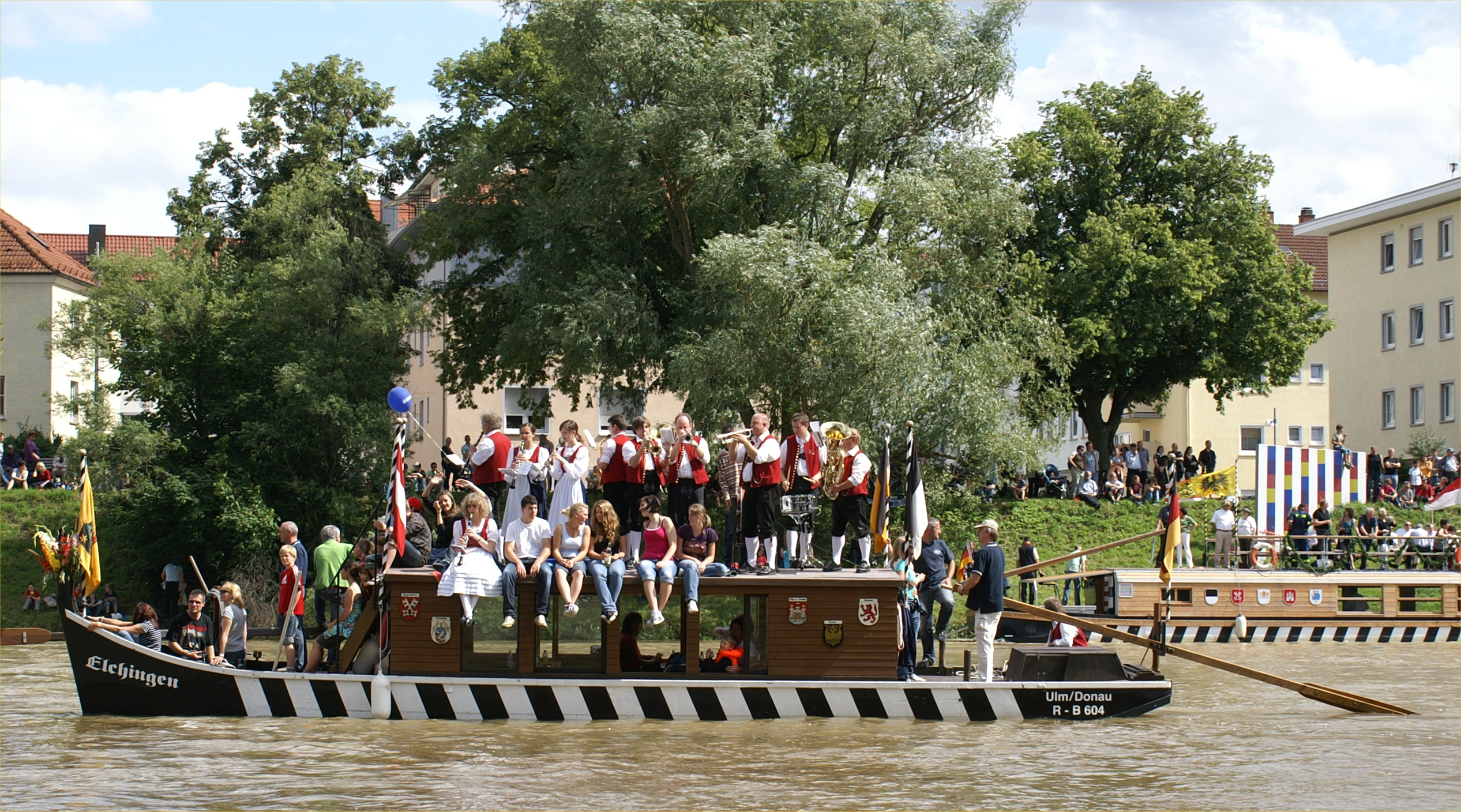
Traditional boat Ulmer Schachtel "Elchingen"
