= Epenwöhrden =

- Municipality
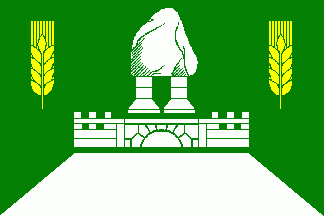
- Flag Coat of arms

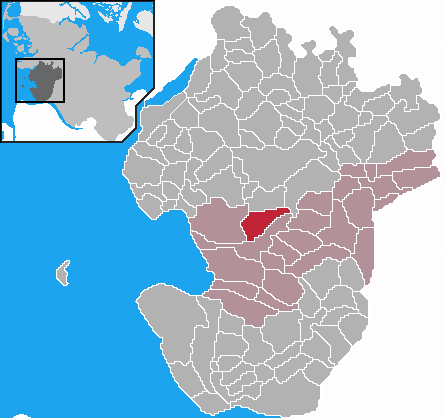
- Location of Epenwöhrden within Dithmarschen district
- Interactive map of Epenwöhrden
- Location within Germany Location within Schleswig-Holstein
- Coordinates: 54°7′N 9°3′E
- Country: Germany
- State: Schleswig-Holstein
- District: Dithmarschen
- Municipal assoc.: Mitteldithmarschen
- Subdivisions: 4

Government
  - Mayor: Reimer Hinrichs

Area
  - Total: 13.52 km^{2} (5.22 sq mi)
- Elevation: 0 m (0 ft)

Population (2025-12-31)
  - Total: 744
  - Density: 55.0/km^{2} (143/sq mi)
- Time zone: UTC+01:00 (CET)
  - Summer (DST): UTC+02:00 (CEST)
- Postal codes: 25704
- Dialling codes: 04832
- Vehicle registration: HEI
- Website: www.epenwoehrden.de

Epenwöhrden is a municipality in the district of Dithmarschen, in Schleswig-Holstein, Germany.

== History ==
Epenwöhrden, south of Hemmingstedt, was the venue of the Battle of Hemmingstedt. In 1500 the militia of the then Farmers' Republic of Ditmarsh, led by Wulf Isebrand, defeated an army of Hans, king of the Kalmar Union, composed of Jutes, Holsteiners, and Dutch mercenaries.
