= Heider Umland =

- Amt
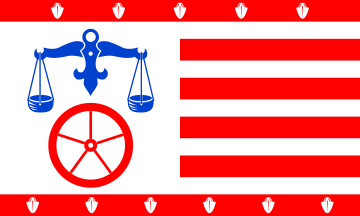
- Flag Coat of arms

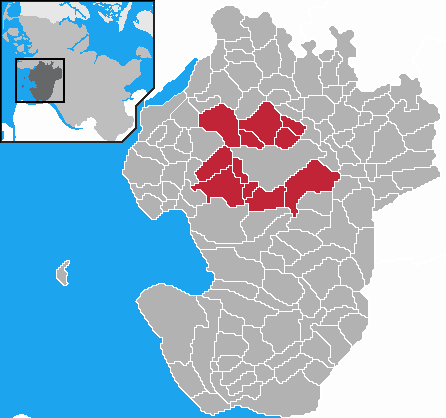
- Map of Dithmarschen highlighting Heider Umland
- Interactive map of Heider Umland
- Location within Germany Location within Schleswig-Holstein
- Coordinates: 54°09′N 9°04′E
- Country: Germany
- State: Schleswig-Holstein
- District: Dithmarschen
- Founded: 2008
- Seat: Heide
- Subdivisions: 11 municipalities

Government
  - Mayor: Hartmut Busdorf

Area
  - Total: 157.02 km^{2} (60.63 sq mi)

Population (2025-12-31)
  - Total: 15,409
  - Density: 98.134/km^{2} (254.17/sq mi)
- Time zone: UTC+01:00 (CET)
  - Summer (DST): UTC+02:00 (CEST)
- Website: amt-heider-umland.de

Kirchspielslandgemeinde Heider Umland is an Amt ("collective municipality") in the district of Dithmarschen, in Schleswig-Holstein, Germany. It is situated around Heide, which is the seat of the Amt, but not part of it. It was formed on 1 January 2008 from the former Ämter Kirchspielslandgemeinde Heide-Land and Kirchspielslandgemeinde Weddingstedt and the municipality Norderwöhrden.

The Amt Kirchspielslandgemeinde Heider Umland consists of the following municipalities:

1. Hemmingstedt
2. Lieth
3. Lohe-Rickelshof
4. Neuenkirchen
5. Norderwöhrden
6. Nordhastedt
7. Ostrohe
8. Stelle-Wittenwurth
9. Weddingstedt
10. Wesseln
11. Wöhrden
