= Georg Karl Koch =

German painter, illustrator and lithographer

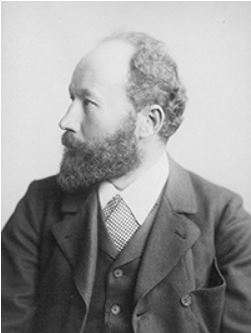
Georg Karl Koch (date unknown)

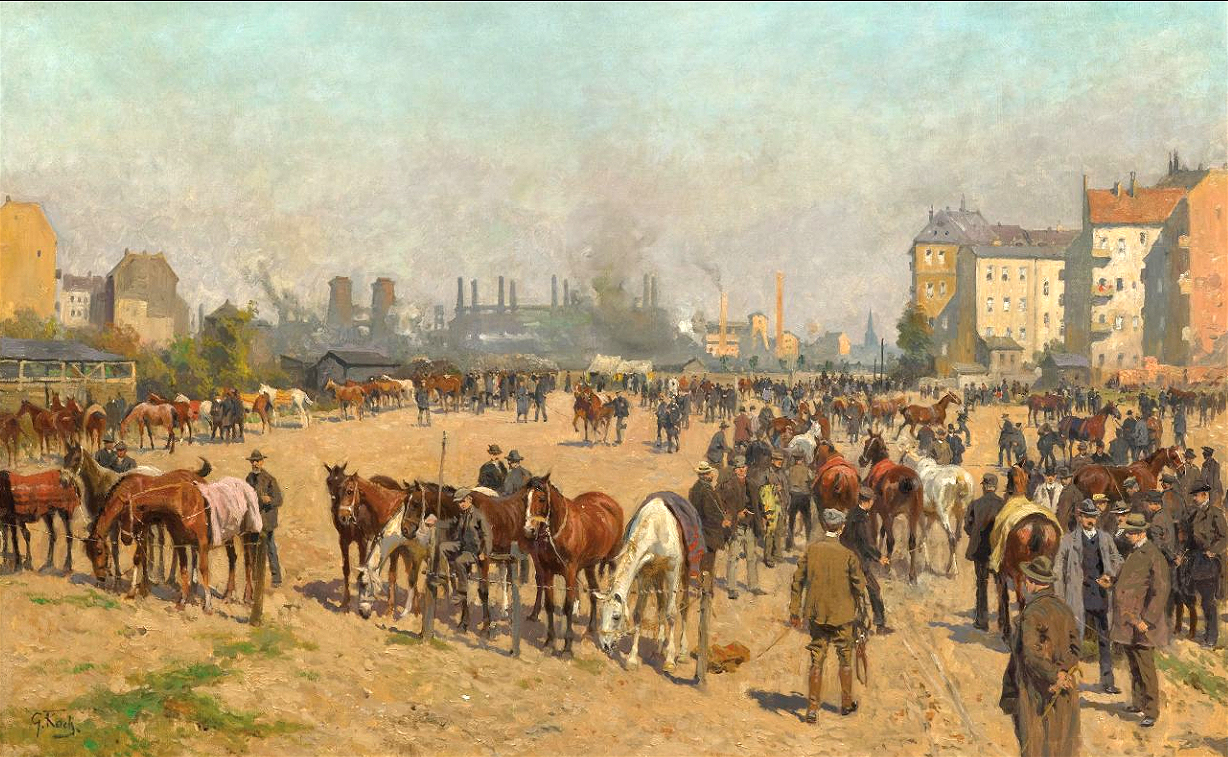
Horse Market in Berlin

Georg Karl Koch (27 February 1857 – 3 November 1927) was a German painter, illustrator and lithographer. Most of his works feature horses; primarily in hunting scenes. Some sources give his year of death as 1931 or 1936.

== Biography ==
He was born in Berlin. He came from a family of artists. His father, Carl, and younger brother Max, were both painters. The three of them often worked together on large commissions and occasionally collaborated with the maritime artist, Hans Bohrdt.

His first art lessons came from his father, after which he enrolled at the Prussian Academy of the Arts, where his primary teachers were Carl Steffeck, Paul Friedrich Meyerheim and Karl Gussow.

In 1874, he had his debut at an Academy exhibition, where he presented his "Forest Hunting Party with Deer". After completing his studies, he produced panoramas and dioramas of Berlin, Leipzig, Dresden and some cities in the United States. Soon, however, he turned to animal painting; primarily focused on horses, presented in a variety of contexts, although a majority of these works are hunting or battle scenes. He also created lithographs and wood cuts.

From 1896 to 1927, he was a member of the Academy; "Fine Art" section. In 1899, he was named a Professor there. In 1914, he succeeded Paul Friedrich Meyerheim in the Chair of animal painting at the Berlin University of the Arts. He died in Berlin.

== Sources ==
- "Koch, Georg Carl". In: Hans Vollmer (Ed.): Allgemeines Lexikon der Bildenden Künstler von der Antike bis zur Gegenwart, Vol. 21: Knip–Krüger. E. A. Seemann, Leipzig 1927, pps.73–74.
- "Koch, Georg" @ Deutsche Biographie
- "Georg Koch" @ RKD
