= Karl Vanselow =

Karl Vanselow (20 March 1877, Schönlanke – 28 December 1959, Berlin) was a German writer, publisher, photographer and Esperantist.

== Works ==
- Mirchen der Liebe (1898), a short volume of prose
- Von Weib und Welt (1901), a volume of poetry
- Esperanto (1948), an Esperanto textbook

== Gallery ==
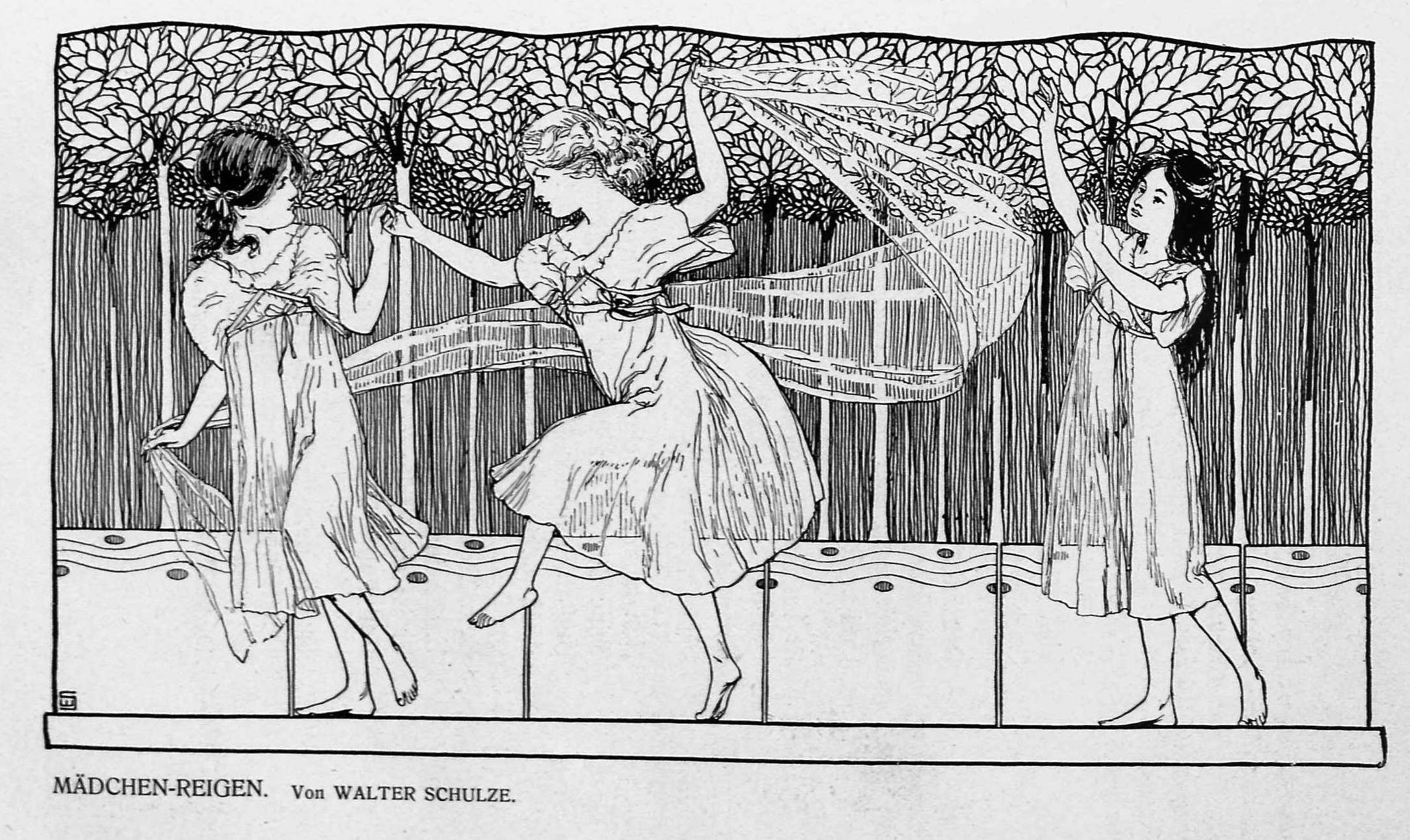
"Mädchen-Reigen", in Die Schönheit, 4(4), 1906

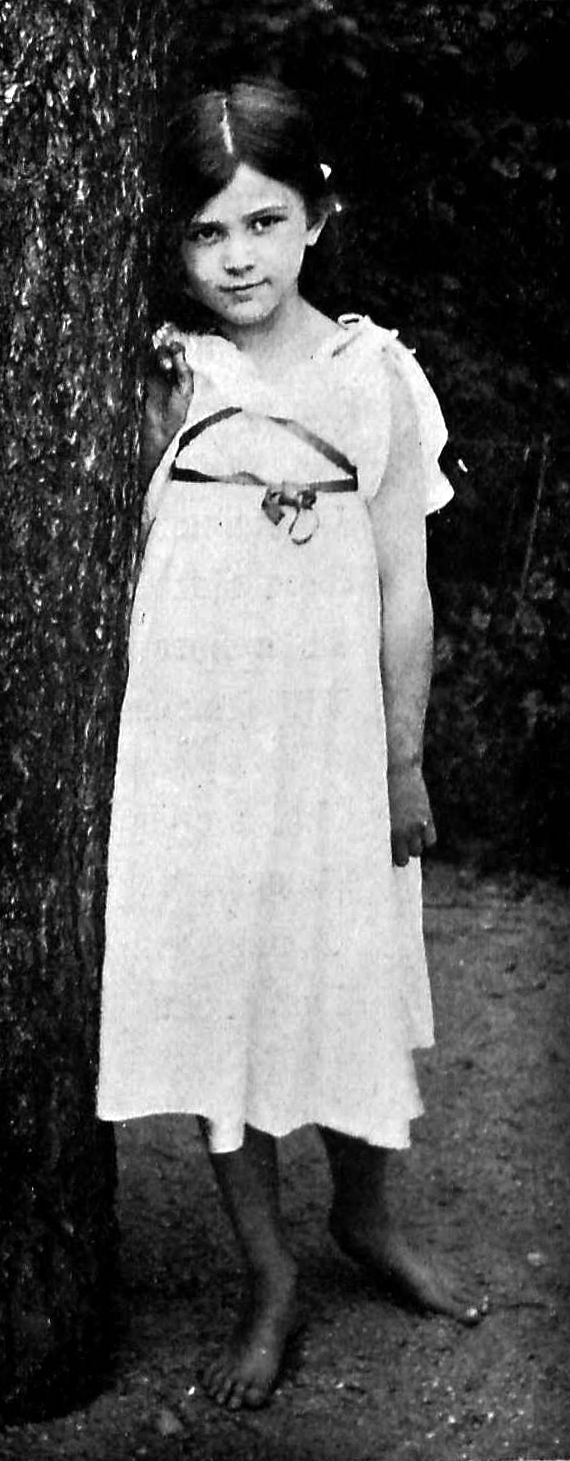
Photo of the girl Temple Duncan, in Die Schönheit, 4(4), 1906

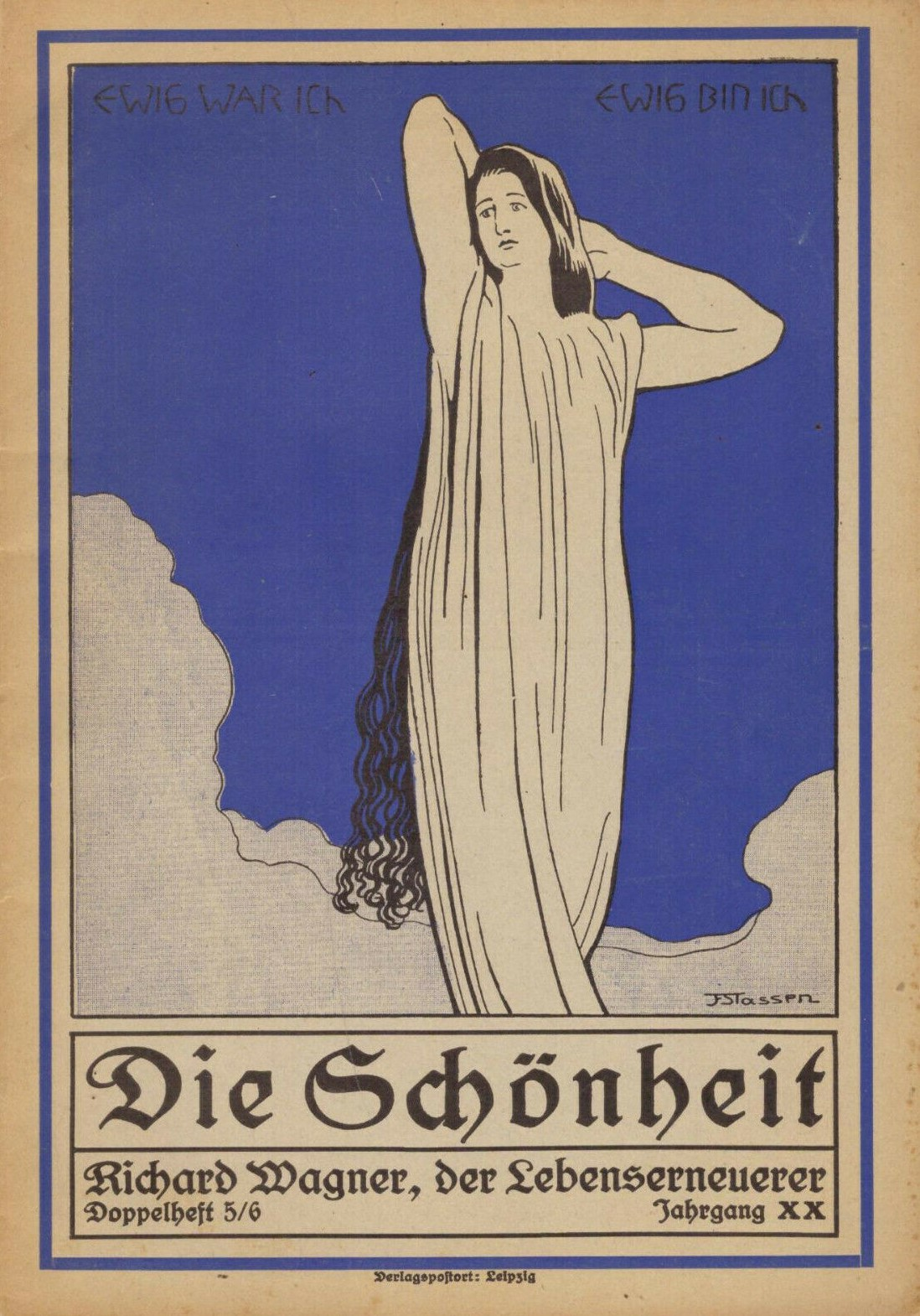
Die Schönheit, Issue 5/6, Year XX, c. 1923

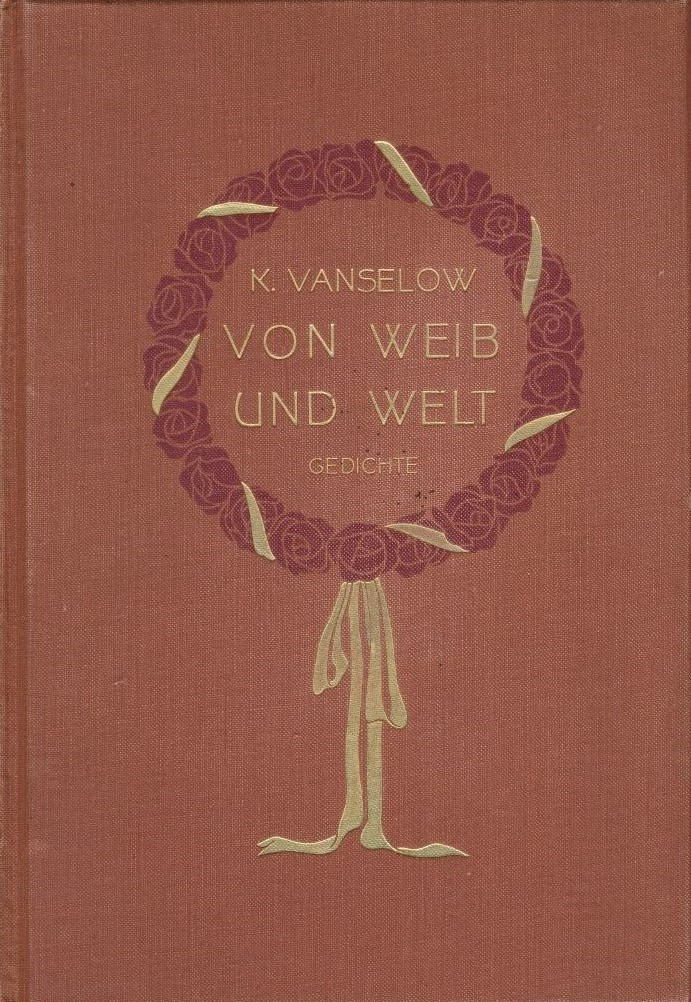
Von Weib und Welt. Gedichte. Berlin: Verlag der Schönheit, 1918

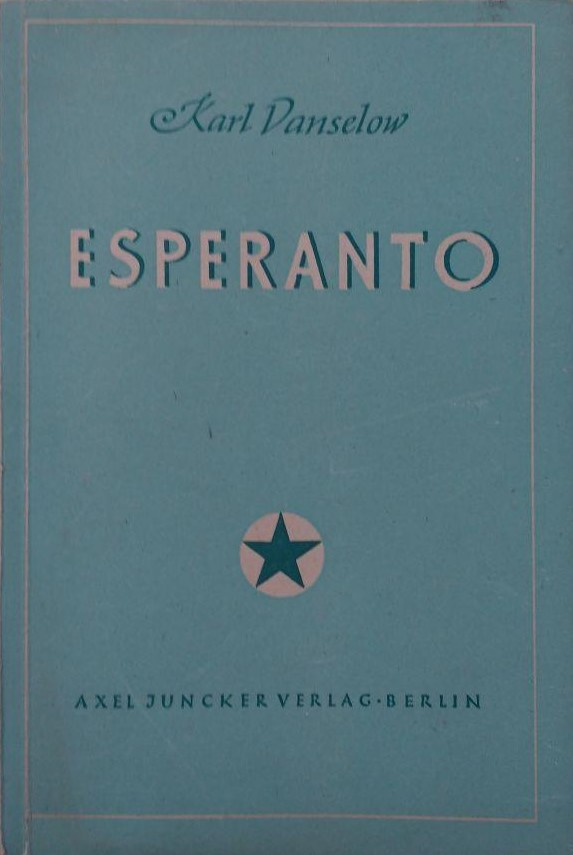
Esperanto. Berlin: Axel Juncker Verlag, 1948
