= Lieth =

- Municipality
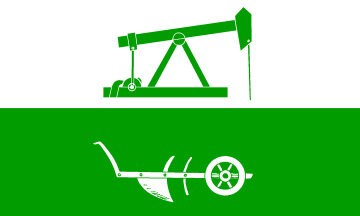
- Flag Coat of arms

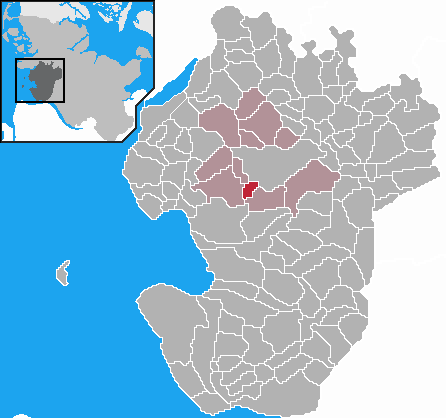
- Location of Lieth within Dithmarschen district
- Interactive map of Lieth
- Location within Germany Location within Schleswig-Holstein
- Coordinates: 54°8′N 9°3′E
- Country: Germany
- State: Schleswig-Holstein
- District: Dithmarschen
- Municipal assoc.: Heider Umland

Government
  - Mayor: Reimer Witt (CDU)

Area
  - Total: 4.66 km^{2} (1.80 sq mi)
- Elevation: 3 m (9.8 ft)

Population (2025-12-31)
  - Total: 384
  - Density: 82.4/km^{2} (213/sq mi)
- Time zone: UTC+01:00 (CET)
  - Summer (DST): UTC+02:00 (CEST)
- Postal codes: 25770
- Dialling codes: 0481
- Vehicle registration: HEI
- Website: www.amt-heide- land.de

Lieth (German pronunciation: [liːt]) is a municipality in the district of Dithmarschen, in Schleswig-Holstein, Germany.
