= Peasant republic =

Concept of a self-governing polity or entity made up of and/or by peasants

Peasant republic (a calque of the German word Bauernrepublik) is a term used to describe rural societies in the Middle Ages, especially in the Holy Roman Empire and in parts of the Nordics, in which royal, aristocratic and ecclesiastical power was unusually weak or non-existent, allowing the local farmers to enjoy a high degree of autonomy. In this context the term 'republic' does not necessarily imply the existence of the apparatus of a formal state, though this did exist in some such communities, but rather simply the absence of effective royal/princely power. Typically peasant republics were located in remote and inaccessible areas (such as marshlands and mountain valleys) which were difficult for outside authorities to interfere in, and generally too poor to attract a lot of attention.

== Examples ==
=== Frisia and the Lower Elbe ===
The German term Bauernrepublik was originally coined to refer to autonomous districts in Frisia and northwest Saxony, a region in which the tradition of 'Frisian Freedom' remained strong throughout the Middle Ages. Notable 'peasant republics' in this area included Butjadingen, Stadland, Stedingen, Land Wursten, Land Hadeln and Dithmarschen.

Some of these peasant republics disappeared through the consolidation of power in the hands of individual farmers, enabling them to set themselves up as petty lords on the feudal model, while others were annexed or conquered by neighbouring princes.

The various peasant republics in East Frisia were united under the rule of the Cirksena family in the 15th century, and in 1464 Ulrich I von Cirksena was able to declare himself Count of East Frisia. During the same period, Friesland, also known as West Frisia, was subsumed into the Burgundian Netherlands, which later became the Spanish Netherlands and ultimately the Dutch Republic. Thus Friesland is today part of the Netherlands, whereas East Frisia is part of modern Germany. After the 1234 Battle of Altenesch, the Stedinger were subjected to the Prince-Archbishop of Bremen and to the Count of Oldenburg. The Prince-Archbishops also subjected Kehdingen, and in 1524 also the Land Wursten to their rule, while the Counts of Oldenburg acquired Butjadingen and Stadland in 1514. The peasants of Hadeln were comparatively lucky; although they fell under the rule of the weak Duchy of Saxe-Lauenburg in the 13th century, the dukes were too weak to enforce their will and consequently the farmers were able to preserve much of their autonomy right up to the 19th century.

=== Scandinavia ===
The term 'peasant republic' is sometimes applied to certain communities in Scandinavia during the Viking Age and High Middle Ages, especially in Sweden, where royal power seems to have been initially somewhat weak, and in areas of modern-day Sweden that were not under the rule of the king of Sweden yet, as well as in Iceland where the Icelandic Commonwealth serves as an example of an unusually large and sophisticated peasant republic building on the same democratic traditions. Some historians have also argued that Gotland was a peasant republic before the attack by the Danes in 1361. Central for the old Scandinavian democratic traditions was the assemblies called the thing or moot.

=== The Alpine region ===
There are parallels between the situation in Friesland and that in the Swiss Confederation. In many of the Swiss cantons sovereignty was invested in the local farmers in the form of the Landsgemeinde, although executive authority was delegated to councils of 60 men. These free communities of Alpine farmers later joined with self-governing cities (such as Bern and Geneva) to form the Swiss Confederation, which was dominated by free farmers until the end of the 18th century.

Peasant republics also existed elsewhere in the Alpine region, such as in the Bregenzerwald, in what is now the far west of Austria.

Some German-language sources also speak of Bauernrepublik to describe the case of the Republic of the Escartons of Briançon, a group of mountain territories having enjoyed particular fiscal and social provisions from the 14th to the 18th centuries.

== See also ==
- Frisian Freedom
- Medieval commune
