= Wesseln =

- Municipality
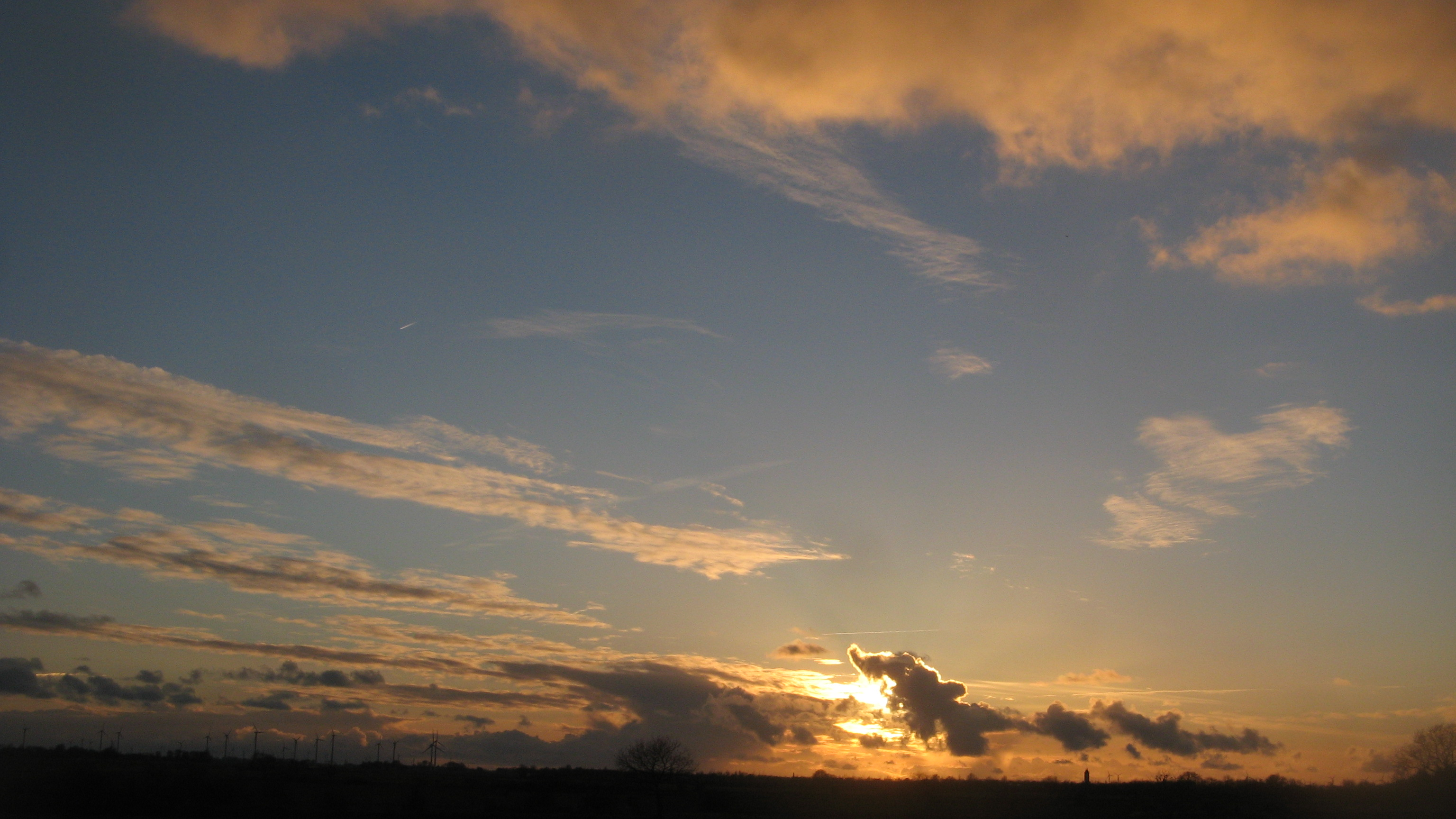

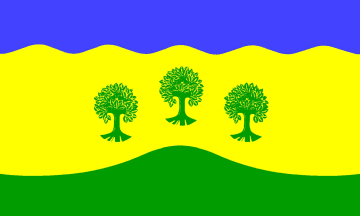
- Flag Coat of arms

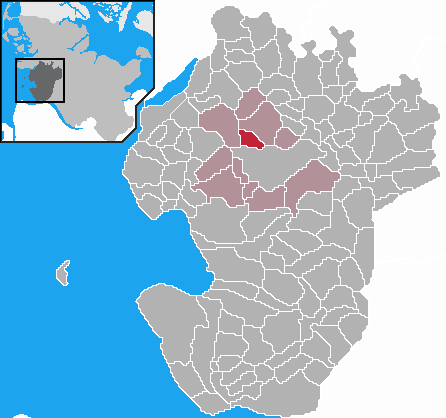
- Location of Wesseln within Dithmarschen district
- Interactive map of Wesseln
- Location within Germany Location within Schleswig-Holstein
- Coordinates: 54°12′N 9°5′E
- Country: Germany
- State: Schleswig-Holstein
- District: Dithmarschen
- Municipal assoc.: Heider Umland

Government
  - Mayor: Konrad Kaeding

Area
  - Total: 3.76 km^{2} (1.45 sq mi)
- Elevation: 11 m (36 ft)

Population (2025-12-31)
  - Total: 1,372
  - Density: 365/km^{2} (945/sq mi)
- Time zone: UTC+01:00 (CET)
  - Summer (DST): UTC+02:00 (CEST)
- Postal codes: 25746
- Dialling codes: 0 48 1
- Vehicle registration: HEI
- Website: www.amt- weddingstedt.de

Wesseln (German pronunciation: [ˈvɛsl̩n]) is a municipality in the district of Dithmarschen, in Schleswig-Holstein, Germany.
