= Ostrohe =

- Municipality
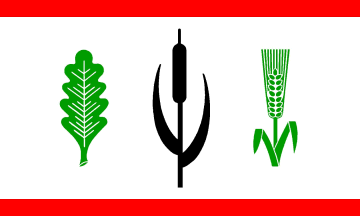
- Flag Coat of arms

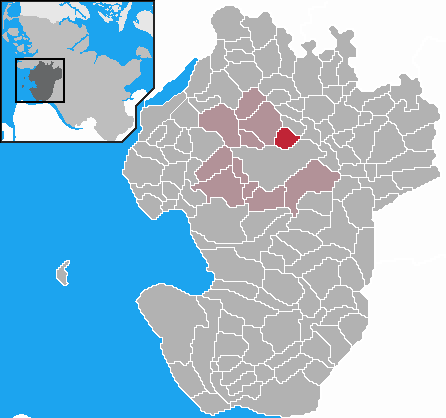
- Location of Ostrohe within Dithmarschen district
- Interactive map of Ostrohe
- Location within Germany Location within Schleswig-Holstein
- Coordinates: 54°13′N 9°9′E
- Country: Germany
- State: Schleswig-Holstein
- District: Dithmarschen
- Municipal assoc.: Heider Umland
- Subdivisions: 3

Government
  - Mayor: Harald Sierks

Area
  - Total: 6.66 km^{2} (2.57 sq mi)
- Elevation: 4 m (13 ft)

Population (2025-12-31)
  - Total: 876
  - Density: 132/km^{2} (341/sq mi)
- Time zone: UTC+01:00 (CET)
  - Summer (DST): UTC+02:00 (CEST)
- Postal codes: 25746
- Dialling codes: 0481
- Vehicle registration: HEI
- Website: amt-heider-umland.de

Ostrohe (German pronunciation: [ˈɔstʁoːə]) is a municipality in the district of Dithmarschen, in Schleswig-Holstein, Germany.
