= Nordhastedt =

- Municipality
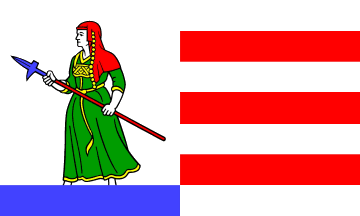
- Flag Coat of arms

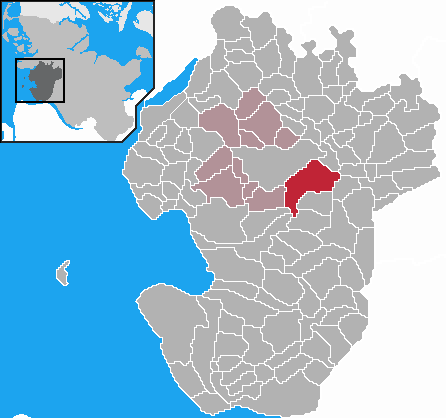
- Location of Nordhastedt within Dithmarschen district
- Interactive map of Nordhastedt
- Location within Germany Location within Schleswig-Holstein
- Coordinates: 54°10′20″N 9°11′03″E
- Country: Germany
- State: Schleswig-Holstein
- District: Dithmarschen
- Municipal assoc.: Heider Umland
- Subdivisions: 3

Government
  - Mayor: Jürgen Hinz (CDU)

Area
  - Total: 26.56 km^{2} (10.25 sq mi)
- Elevation: 11 m (36 ft)

Population (2025-12-31)
  - Total: 2,736
  - Density: 103.0/km^{2} (266.8/sq mi)
- Time zone: UTC+01:00 (CET)
  - Summer (DST): UTC+02:00 (CEST)
- Postal codes: 25785
- Dialling codes: 04804
- Vehicle registration: HEI
- Website: www.amt-heide- land.de

Nordhastedt is a municipality in the district of Dithmarschen, in Schleswig-Holstein, Germany.

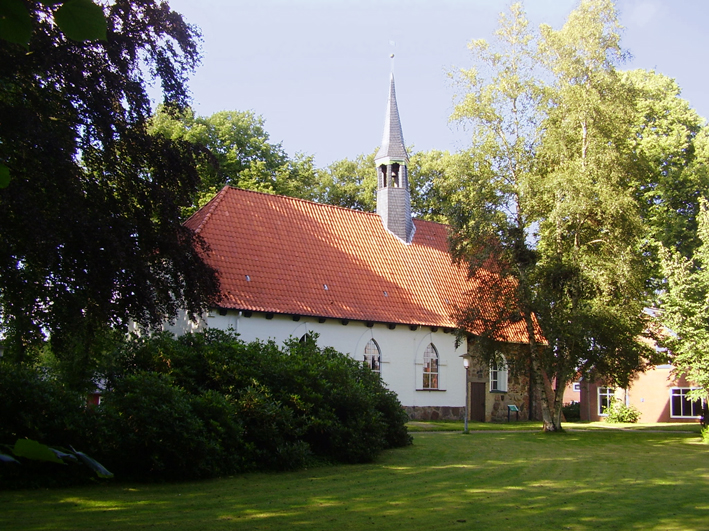
Katharinenkirche

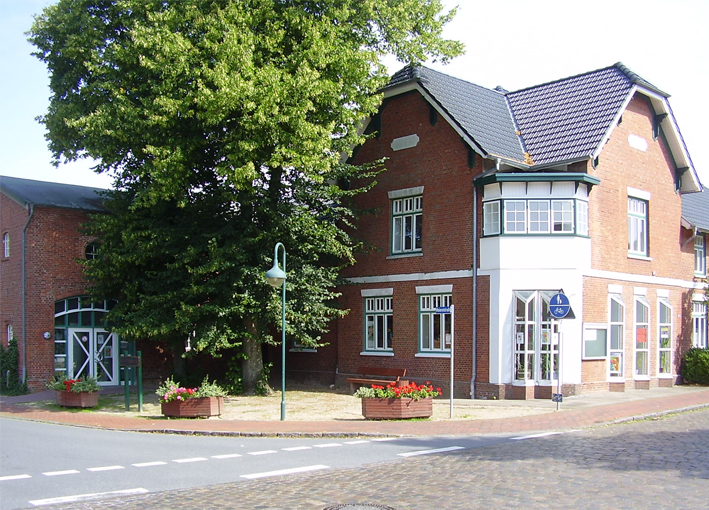
"Ole Schriewerie"

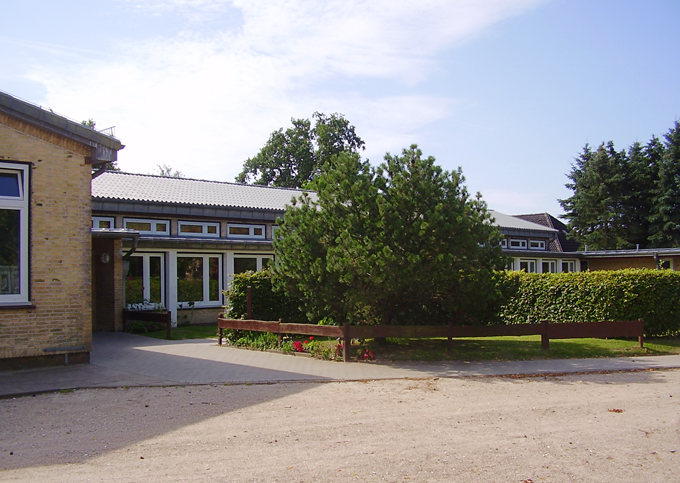
Maria-Jessen-School

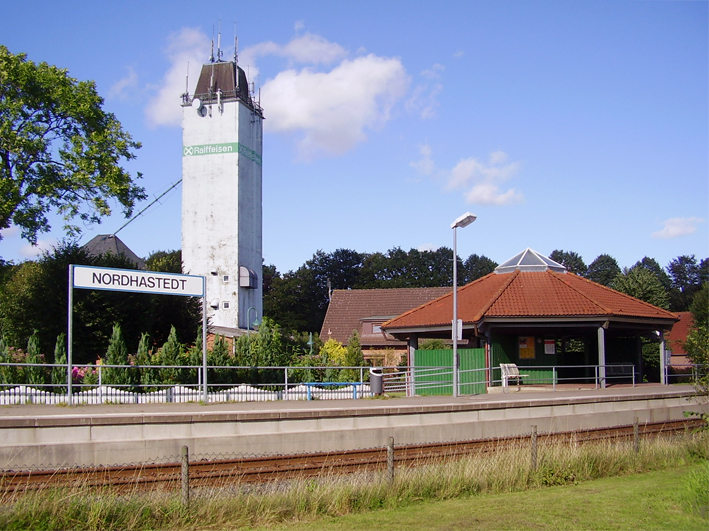
Train station

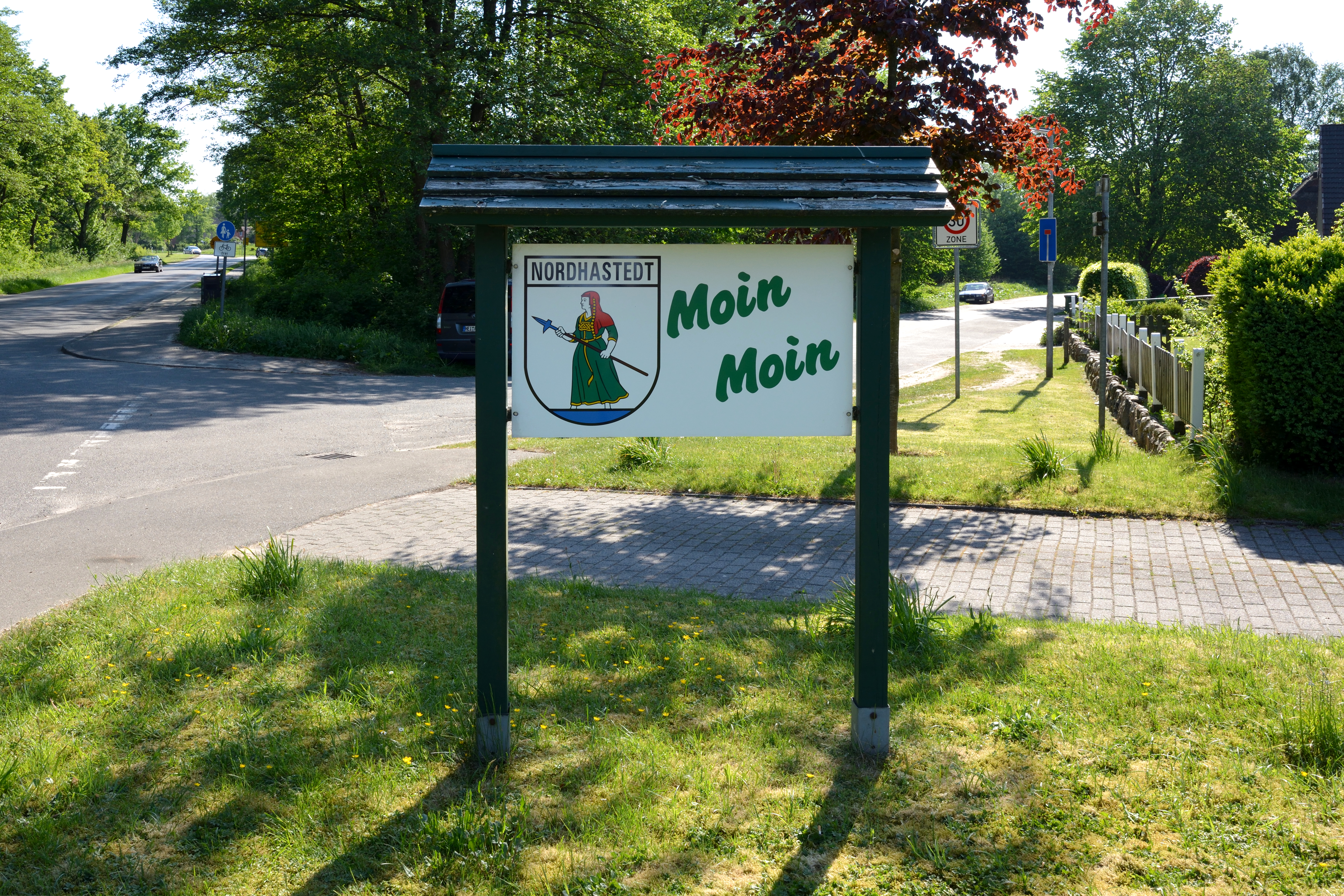
Town entrance sign

== Notable people ==
- Friedrich Wiese (1892-1975) German Wehrmacht general during World War II
