= Neuenkirchen, Schleswig-Holstein =

Neuenkirchen
- Municipality
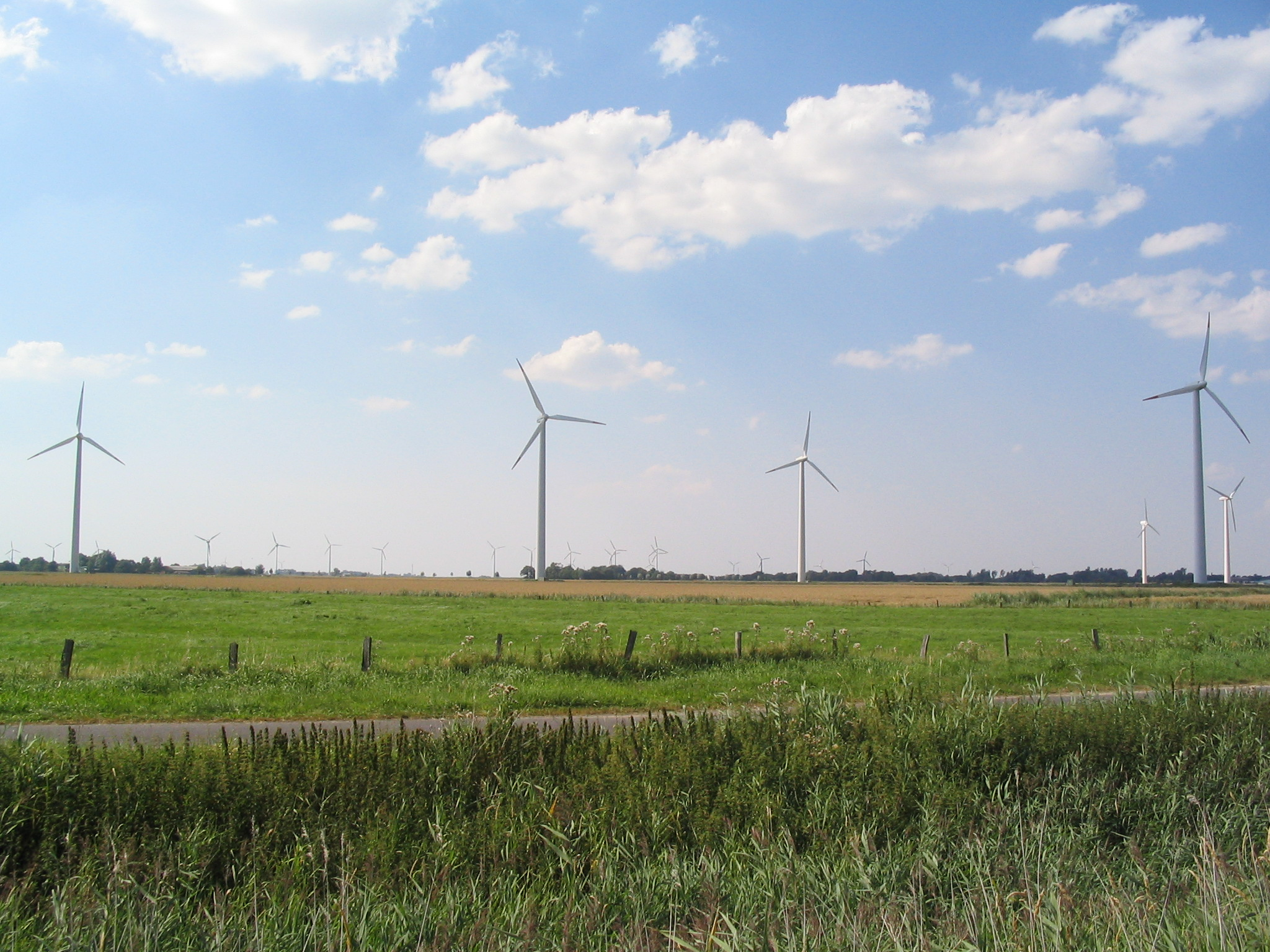
- Wind farm in Neuenkirchen

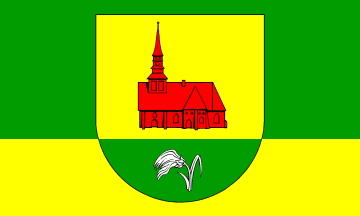
- Flag Coat of arms

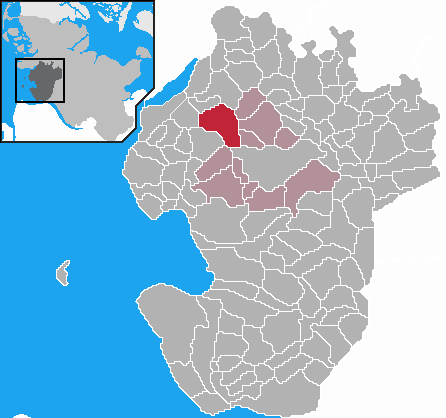
- Location of Neuenkirchen within Dithmarschen district
- Interactive map of Neuenkirchen
- Location within Germany Location within Schleswig-Holstein
- Coordinates: 54°14′N 8°59′E
- Country: Germany
- State: Schleswig-Holstein
- District: Dithmarschen
- Municipal assoc.: Heider Umland
- Subdivisions: 9

Government
  - Mayor: Thies Wellnitz (SPD)

Area
  - Total: 25.14 km^{2} (9.71 sq mi)
- Elevation: 0 m (0 ft)

Population (2025-12-31)
  - Total: 940
  - Density: 37/km^{2} (97/sq mi)
- Time zone: UTC+01:00 (CET)
  - Summer (DST): UTC+02:00 (CEST)
- Postal codes: 25792
- Dialling codes: 04837
- Vehicle registration: IZ

Neuenkirchen (German pronunciation: [ˈnɔʏənˌkɪʁçn̩]) is a municipality in the district of Dithmarschen, in Schleswig-Holstein, Germany.

== Geography ==
Neuenkirchen is situated at approximately 54°14'0" North latitude and 8°59'0" East longitude. The municipality covers an area of about 25.14 square kilometers. As of 2018, it had a population of 999 residents.
