= Stelle-Wittenwurth =

- Municipality
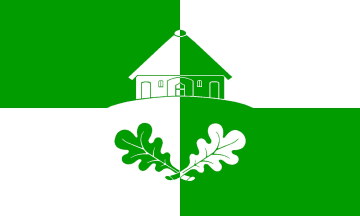
- Flag Coat of arms

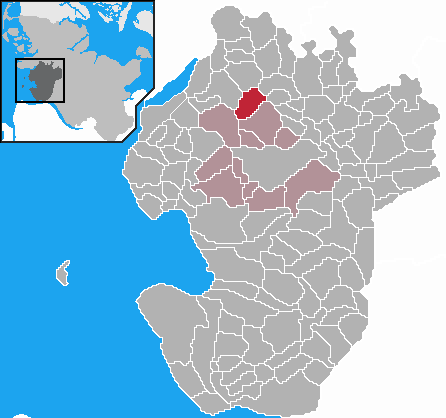
- Location of Stelle-Wittenwurth within Dithmarschen district
- Interactive map of Stelle-Wittenwurth
- Location within Germany Location within Schleswig-Holstein
- Coordinates: 54°16′N 9°3′E
- Country: Germany
- State: Schleswig-Holstein
- District: Dithmarschen
- Municipal assoc.: Heider Umland
- Subdivisions: 2

Government
  - Mayor: Wolfgang Roggow

Area
  - Total: 10.71 km^{2} (4.14 sq mi)
- Elevation: 2 m (6.6 ft)

Population (2025-12-31)
  - Total: 475
  - Density: 44.4/km^{2} (115/sq mi)
- Time zone: UTC+01:00 (CET)
  - Summer (DST): UTC+02:00 (CEST)
- Postal codes: 25795
- Dialling codes: 04837
- Vehicle registration: HEI
- Website: www.amt- heide-land.de

Stelle-Wittenwurth (German pronunciation: [ˈʃtɛlə ˈvɪtn̩vʊʁt]) is a municipality in the district of Dithmarschen, in Schleswig-Holstein, Germany.
