= Hemmingstedt =

- Municipality
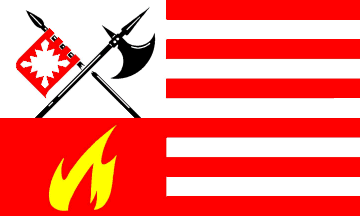
- Flag Coat of arms

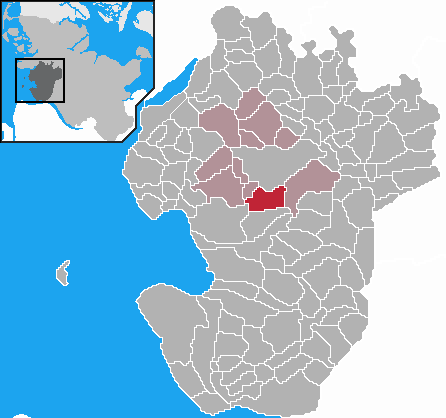
- Location of Hemmingstedt within Dithmarschen district
- Interactive map of Hemmingstedt
- Location within Germany Location within Schleswig-Holstein
- Coordinates: 54°9′N 9°4′E
- Country: Germany
- State: Schleswig-Holstein
- District: Dithmarschen
- Municipal assoc.: Heider Umland
- Subdivisions: 6

Government
  - Mayor: Hartmut Busdorf

Area
  - Total: 16.01 km^{2} (6.18 sq mi)
- Elevation: 10 m (33 ft)

Population (2025-12-31)
  - Total: 2,835
  - Density: 177.1/km^{2} (458.6/sq mi)
- Time zone: UTC+01:00 (CET)
  - Summer (DST): UTC+02:00 (CEST)
- Postal codes: 25770
- Dialling codes: 0481
- Vehicle registration: HEI
- Website: www.amt-heide- land.de

Hemmingstedt (German pronunciation: [ˈhɛmɪŋʃtɛt]) is a German municipality in the district of Dithmarschen in the state of Schleswig-Holstein.

== History ==
Hemmingstedt is the namesake of the Battle of Hemmingstedt, which took place south of the place in today's municipal area of Epenwöhrden. In 1500 the militia of the then Farmers' Republic of Dithmarschen, led by Wulf Isebrand, defeated a grand army of John, king of the Kalmar Union, composed of Jutes, Holsteiners, and Dutch mercenaries.

During the Oil Campaign of World War II, the Deutsche Erdöl-Aktiengesellschaft oil refinery at Hemmingstedt, near Heide, was bombed several times, including attacks using Azon and Operation Aphrodite guided missiles.

The Hemmingstedt refinery boasts the highest structure on the West Coast of Germany. Its chimney is 175 metres high.
