= Lohe-Rickelshof =

- Municipality
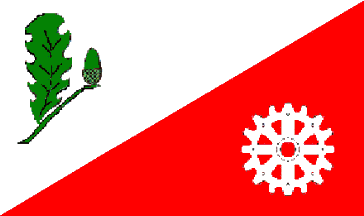
- Flag Coat of arms

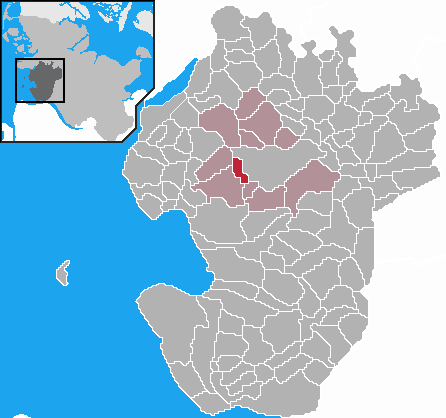
- Location of Lohe-Rickelshof within Dithmarschen district
- Interactive map of Lohe-Rickelshof
- Location within Germany Location within Schleswig-Holstein
- Coordinates: 54°12′N 9°4′E
- Country: Germany
- State: Schleswig-Holstein
- District: Dithmarschen
- Municipal assoc.: Heider Umland
- Subdivisions: 2

Government
  - Mayor: Hans-Georg Klarmann (CDU)

Area
  - Total: 5.39 km^{2} (2.08 sq mi)
- Elevation: 9 m (30 ft)

Population (2025-12-31)
  - Total: 2,003
  - Density: 372/km^{2} (962/sq mi)
- Time zone: UTC+01:00 (CET)
  - Summer (DST): UTC+02:00 (CEST)
- Postal codes: 25746
- Dialling codes: 0481
- Vehicle registration: HEI
- Website: www.amt-heide- land.de

Lohe-Rickelshof (German pronunciation: [ˈloːə ˈʁɪkl̩shoːf]) is a municipality in the district of Dithmarschen, in Schleswig-Holstein, Germany.

== Notable residents ==
- Hans Bothmann (1911–1946), German Nazi SS concentration camp commandant
