= Weddingstedt =

- Municipality
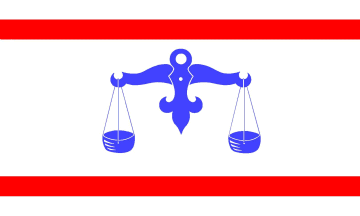
- Flag Coat of arms

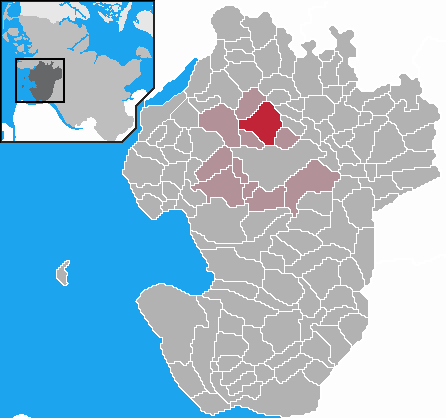
- Location of Weddingstedt within Dithmarschen district
- Interactive map of Weddingstedt
- Location within Germany Location within Schleswig-Holstein
- Coordinates: 54°14′N 9°6′E
- Country: Germany
- State: Schleswig-Holstein
- District: Dithmarschen
- Municipal assoc.: Heider Umland

Government
  - Mayor: Edgar Lehmann (CDU)

Area
  - Total: 17.89 km^{2} (6.91 sq mi)
- Elevation: 10 m (33 ft)

Population (2025-12-31)
  - Total: 2,334
  - Density: 130.5/km^{2} (337.9/sq mi)
- Time zone: UTC+01:00 (CET)
  - Summer (DST): UTC+02:00 (CEST)
- Postal codes: 25795
- Dialling codes: 0481
- Vehicle registration: HEI
- Website: www.amt-weddingstedt.de

Weddingstedt (German pronunciation: [ˈvɛdɪŋʃtɛt]) is a municipality in the district of Dithmarschen, in Schleswig-Holstein, Germany. It is situated approximately 5 km north of Heide.

Weddingstedt is part of the Amt Kirchspielslandgemeinde ("collective municipality") Heider Umland.
