= Zille (boat) =

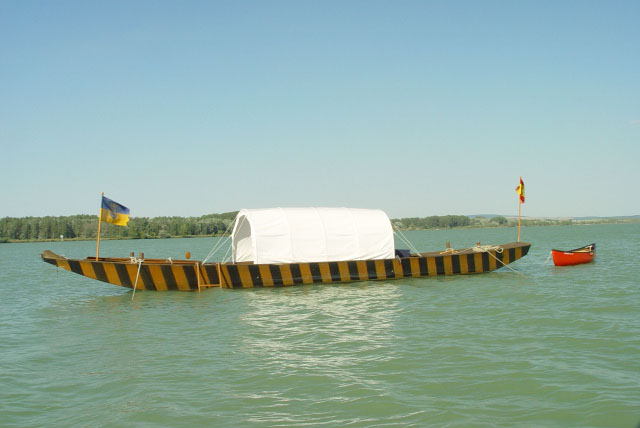
Zille used for fishing, 1982, 10 meters in length

The term Zille (plural Zillen) is used for a family of flat-bottomed vessels which are used in the Danube River regions of Germany and Austria.

== Description ==
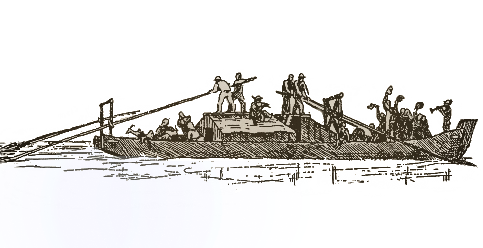
Historical reconstruction of an Ulmer Schachtel ("Ulm Box"). This is a nickname for the Wiener Zille (Viennese Zille), which was used for one-way trips downriver.

Zillen are simply constructed boats, between five and 30 meters long. Smaller Zillen are generally open, while larger Zillen for freight or passenger transport have house-like structures amidships. Zillen have a flat floor and straight side walls. The front of the boat usually tapers. Depending on the type, the tail of the Zille may be either narrow or wide. For the past several decades, the tail has been used a mount point for motorized operation.

The Zille has a very shallow draft and is relatively stable and secure against tipping. Zillen can be driven by a motor or rowed. Historically, Zillen carrying freight were also towed or propelled by sails.

The length of today's Zillen rarely exceeds 10 meters, but in the 19th century Zillen used for freight were often more than 30 meters long. Included in the Zillen family are slim boats with a pointed bow and stern as well as small "Schugge" with wide ends and a "Stock Zillen" with a similar design to other Zillen in front and a wide rear bulkhead that opens and closes for loading and unloading. Boats with a wider aft area are also called "Plätte"; they fall under the general classification of "Zillen".

== History ==
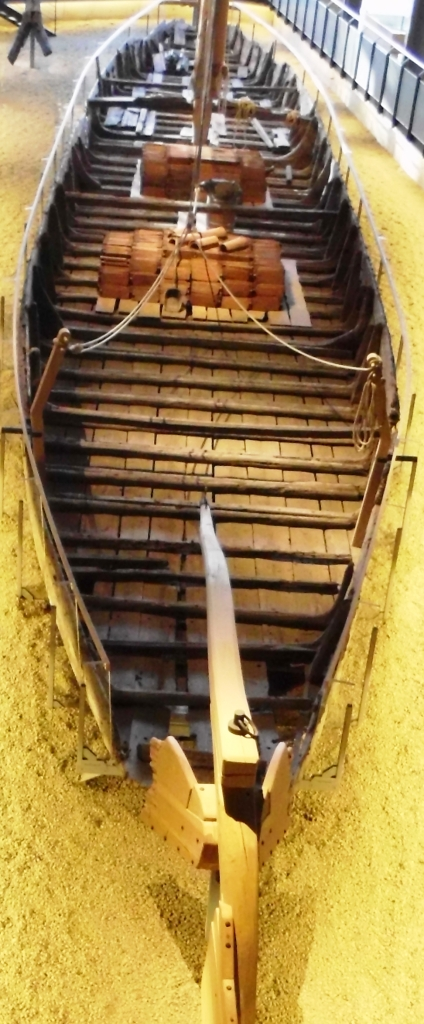
A Bohemian Zille, sunk in about 1850, shown with a cargo of bricks. German Museum of Technology, Berlin.

Early Zillen were a maximum of 22 meters long and 3 meters wide, but their dimensions increased with time. In the late 19th century they reached sizes of up to 30 meters in length and 7.5 meters wide. The hulls of these boats had a height of about 1.5 meters. Centered on the ship there was a large wooden hut.

Zillen were used in many areas of the Danube.

== Modern usage and construction ==
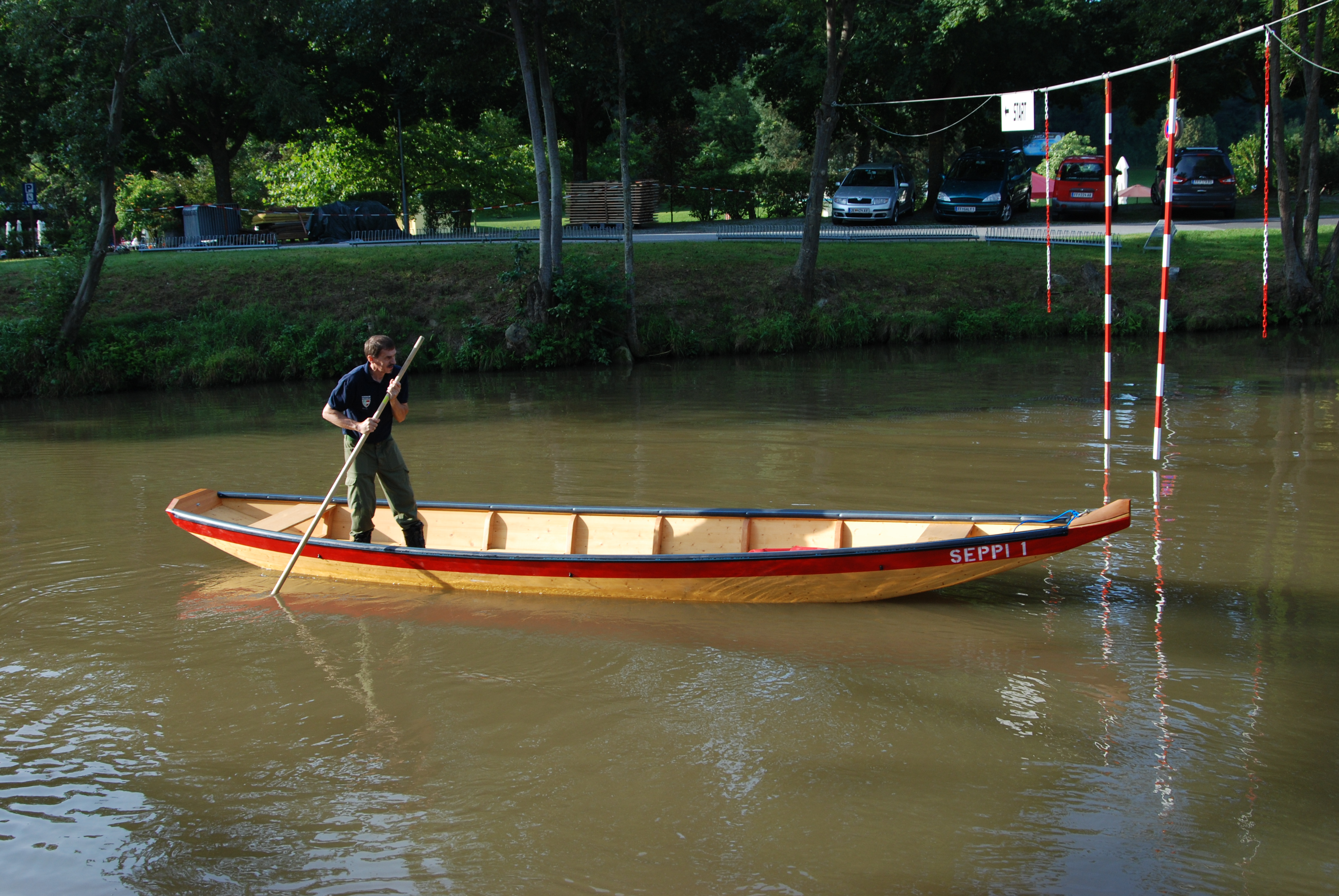
Fire brigade Zille

The Zille is still used today as a working, fishing and recreational boat. As in earlier times, they are built from soft wood, mainly larch and spruce. Production facilities for Zillen are mainly in the Upper Austrian Danube in the Engelhartszell area. On the northern bank of the Danube there are two family businesses that have been building Zillen for several centuries. The sizes produced in these facilities are typically around 4 to 12 meters in length, but they are capable of producing much larger Zillen on order. The shipbuilders offer some fixed Zillen types, such as a Zille for firefighters, in standardized dimensions. All other Zillen are tailored individually and for the respective application. This flexibility is still the strength of this boat type. Due to the simple design rules compared to contemporary designs, Zillen manufacturing has a very favorable price-performance ratio. The proverbial robustness of Zillen offers good reason for the continued existence and use of this traditional watercraft.

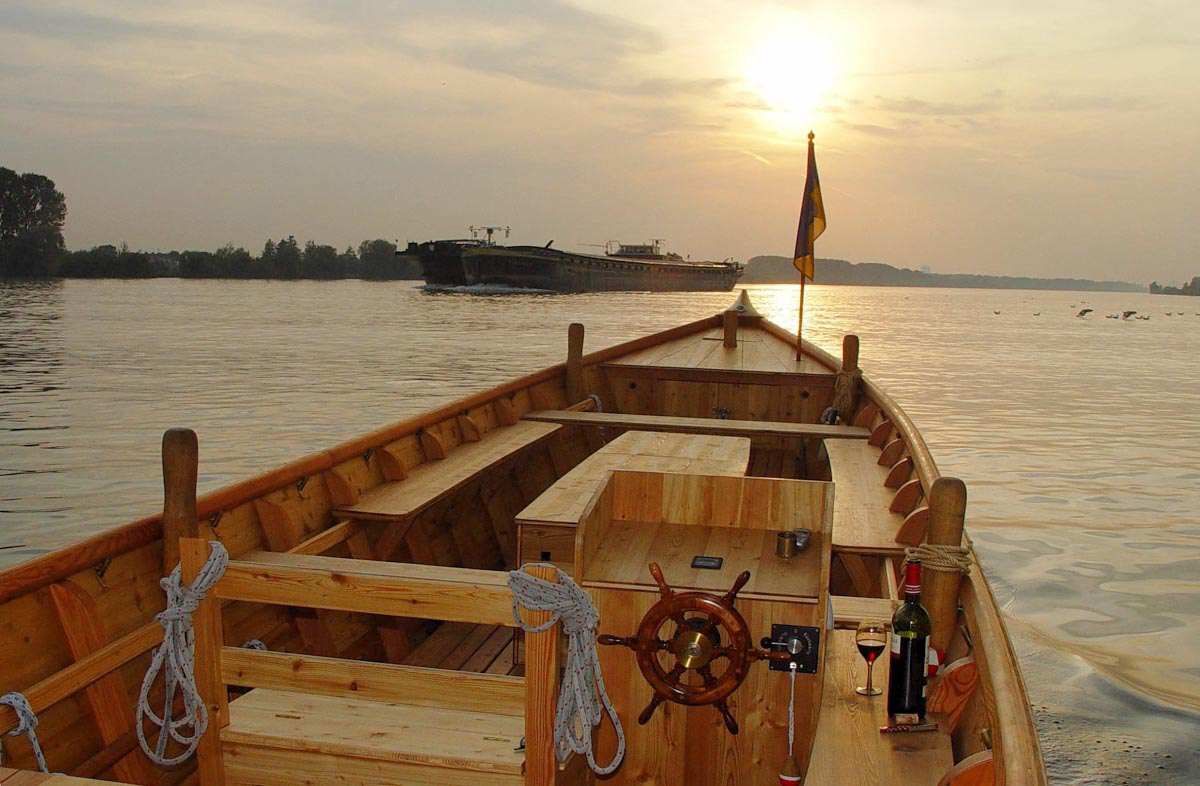
A modern Zille

Annual Zillen championships are held in regional centers.

The uses of Zillen are as diverse as their design: Zillen were and are used for fishing, as workboats in hydraulic engineering, as operational and rescue vehicles, as ferries, and for fire fighting. They are traditionally used for transport of both goods and passengers. Zillen are used as transport vehicles in gravel and sand extraction.
