= Wöhrden =

- Municipality
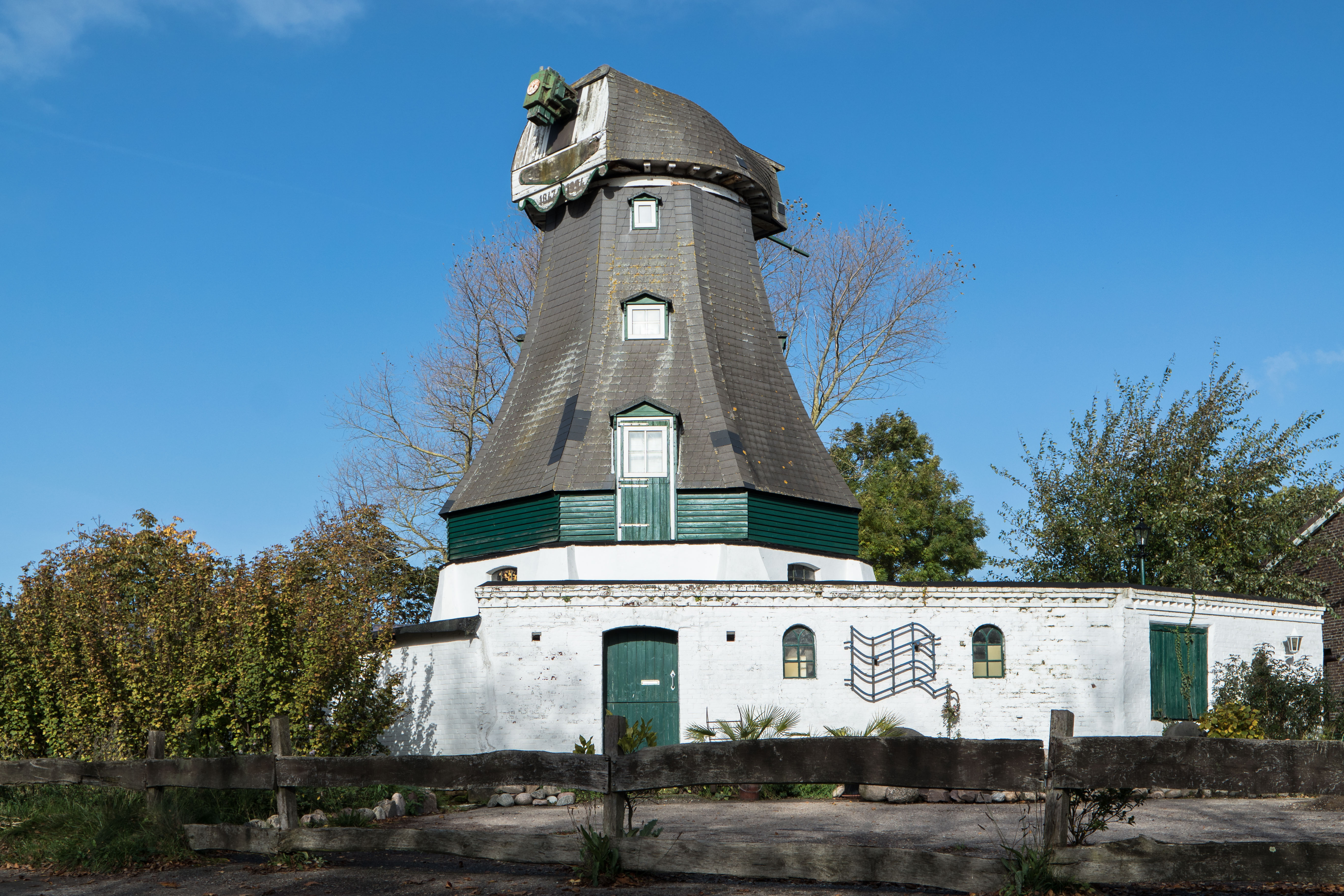

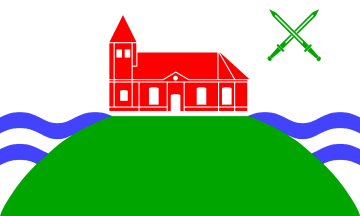
- Flag Coat of arms

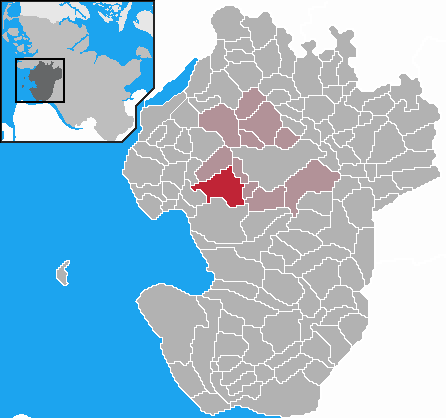
- Location of Wöhrden within Dithmarschen district
- Interactive map of Wöhrden
- Location within Germany Location within Schleswig-Holstein
- Coordinates: 54°10′N 9°0′E
- Country: Germany
- State: Schleswig-Holstein
- District: Dithmarschen
- Municipal assoc.: Heider Umland

Government
  - Mayor: Peter Schoof (CDU)

Area
  - Total: 21.77 km^{2} (8.41 sq mi)
- Elevation: 4 m (13 ft)

Population (2025-12-31)
  - Total: 1,200
  - Density: 55/km^{2} (140/sq mi)
- Time zone: UTC+01:00 (CET)
  - Summer (DST): UTC+02:00 (CEST)
- Postal codes: 25797
- Dialling codes: 04839
- Vehicle registration: HEI
- Website: www.amt-heide- land.de

Wöhrden (German pronunciation: [ˈvøːɐ̯dn̩]) is a municipality in the district of Dithmarschen, in Schleswig-Holstein, Germany. Heinrich Scheidemann, one of the greatest organ composers of the early Baroque, disciple of Jan Pieterszoon Sweelinck and forerunner to J. S. Bach, was born in Wöhrden, in 1595.
