= Norderwöhrden =

- Municipality
- Coat of arms

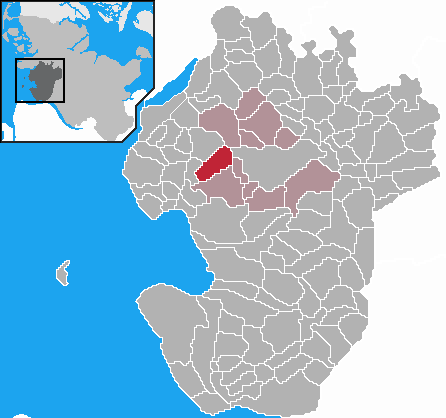
- Location of Norderwöhrden within Dithmarschen district
- Interactive map of Norderwöhrden
- Location within Germany Location within Schleswig-Holstein
- Coordinates: 54°11′39″N 9°0′6″E
- Country: Germany
- State: Schleswig-Holstein
- District: Dithmarschen
- Municipal assoc.: Heider Umland

Government
  - Mayor: Kay Uwe Evers

Area
  - Total: 18.47 km^{2} (7.13 sq mi)
- Elevation: 3 m (9.8 ft)

Population (2025-12-31)
  - Total: 254
  - Density: 13.8/km^{2} (35.6/sq mi)
- Time zone: UTC+01:00 (CET)
  - Summer (DST): UTC+02:00 (CEST)
- Postal codes: 25746
- Dialling codes: 0481, 04833, 04839
- Vehicle registration: HEI
- Website: www.amt-heide- land.de

Norderwöhrden is a municipality in the district of Dithmarschen, in Schleswig-Holstein, Germany.
