= Hennstedt (Amt Kirchspielslandgemeinde) =

Coordinates: 54°16′N 9°10′E

- Former amt
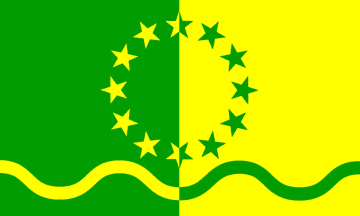
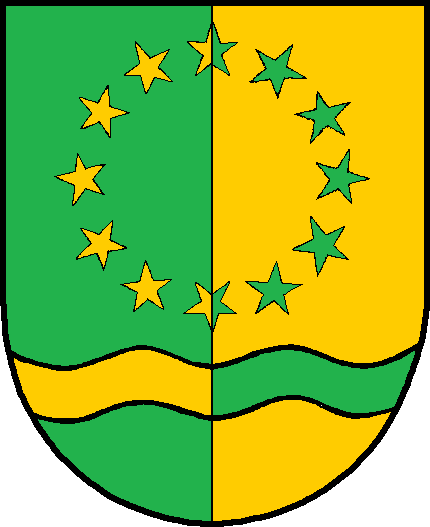
- Flag Coat of arms

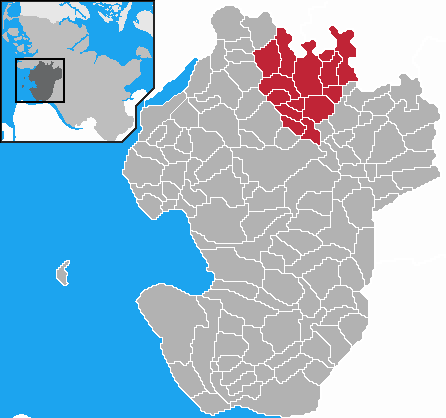
- Map of Dithmarschen highlighting Hennstedt
- Country: Germany
- State: Schleswig-Holstein
- District: Dithmarschen
- Disestablished: 2008-01-01
- Region seat: Hennstedt

Area
  - Total: 125 km^{2} (48 sq mi)

Kirchspielslandgemeinde Hennstedt was an Amt ("collective municipality") in the district Dithmarschen in Schleswig-Holstein, in northern Germany. Its administration was in the village Hennstedt. In January 2008, it was merged with the Ämter Kirchspielslandgemeinde Lunden and Kirchspielslandgemeinde Tellingstedt to form the Amt Kirchspielslandgemeinden Eider.

It consisted of the following municipalities (with population in 2005):

1. Barkenholm (189)
2. Bergewöhrden (36)
3. Delve (737)
4. Fedderingen (277)
5. Glüsing (119)
6. Hägen (54)
7. Hennstedt (1,880)
8. Hollingstedt (338)
9. Kleve (452)
10. Linden (876)
11. Norderheistedt (144)
12. Schlichting (239)
13. Süderheistedt (542)
14. Wiemerstedt (165)
