= Tellingstedt (Amt Kirchspielslandgemeinde) =

Coordinates: 54.217°N 9.283°E

- Former amt
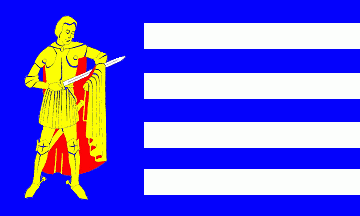
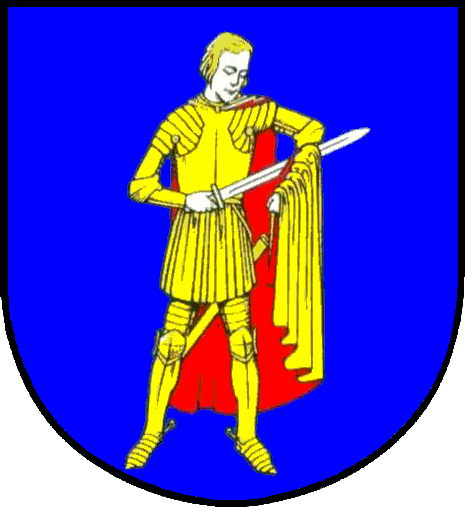
- Flag Coat of arms

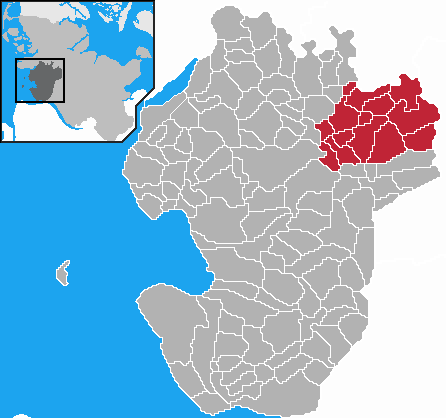
- Map of Dithmarschen highlighting Tellingstedt
- Country: Germany
- State: Schleswig-Holstein
- District: Dithmarschen
- Disestablished: 1 January 2008
- Region seat: Tellingstedt

Area
  - Total: 140 km^{2} (54 sq mi)

Kirchspielslandgemeinde Tellingstedt was an Amt ("collective municipality") in the district of Dithmarschen, in Schleswig-Holstein, Germany. Its seat was in Tellingstedt. In January 2008, it was merged with the Ämter Kirchspielslandgemeinde Hennstedt and Kirchspielslandgemeinde Lunden to form the Amt Kirchspielslandgemeinden Eider.

The Amt Kirchspielslandgemeinde Tellingstedt consisted of the following municipalities (with population in 2005):

1. Dellstedt (801)
2. Dörpling (611)
3. Gaushorn (213)
4. Hövede (64)
5. Pahlen (1.168)
6. Schalkholz (595)
7. Süderdorf (396)
8. Tellingstedt (2.493)
9. Tielenhemme (178)
10. Wallen (37)
11. Welmbüttel (465)
12. Westerborstel (98)
13. Wrohm (732)
