= Lunden (Amt Kirchspielslandgemeinde) =

Coordinates: 54.333°N 9.017°E

- Former amt
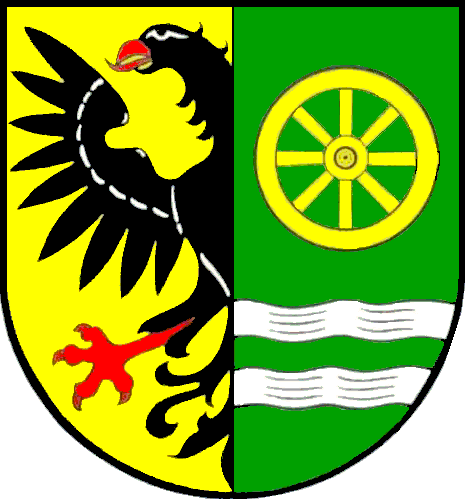
- Coat of arms

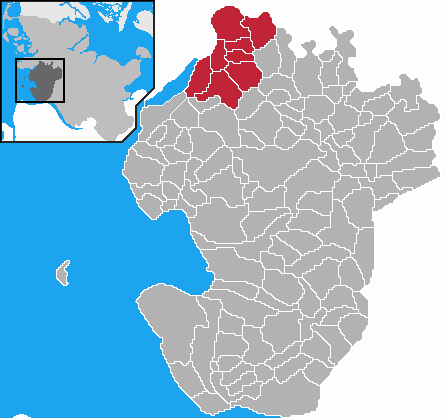
- Map of Dithmarschen highlighting Lunden
- Country: Germany
- State: Schleswig-Holstein
- District: Dithmarschen
- Disestablished: 1 January 2008
- Region seat: Lunden

Area
  - Total: 100 km^{2} (39 sq mi)

Kirchspielslandgemeinde Lunden was an Amt ("collective municipality") in the district of Dithmarschen, in Schleswig-Holstein, Germany. Its seat was in Lunden. In January 2008, it was merged with the Ämter Kirchspielslandgemeinde Hennstedt and Kirchspielslandgemeinde Tellingstedt to form the Amt Kirchspielslandgemeinden Eider.

The Amt Kirchspielslandgemeinde Lunden consisted of the following municipalities (with population in 2005):

1. Groven (128)
2. Hemme (514)
3. Karolinenkoog (132)
4. Krempel (663)
5. Lehe (1.160)
6. Lunden (1.655)
7. Rehm-Flehde-Bargen (609)
8. Sankt Annen (355)
