= Pahlen, Germany =

Pahlen
- Municipality
- Coat of arms
- Interactive map of Pahlen
- Location within Germany Location within Schleswig-Holstein
- Coordinates: 54°16′N 9°17′E
- Country: Germany
- State: Schleswig-Holstein
- District: Dithmarschen
- Municipal assoc.: Eider

Government
  - Mayor: Marten Voß

Area
  - Total: 10.8 km^{2} (4.2 sq mi)
- Elevation: 12 m (39 ft)

Population (2025-12-31)
  - Total: 1,160
  - Density: 107/km^{2} (278/sq mi)
- Time zone: UTC+01:00 (CET)
  - Summer (DST): UTC+02:00 (CEST)
- Postal codes: 25794
- Dialling codes: 04803
- Vehicle registration: HEI, MED
- Website: www.gemeinde-pahlen.de

Pahlen (German pronunciation: [ˈpaːlən], Low German pronunciation: [ˈpɑːlən]) is a municipality in the district of Dithmarschen, Schleswig-Holstein, located in northern Germany. It is situated along the river Eider within the Heide-Itzehoe Geest natural area. The village, which has been an important settlement for centuries, had population of 1,153 as of December 2022.

The coat of arms of Pahlen features three golden floating rounded stakes, symbolizing the name derived from Pfahl (stake). A lapwing and a silver boat are also depicted, with a wavy silver line dividing the symbols, representing the Eider River.

== Geography ==
=== Location ===
Pahlen lies in the northern part of the Heide-Itzehoe Geest natural area, stretching along the Eider River. The village's northern boundary runs parallel to the river, contributing to its accessibility for water-based activities.

=== Subdivisions ===
The municipality includes the central village of Pahlen, which also serves as the church village. Additionally, Pahlen encompasses the settlements of Pahlhude and Klumpen.

=== Neighboring municipalities ===
Pahlen shares borders with the municipalities of:

- Wallen
- Erfde (Schleswig-Flensburg District)
- Tielen (Schleswig-Flensburg District)
- Tielenhemme
- Schalkholz
- Hövede
- Dörpling

== History ==
Pahlen's history dates back to the Middle Ages when it was considered for the role of a bishop's seat. In 1065, Adam of Bremen referenced the village under the name "Palmis" in his *Gesta Hammaburgensis ecclesiae pontificum*, indicating its ecclesiastical significance at the time. The village's name is thought to be derived from the word *Pfahl* (stake), with hypotheses suggesting that early structures in the region may have been built on stilts or stakes due to the area's swampy nature.

During the Middle Ages and up until the 19th century, Pahlen was a small agricultural village. The discovery of clay deposits in the early 20th century transformed the area into an industrial hub with brickworks and cement factories, including in the Pahlhude area, which became an important harbor. It was once the most important harbor on the Schleswig-Holstein west coast between 1840 and 1910, located on the old Eider Canal, the predecessor of the Kiel Canal.

In the 1930s, the village saw significant industrial decline, largely due to the aftermath of the First World War and the construction of the Kiel Canal, which led to fewer people using the Eider Canal. As a result, the establishment of Pahlhude as an independent community faded. Today, Pahlen remains a primarily residential area, with a few agricultural businesses and a growing tourism industry. The name Pahlen has several historical interpretations, including connections to both stakes used for defense and to the surrounding wetland areas.

=== Pahlhude ===
Pahlhude, once a key part of Pahlen, had 960 residents in 1925. It featured a district railway station with a two-stall locomotive shed, water tower, and loading tracks, which were vital for transporting goods, particularly from the cement factories and harbor. The railway line connecting Heide to the harbor at Pahlhude was essential for boosting regional trade, including the exchange of grain between trains and ships.

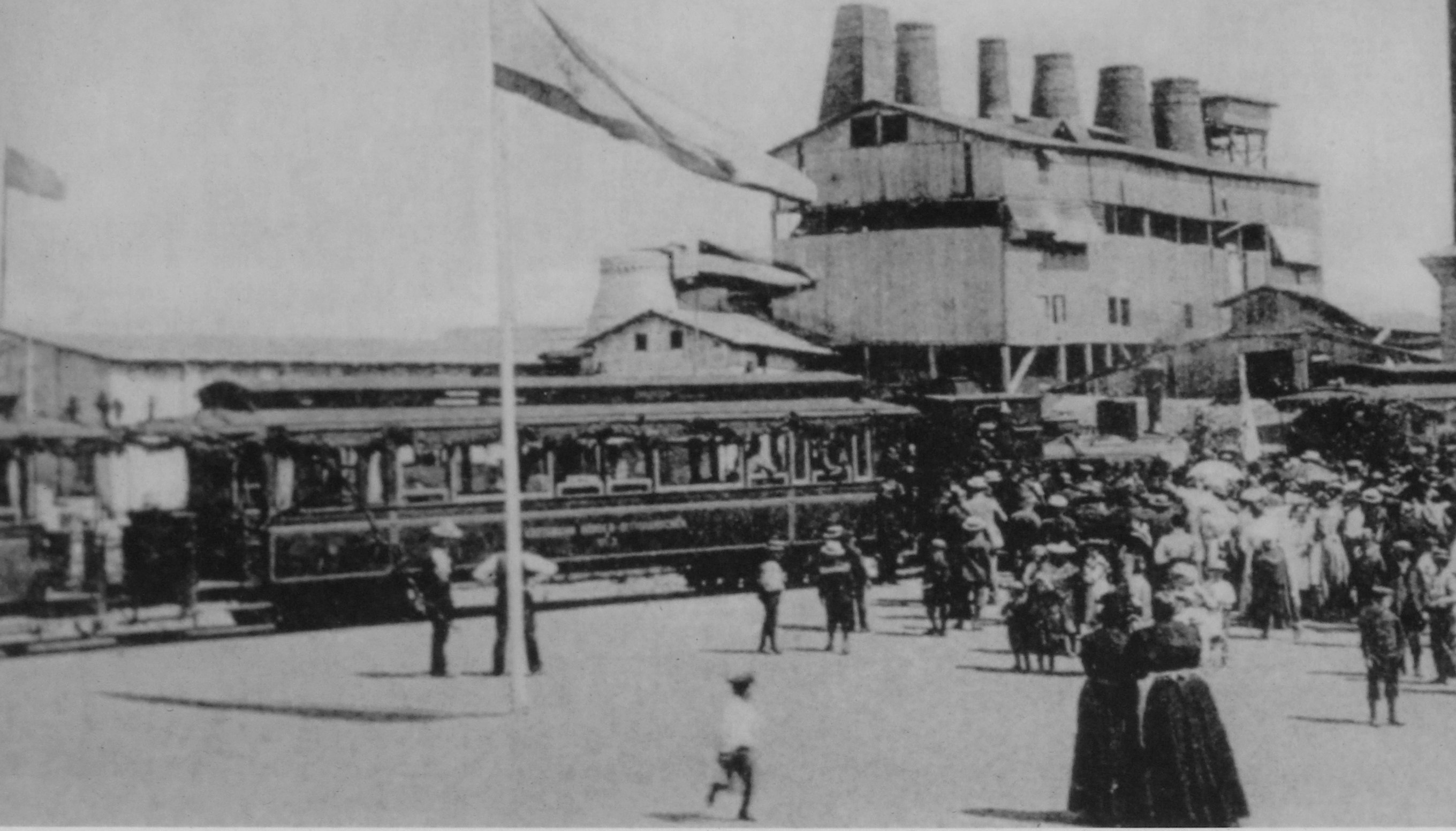
Opening run of the narrow-gauge railway at the Pahlhude Harbor in 1905

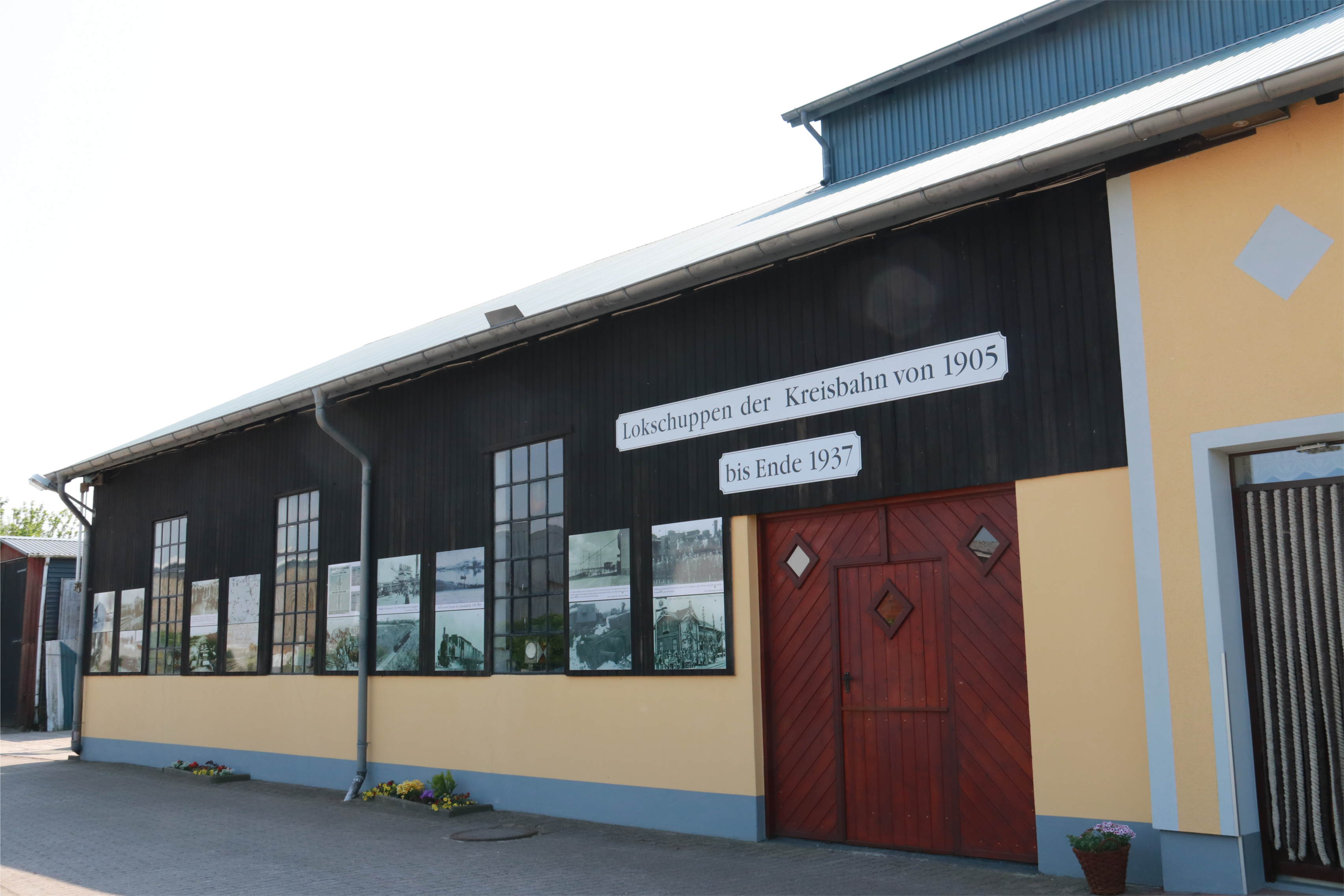
The railway station today

By the late 1920s, the station's role began to decline as the cement factories closed, leading to reduced industrial activity. Despite this, the railway had a lasting impact on the region, improving access to the remote eastern municipalities. Today, Pahlhude's industrial legacy serves as a reminder of the village's central role in the area's economy during its peak years.

== Politics ==
=== Municipal Council ===
The municipality is governed by a municipal council, which holds elections every five years. In the most recent election held on May 14, 2023, voter turnout was 62.0%. The CDU secured six of the 11 council seats, while the Pahlen Voters' Association (WGP) won five.

Municipal election on May 14, 2023

Voter turnout: 62.0 percent

Party	Percentage
CDU	52.6
WGP	47.4

== Culture and landmarks ==
Pahlen is home to several cultural monuments, several of which are registered as cultural heritage sites by the state of Schleswig-Holstein. The Tielenburg, a medieval fortification, is one such landmark.

== Economy and infrastructure ==
=== Economic structure ===
The economy of Pahlen is largely based on agriculture, particularly dairy farming. The village also benefits from its proximity to the Eider River, which supports local boating activities. The two sports boat harbors, Westhafen and Pahlen Sportboothafen, are destinations for water sports enthusiasts.

In recent years, tourism has been a growing sector due to Pahlen's natural setting and opportunities for outdoor activities like cycling and canoeing along the Eider-Treene-Sorge cycling route.

=== Transport links ===
Pahlen is connected to neighboring towns and regions through the Schleswig-Holstein State Road 172. The village is accessible to nearby towns such as Heide, Husum, and Rendsburg. The Eider River is crossed by the Pahlen drawbridge, which serves as a critical infrastructure link for the area.

== Notable people ==
- **Hans Grohs** (1892–1981): A painter and deputy director of the Nordic Art Academy in Bremen, born in Pahlen.

== Literature ==
- Heinz-Herbert Schöning (1980), Die Kleinbahn des Kreises Norderdithmarschen, Heide: Westholsteinische Verlagsanstalt, ISBN 3-8042-0231-4
- Gemeinde Pahlen (2000), Chronik der Gemeinde Pahlen, Gemeinde Pahlen Selbstverlag
