= Hennstedt =

Hennstedt may refer to:

- Hennstedt, Dithmarschen, a municipality in the district of Dithmarschen, Schleswig-Holstein, Germany
- Hennstedt, Steinburg, a municipality in the district of Steinburg, Schleswig-Holstein, Germany
- Hennstedt (Amt Kirchspielslandgemeinde), a former country subdivision in the district of Dithmarschen, Schleswig-Holstein, Germany
