= Lehe =

Lehe may refer to the following places in Germany:

- Lehe, Lower Saxony, a municipality in the district of Emsland, Lower Saxony
- Lehe, Schleswig-Holstein, a municipality in the district of Dithmarschen, Schleswig-Holstein
- Lehe, Bremerhaven, part of the city of Bremerhaven, Bremen
