= Glüsing =

- Municipality
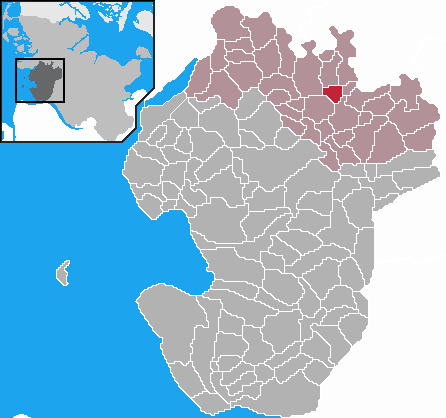
- Location of Glüsing within Dithmarschen district
- Interactive map of Glüsing
- Location within Germany Location within Schleswig-Holstein
- Coordinates: 54°16′24″N 9°13′14″E
- Country: Germany
- State: Schleswig-Holstein
- District: Dithmarschen
- Municipal assoc.: Eider

Government
  - Mayor: Ursula Rink

Area
  - Total: 4.69 km^{2} (1.81 sq mi)
- Elevation: 4 m (13 ft)

Population (2025-12-31)
  - Total: 113
  - Density: 24.1/km^{2} (62.4/sq mi)
- Time zone: UTC+01:00 (CET)
  - Summer (DST): UTC+02:00 (CEST)
- Postal codes: 25779
- Dialling codes: 04836
- Vehicle registration: HEI
- Website: www.amt-eider.de

Glüsing is a municipality in the district of Dithmarschen, in Schleswig-Holstein, Germany. On 1 April 1934, the municipality was formed due to the disbandment of the Amt Kirchspielslandgemeinde Tellingstedt which at the time, had around 85 inhabitants.
