= Eider (Amt) =

- Amt
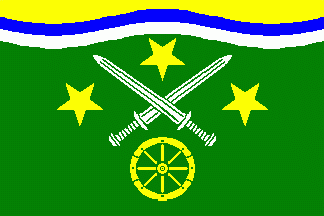
- Flag Coat of arms

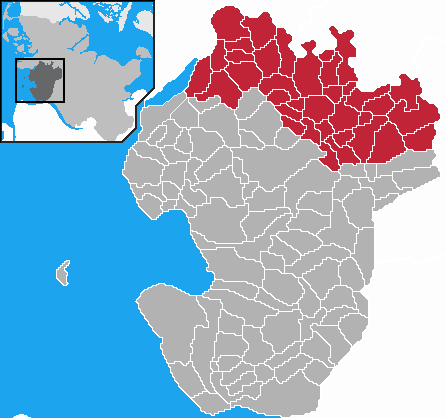
- Map of Dithmarschen highlighting Eider
- Interactive map of Eider
- Location within Germany Location within Schleswig-Holstein
- Coordinates: 54°16′N 9°10′E
- Country: Germany
- State: Schleswig-Holstein
- District: Dithmarschen
- Founded: 2008
- Seat: Hennstedt
- Subdivisions: 34 municipalities

Government
  - Mayor: Manfred Lindemann (CDU)

Area
  - Total: 361.37 km^{2} (139.53 sq mi)

Population (2025-12-31)
  - Total: 19,019
  - Density: 52.630/km^{2} (136.31/sq mi)
- Time zone: UTC+01:00 (CET)
  - Summer (DST): UTC+02:00 (CEST)
- Website: amt-eider.de

Kirchspielslandgemeinden Eider (also Eider or KLG Eider) is an Amt ("collective municipality") in the district of Dithmarschen, in Schleswig-Holstein, Germany. Its seat is in Hennstedt. It was formed on 1 January 2008 from the former Ämter Kirchspielslandgemeinde Hennstedt, Kirchspielslandgemeinde Lunden and Kirchspielslandgemeinde Tellingstedt. The Amt is named after the river Eider.

The Amt Kirchspielslandgemeinden Eider consists of the following municipalities:

1. Barkenholm
2. Bergewöhrden
3. Dellstedt
4. Delve
5. Dörpling
6. Fedderingen
7. Gaushorn
8. Glüsing
9. Groven
10. Hemme
11. Hennstedt
12. Hollingstedt
13. Hövede
14. Karolinenkoog
15. Kleve
16. Krempel
17. Lehe
18. Linden
19. Lunden
20. Norderheistedt
21. Pahlen
22. Rehm-Flehde-Bargen
23. Sankt Annen
24. Schalkholz
25. Schlichting
26. Süderdorf
27. Süderheistedt
28. Tellingstedt
29. Tielenhemme
30. Wallen
31. Welmbüttel
32. Westerborstel
33. Wiemerstedt
34. Wrohm
