= Wilhelm Wieben =

German journalist, actor, and author (1935–2019)

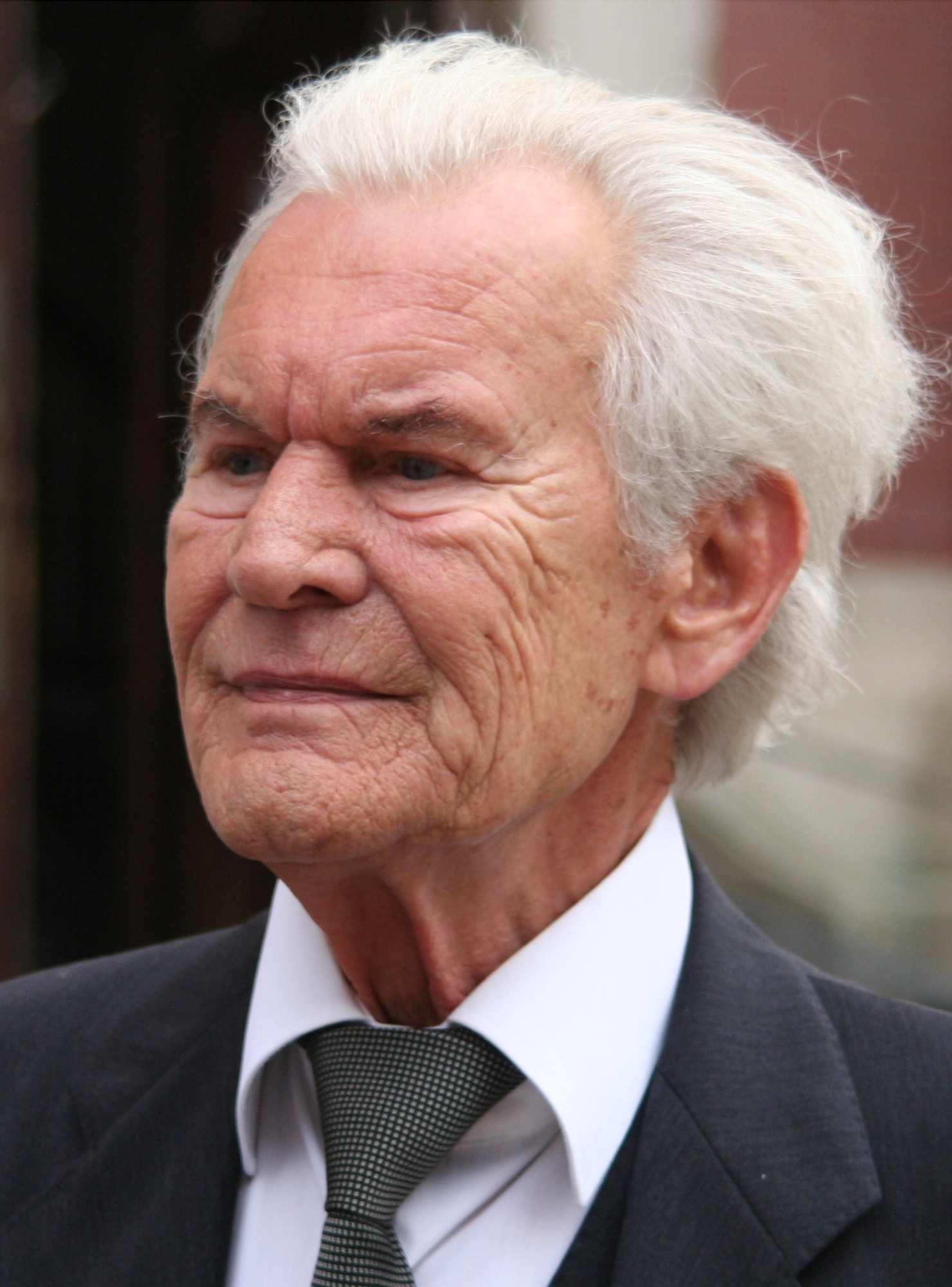
- Born: 2 June 1935; Hennstedt, Dithmarschen, Germany
- Died: 13 June 2019 (aged 84); Hamburg, Germany
- Occupations: Television journalist, actor, author

Wilhelm Wieben (2 June 1935 – 13 June 2019) was a German journalist, actor and author, best known for presenting the daily news in Tagesschau, the most-watched news program on German television, from 1973 to 1998.

== Biography ==
Wieben was born in Hennstedt, Dithmarschen. After school he studied theater at Max-Reinhardt-Schule für Schauspiel in Berlin. Later he worked as a journalist for Radio Bremen and was a news presenter on the TV channel ARD in Tagesschau between 1973 and his retirement in 1998. Wieben has authored books in Low German, a regional language in Northern Germany. He is also heard (and briefly seen in the music video) in Falco's controversial hit song Jeanny: The part of the Newsflash in the track is spoken by Wieben.

Inge Meysel outed Wieben as a homosexual in a 1995 interview in the magazine Stern. Before publication, Stern asked for Wieben's permission to publish the interview which he granted.

== Works by author, in German ==
- Wenn't Abend ward. Heide : Boyens, 1999
- Melodie der Meere. Hamburg : Kabel, 1997
- Mien plattdüütsch Wiehnachtsbook. Heide in Holstein : Boyens, 1993
- Mien plattdüütsch Leesbook. Heide in Holstein : Boyens, 1986
