= Hägen =

- Ortsteil of Süderheistedt
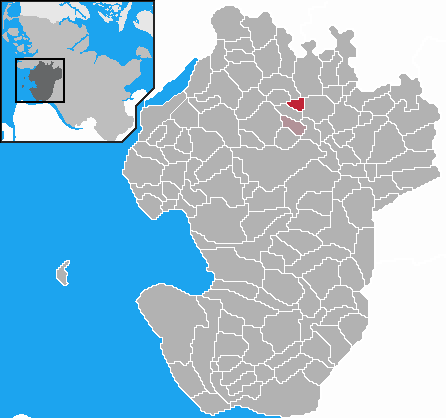
- Location of Hägen within the Dithmarschen district
- Interactive map of Hägen
- Location within Germany Location within Schleswig-Holstein
- Coordinates: 54°15′28″N 9°9′7″E
- Country: Germany
- State: Schleswig-Holstein
- District: Dithmarschen
- Town: Süderheistedt

Area
  - Total: 2.86 km^{2} (1.10 sq mi)
- Elevation: 10 m (33 ft)

Population (2006-12-31)
  - Total: 53
  - Density: 19/km^{2} (48/sq mi)
- Time zone: UTC+01:00 (CET)
  - Summer (DST): UTC+02:00 (CEST)
- Postal codes: 25779
- Dialling codes: 04836
- Vehicle registration: HEI

Hägen (German pronunciation: [ˈhɛːɡn̩]) is a village and a former municipality in the district of Dithmarschen, in Schleswig-Holstein, Germany. Since 1 January 2009, it is part of the municipality Süderheistedt.
