= Krempel =

- Municipality
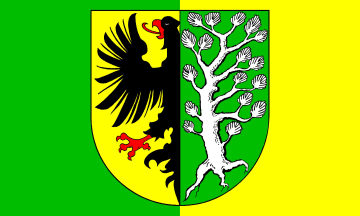
- Flag Coat of arms

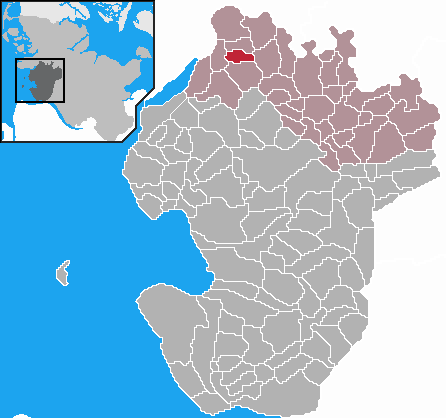
- Location of Krempel within Dithmarschen district
- Interactive map of Krempel
- Location within Germany Location within Schleswig-Holstein
- Coordinates: 54°19′N 9°1′E
- Country: Germany
- State: Schleswig-Holstein
- District: Dithmarschen
- Municipal assoc.: Eider

Government
  - Mayor: Ronald Petersen (SPD)

Area
  - Total: 4.82 km^{2} (1.86 sq mi)
- Elevation: 8 m (26 ft)

Population (2025-12-31)
  - Total: 603
  - Density: 125/km^{2} (324/sq mi)
- Time zone: UTC+01:00 (CET)
  - Summer (DST): UTC+02:00 (CEST)
- Postal codes: 25774
- Dialling codes: 04882
- Vehicle registration: HEI
- Website: gemeinden-lunden-lehe-krempel.de

For people with the surname, see Krempel (surname).

Krempel (German pronunciation: [ˈkʁɛmpl̩]) is a municipality in the district of Dithmarschen, in Schleswig-Holstein, Germany.
