= Schalkholz Passage Grave =

Neolithic burial site in Vierth, Germany

- Großsteingrab Schalkholz-Vierth
- Interactive map of Schalkholz Passage Grave
- Location: Schalkholz Vierth, Schleswig-Holstein, Germany
- Coordinates: 54°14′36.1″N 9°14′34.7″E
- Completion date: 3500-2800 BCE

The Schalkholz Passage Grave, also known as Schalkholz-Vierth (German: Großsteingrab Schalkholz-Vierth) is a megalithic burial site of the Neolithic period and of the Funnelbeaker culture in Vierth, a district of Schalkholz in the province of Schleswig-Holstein in Germany. During the late Bronze Age or early Iron Age, it was used for a secondary burial site and was expanded upon. It has the Sprockhoff number 139 and the site number LA 33 or Heide LA 5. The grave was archaeologically investigated in 1969 and 1970 and was afterwards moved to the nearby town of Heide. In 2021 it was moved back to Schalkholz.

== See also ==
- Neolithic
- Secondary burial
