= Sankt Annen =

- Municipality
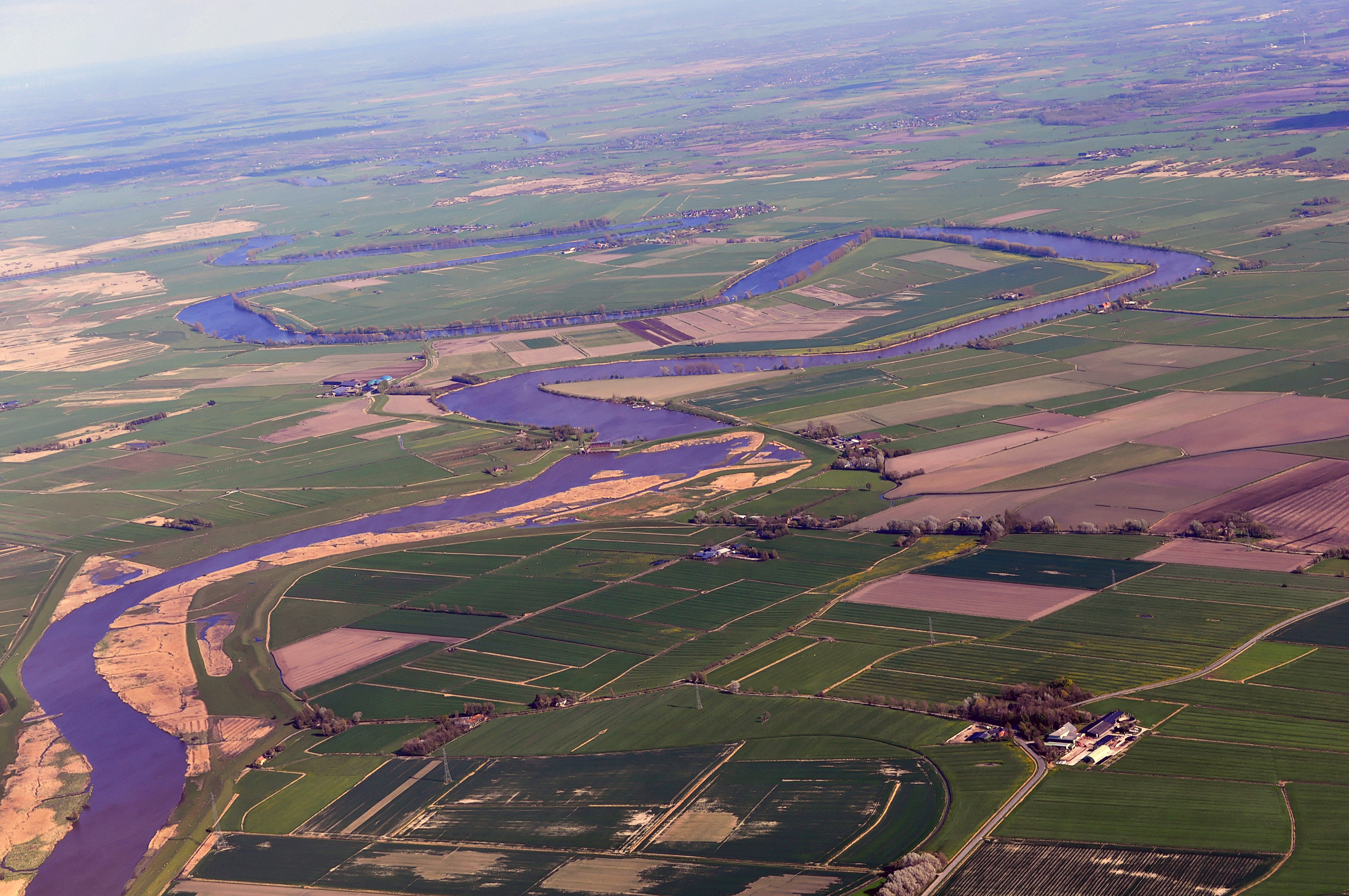

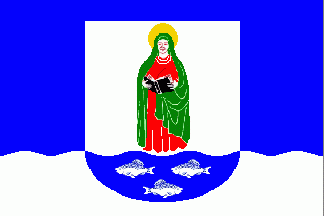
- Flag Coat of arms

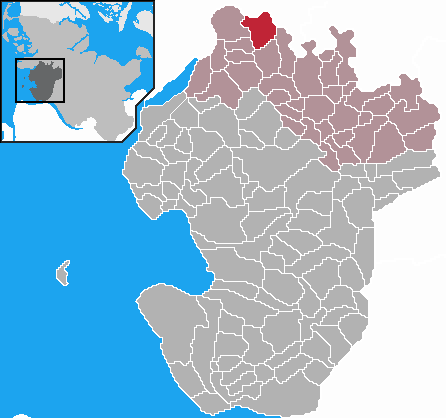
- Location of Sankt Annen within Dithmarschen district
- Interactive map of Sankt Annen
- Location within Germany Location within Schleswig-Holstein
- Coordinates: 54°21′11″N 9°4′37″E
- Country: Germany
- State: Schleswig-Holstein
- District: Dithmarschen
- Municipal assoc.: Eider
- Subdivisions: 3

Government
  - Mayor: Tjark Schütt

Area
  - Total: 14.89 km^{2} (5.75 sq mi)
- Elevation: 4 m (13 ft)

Population (2025-12-31)
  - Total: 312
  - Density: 21.0/km^{2} (54.3/sq mi)
- Time zone: UTC+01:00 (CET)
  - Summer (DST): UTC+02:00 (CEST)
- Postal codes: 25776
- Dialling codes: 04882
- Vehicle registration: HEI
- Website: www.amt-eider.de

Sankt Annen (German pronunciation: [zaŋkt ˈʔanən]) is a municipality in the district of Dithmarschen, in Schleswig-Holstein, Germany.
