= Wrohm =

- Municipality
- Coat of arms

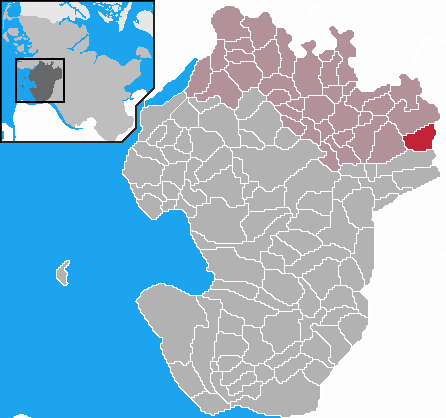
- Location of Wrohm within Dithmarschen district
- Interactive map of Wrohm
- Location within Germany Location within Schleswig-Holstein
- Coordinates: 54°13′N 9°24′E
- Country: Germany
- State: Schleswig-Holstein
- District: Dithmarschen
- Municipal assoc.: Eider
- Subdivisions: 4

Government
  - Mayor: Hans Otto Johannsen

Area
  - Total: 11.45 km^{2} (4.42 sq mi)
- Elevation: 5 m (16 ft)

Population (2025-12-31)
  - Total: 747
  - Density: 65.2/km^{2} (169/sq mi)
- Time zone: UTC+01:00 (CET)
  - Summer (DST): UTC+02:00 (CEST)
- Postal codes: 25799
- Dialling codes: 04802
- Vehicle registration: HEI
- Website: www.amt-eider.de

Wrohm (German pronunciation: [vʁoːm]) is a municipality in the district of Dithmarschen, in Schleswig-Holstein, Germany.
