= Hollingstedt, Dithmarschen =

Hollingstedt
- Municipality
- Coat of arms

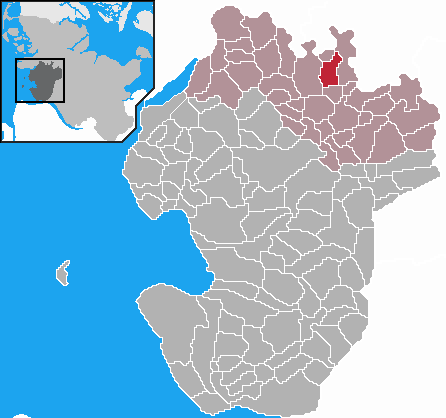
- Location of Hollingstedt within Dithmarschen district
- Interactive map of Hollingstedt
- Location within Germany Location within Schleswig-Holstein
- Coordinates: 54°18′N 9°13′E
- Country: Germany
- State: Schleswig-Holstein
- District: Dithmarschen
- Municipal assoc.: Eider
- Subdivisions: 3

Government
  - Mayor: Helmi Rau

Area
  - Total: 9.74 km^{2} (3.76 sq mi)
- Elevation: 5 m (16 ft)

Population (2025-12-31)
  - Total: 326
  - Density: 33.5/km^{2} (86.7/sq mi)
- Time zone: UTC+01:00 (CET)
  - Summer (DST): UTC+02:00 (CEST)
- Postal codes: 25788
- Dialling codes: 04836
- Vehicle registration: HEI
- Website: www.amt-eider.de

Hollingstedt (German pronunciation: [ˈhɔlɪŋʃtɛt]) is a municipality in the district of Dithmarschen, in Schleswig-Holstein, Germany.
