= Lunden =

- Municipality
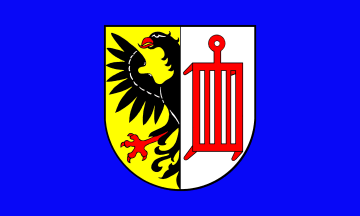
- Flag Coat of arms

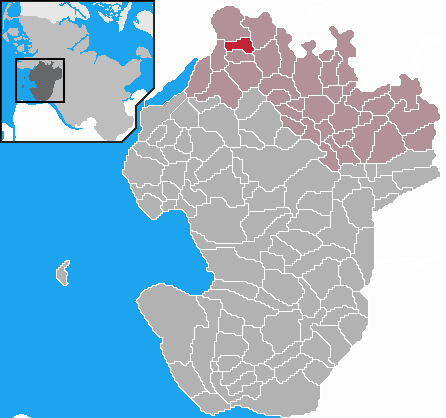
- Location of Lunden within Dithmarschen district
- Interactive map of Lunden
- Location within Germany Location within Schleswig-Holstein
- Coordinates: 54°20′N 9°1′E
- Country: Germany
- State: Schleswig-Holstein
- District: Dithmarschen
- Municipal assoc.: Eider

Government
  - Mayor: Jörn Walter (SPD)

Area
  - Total: 4.65 km^{2} (1.80 sq mi)
- Elevation: 9 m (30 ft)

Population (2025-12-31)
  - Total: 1,761
  - Density: 379/km^{2} (981/sq mi)
- Time zone: UTC+01:00 (CET)
  - Summer (DST): UTC+02:00 (CEST)
- Postal codes: 25774
- Dialling codes: 04882
- Vehicle registration: HEI
- Website: gemeinden-lunden-lehe-krempel.de

Lunden (German pronunciation: [ˈlʊndn̩]; Low German: Lunnen) is a municipality in the district of Dithmarschen, in Schleswig-Holstein, Germany. It is situated on the Eider river, about 16 km north of Heide. It is part of the Amt Kirchspielslandgemeinde ("collective municipality") of Eider.

The first written mention of Lunden is by the Archbishop of Bremen and dates back as early as 1140. The place name probably comes from the Danish "Lunn" (island-like survey) or "Lund"(little forest).

In 1513, a Franciscan Friary was constructed in Lunden, fulfilling a vow made by the Dithmarscher soldiers at the Battle of Hemmingstedt in 1500 to donate a monastery in honor of Mary of Nazareth if they won the battle.

On 27 February 1529 Lunden was granted a town charter by the National Assembly of Dithmarschen. In 1559, after the peasants' republic in Dithmarschen was defeated by Denmark, this right was lost.

From 1806 to 1816, the famous Lutheran theologian Claus Harms served as pastor of Lunden.

Lunden is twinned with the town of Romford in London.
