= Rehm-Flehde-Bargen =

- Municipality
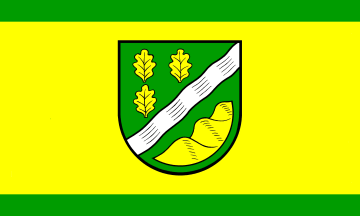
- Flag Coat of arms

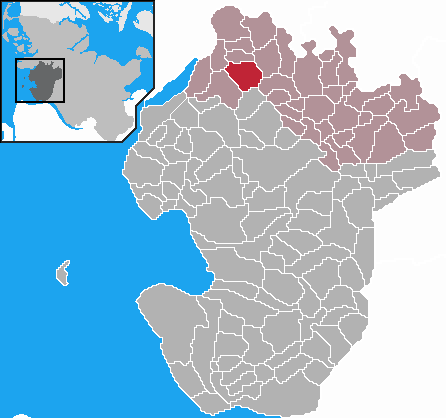
- Location of Rehm-Flehde-Bargen within Dithmarschen district
- Interactive map of Rehm-Flehde-Bargen
- Location within Germany Location within Schleswig-Holstein
- Coordinates: 54°16′N 9°1′E
- Country: Germany
- State: Schleswig-Holstein
- District: Dithmarschen
- Municipal assoc.: Eider
- Subdivisions: 3

Government
  - Mayor: Daniela Donarski

Area
  - Total: 14.63 km^{2} (5.65 sq mi)
- Elevation: 1 m (3.3 ft)

Population (2025-12-31)
  - Total: 544
  - Density: 37.2/km^{2} (96.3/sq mi)
- Time zone: UTC+01:00 (CET)
  - Summer (DST): UTC+02:00 (CEST)
- Postal codes: 25776
- Dialling codes: 04882, 04837
- Vehicle registration: HEI
- Website: www.amt-eider.de

Rehm-Flehde-Bargen (German pronunciation: [ˈʁeːm ˈfleːdə ˈbaʁɡn̩]) is a municipality in the district of Dithmarschen, in Schleswig-Holstein, Germany.
