= Groven =

- Municipality
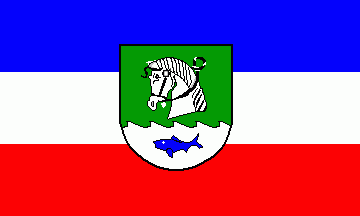
- Flag Coat of arms

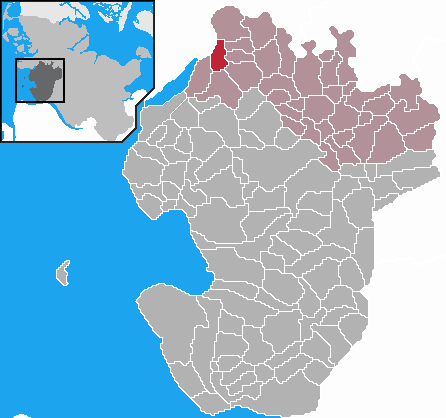
- Location of Groven within Dithmarschen district
- Interactive map of Groven
- Location within Germany Location within Schleswig-Holstein
- Coordinates: 54°18′N 8°59′E
- Country: Germany
- State: Schleswig-Holstein
- District: Dithmarschen
- Municipal assoc.: Eider
- Subdivisions: 5

Government
  - Mayor: Georg Döbel

Area
  - Total: 7.9 km^{2} (3.1 sq mi)
- Elevation: 0 m (0 ft)

Population (2025-12-31)
  - Total: 101
  - Density: 13/km^{2} (33/sq mi)
- Time zone: UTC+01:00 (CET)
  - Summer (DST): UTC+02:00 (CEST)
- Postal codes: 25774
- Dialling codes: 04882
- Vehicle registration: HEI
- Website: www.amt-eider.de

Groven is a municipality in the district of Dithmarschen, in Schleswig-Holstein, Germany.
