= Linden, Schleswig-Holstein =

Linden
- Municipality
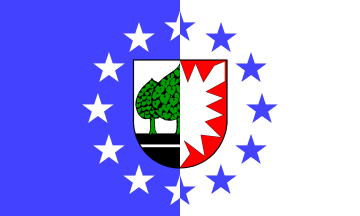
- Flag Coat of arms

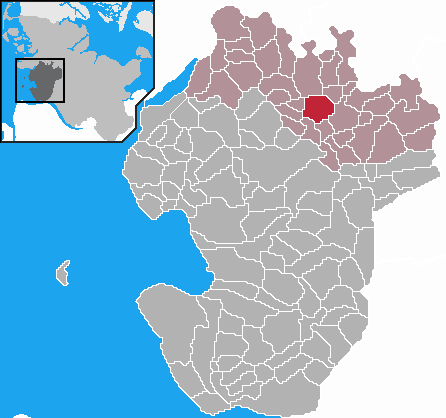
- Location of Linden within Dithmarschen district
- Interactive map of Linden
- Location within Germany Location within Schleswig-Holstein
- Coordinates: 54°15′15″N 9°11′3″E
- Country: Germany
- State: Schleswig-Holstein
- District: Dithmarschen
- Municipal assoc.: Eider
- Subdivisions: 4

Government
  - Mayor: Willi Köster

Area
  - Total: 11.62 km^{2} (4.49 sq mi)
- Elevation: 23 m (75 ft)

Population (2025-12-31)
  - Total: 848
  - Density: 73.0/km^{2} (189/sq mi)
- Time zone: UTC+01:00 (CET)
  - Summer (DST): UTC+02:00 (CEST)
- Postal codes: 25791
- Dialling codes: 04836
- Vehicle registration: HEI
- Website: www.amt-eider.de

Linden (German pronunciation: [ˈlɪndn̩]) is a municipality in the district of Dithmarschen, in Schleswig-Holstein, Germany.
