= Kleve, Dithmarschen =

Kleve
- Municipality
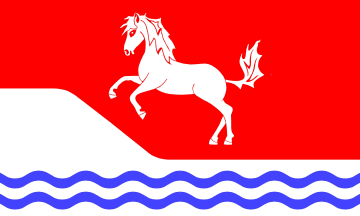
- Flag Coat of arms

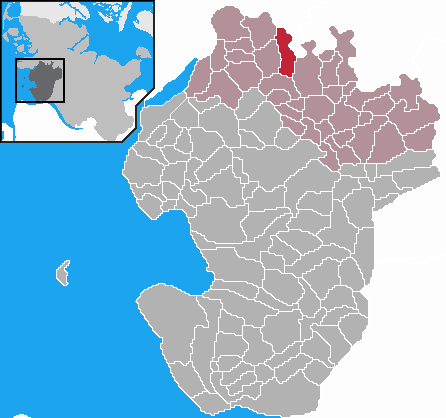
- Location of Kleve within Dithmarschen district
- Interactive map of Kleve
- Location within Germany Location within Schleswig-Holstein
- Coordinates: 54°18′N 9°8′E
- Country: Germany
- State: Schleswig-Holstein
- District: Dithmarschen
- Municipal assoc.: Eider
- Subdivisions: 4

Government
  - Mayor: Werner Oetjens

Area
  - Total: 12.81 km^{2} (4.95 sq mi)
- Elevation: 4 m (13 ft)

Population (2025-12-31)
  - Total: 411
  - Density: 32.1/km^{2} (83.1/sq mi)
- Time zone: UTC+01:00 (CET)
  - Summer (DST): UTC+02:00 (CEST)
- Postal codes: 25776–25789
- Dialling codes: 04836
- Vehicle registration: HEI
- Website: www.amt-eider.de

Kleve (German pronunciation: [ˈkleːvə]) is a municipality in the district of Dithmarschen, in Schleswig-Holstein, Germany.
