= Wiemerstedt =

- Municipality
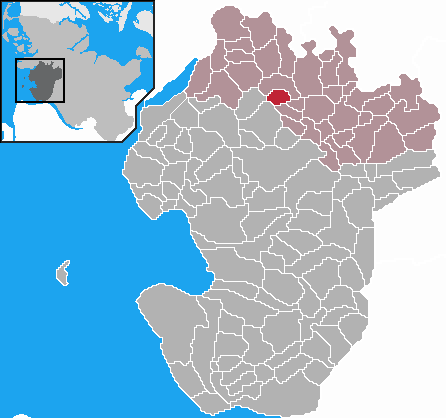
- Location of Wiemerstedt within Dithmarschen district
- Interactive map of Wiemerstedt
- Location within Germany Location within Schleswig-Holstein
- Coordinates: 54°16′N 9°7′E
- Country: Germany
- State: Schleswig-Holstein
- District: Dithmarschen
- Municipal assoc.: Eider

Government
  - Mayor: Jens Peters

Area
  - Total: 5.08 km^{2} (1.96 sq mi)
- Elevation: 4 m (13 ft)

Population (2025-12-31)
  - Total: 155
  - Density: 30.5/km^{2} (79.0/sq mi)
- Time zone: UTC+01:00 (CET)
  - Summer (DST): UTC+02:00 (CEST)
- Postal codes: 25779
- Dialling codes: 04836
- Vehicle registration: HEI
- Website: www.amt-eider.de

Wiemerstedt is a municipality in the district of Dithmarschen, in Schleswig-Holstein, Germany.
