= Delve, Schleswig-Holstein =

Delve
- Municipality
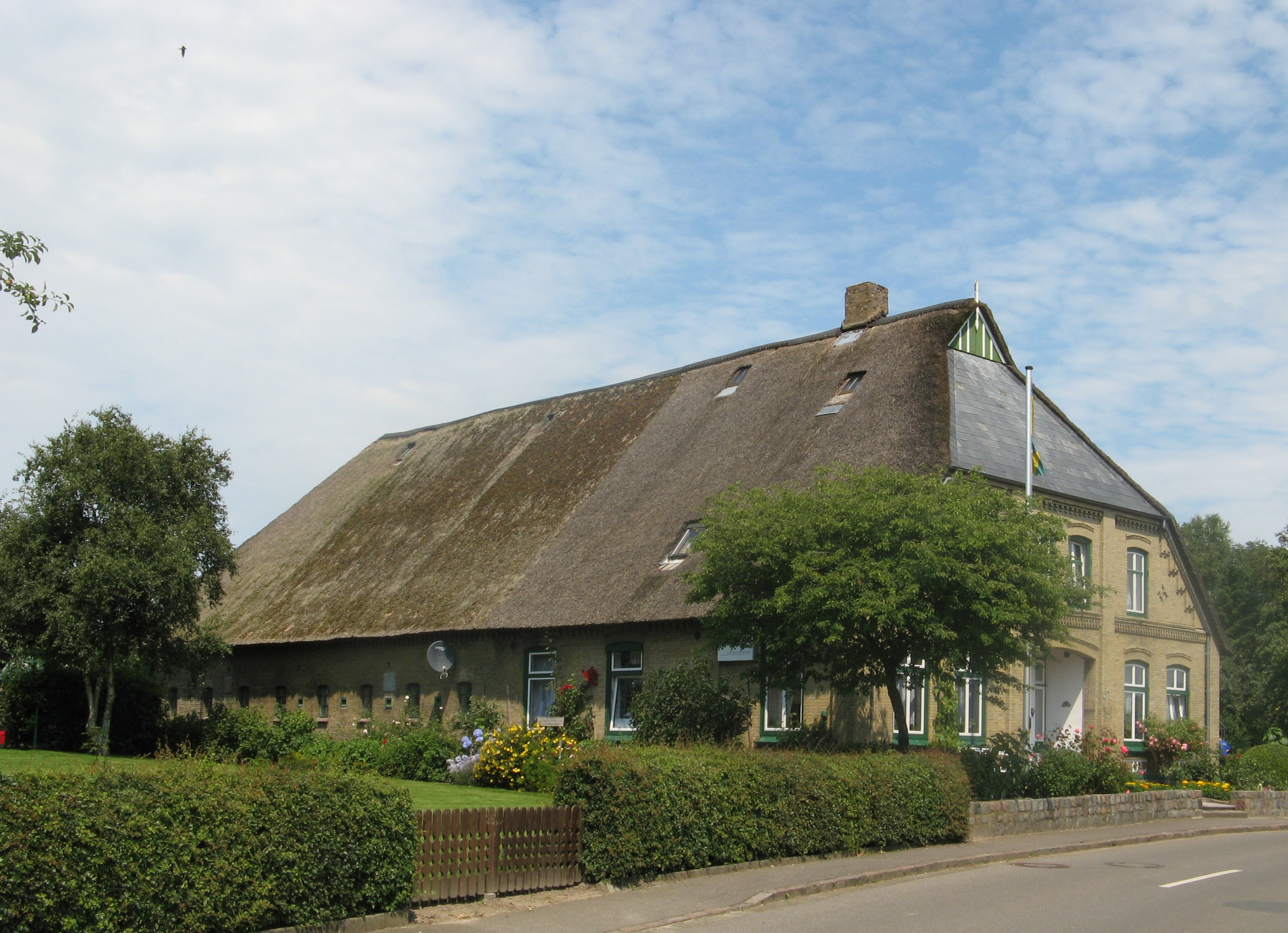

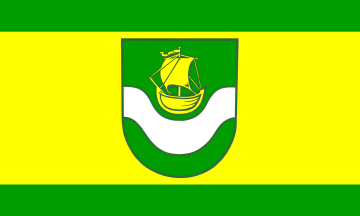
- Flag Coat of arms

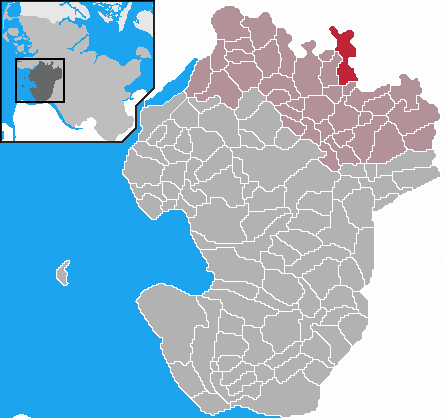
- Location of Delve within Dithmarschen district
- Interactive map of Delve
- Location within Germany Location within Schleswig-Holstein
- Coordinates: 54°18′10″N 9°15′3″E
- Country: Germany
- State: Schleswig-Holstein
- District: Dithmarschen
- Municipal assoc.: Eider (Amt)

Government
  - Mayor: Matthias Retzlaff

Area
  - Total: 15.84 km^{2} (6.12 sq mi)
- Elevation: 5 m (16 ft)

Population (2025-12-31)
  - Total: 769
  - Density: 48.5/km^{2} (126/sq mi)
- Time zone: UTC+01:00 (CET)
  - Summer (DST): UTC+02:00 (CEST)
- Postal codes: 25788
- Dialling codes: 04803, 04836
- Vehicle registration: HEI

Delve (German pronunciation: [ˈdɛlvə]) is a municipality belonging to the Amt Kirchspielslandgemeinde ("collective municipality") Eider in the district Dithmarschen in Schleswig-Holstein, in northern Germany.

The municipality covers an area of 15.85 km^{2} (6.12 sq mi).

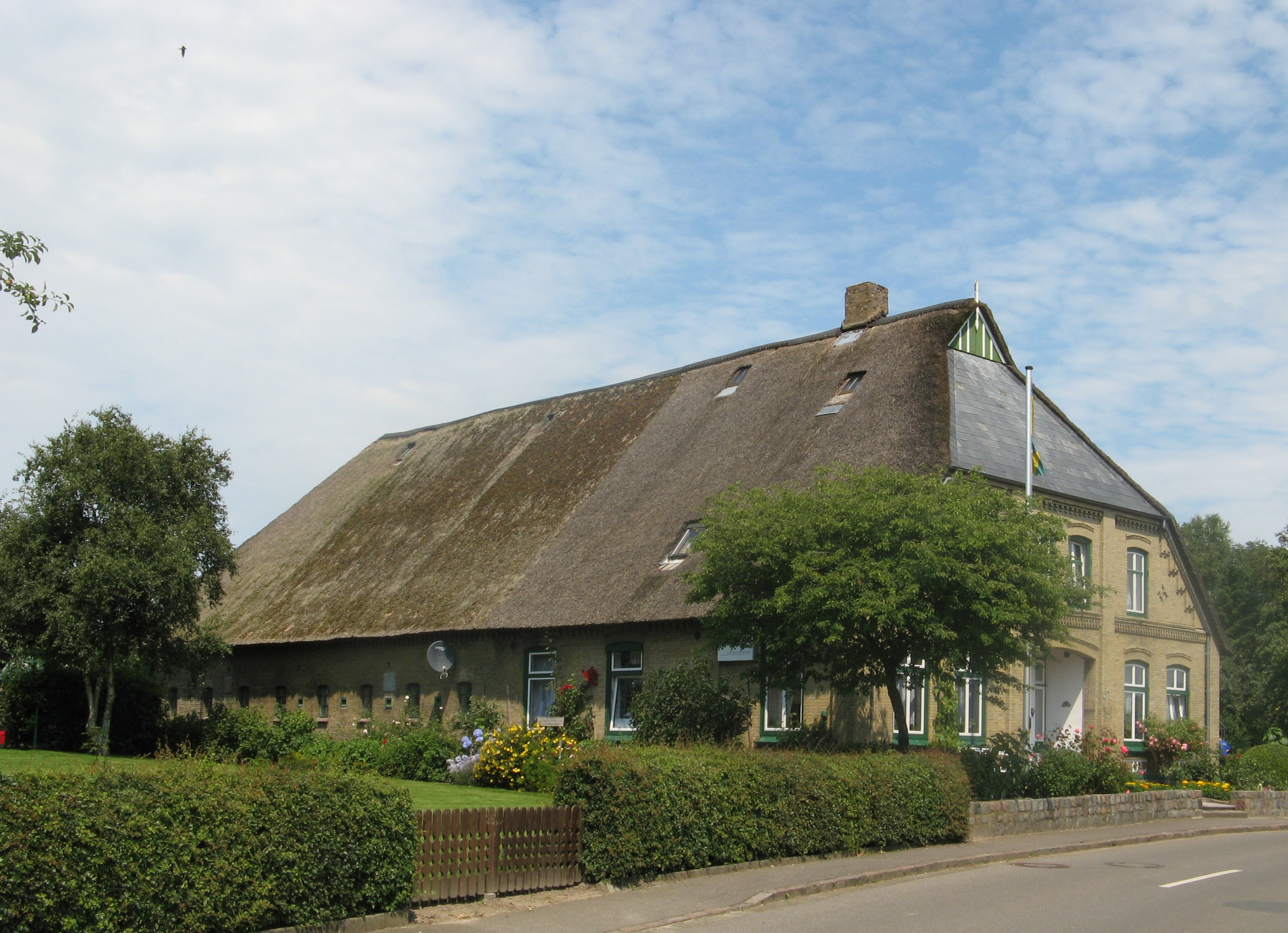
House in Delve

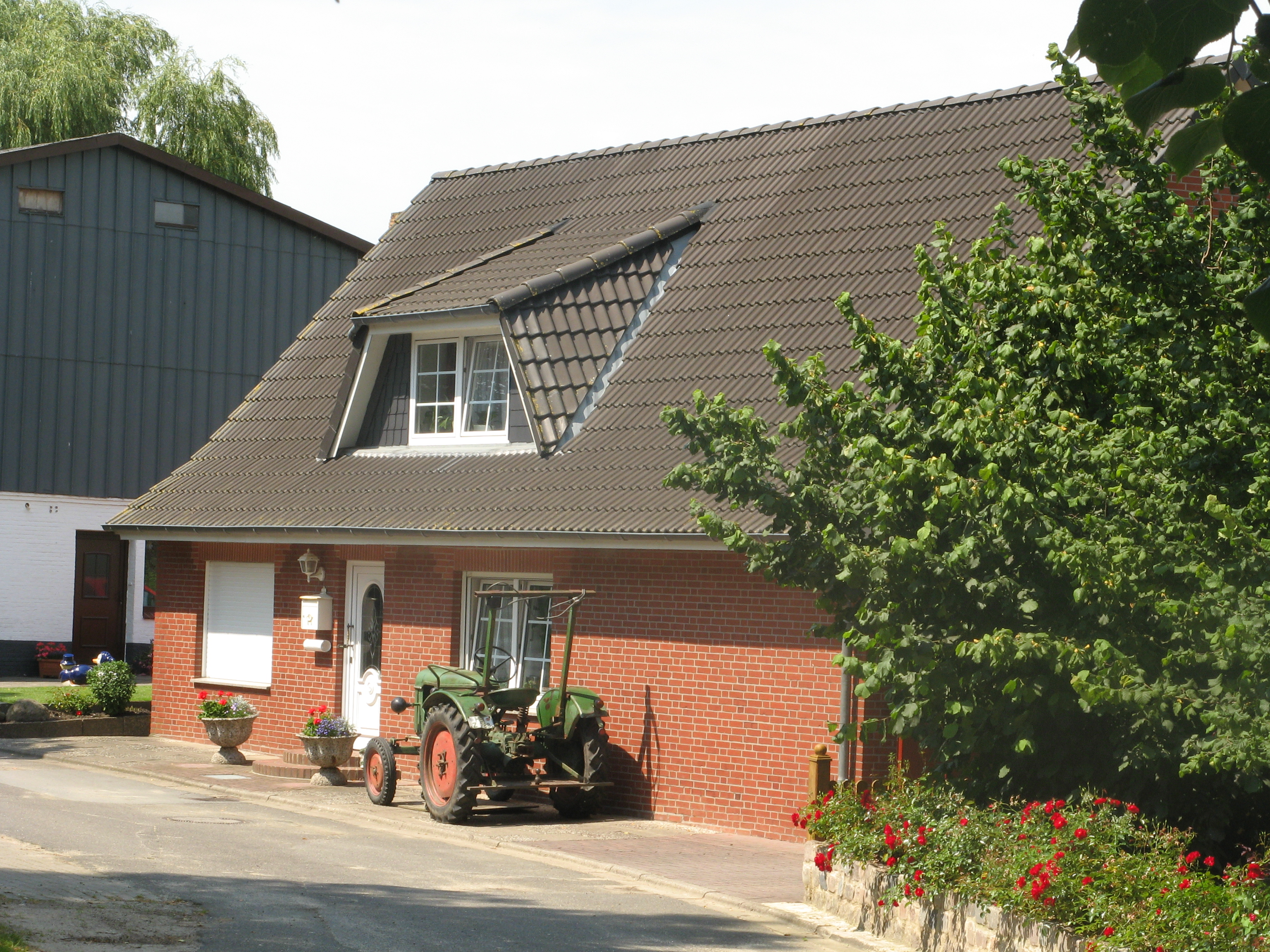
House in Delve

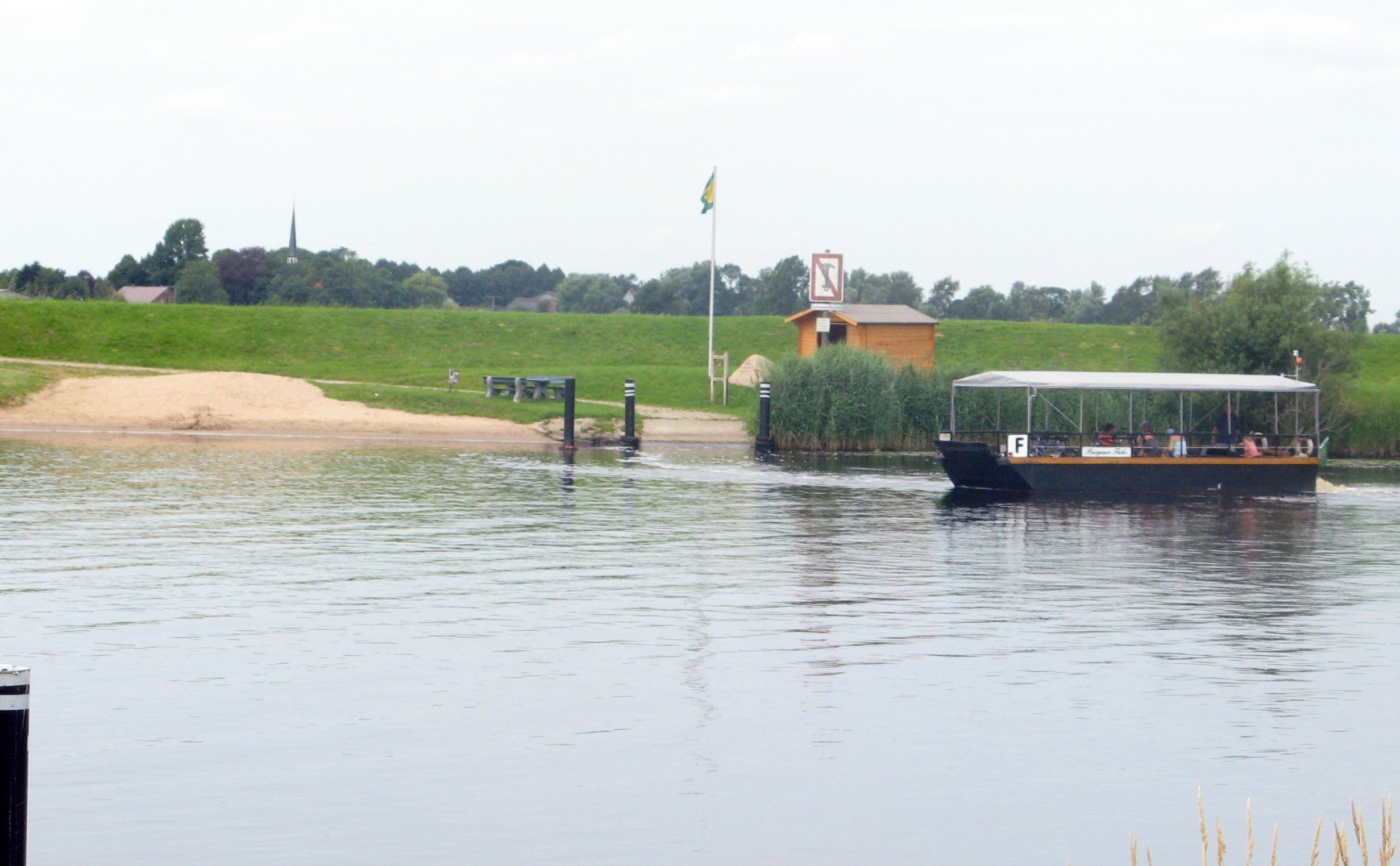
The Eider ferry near Delve

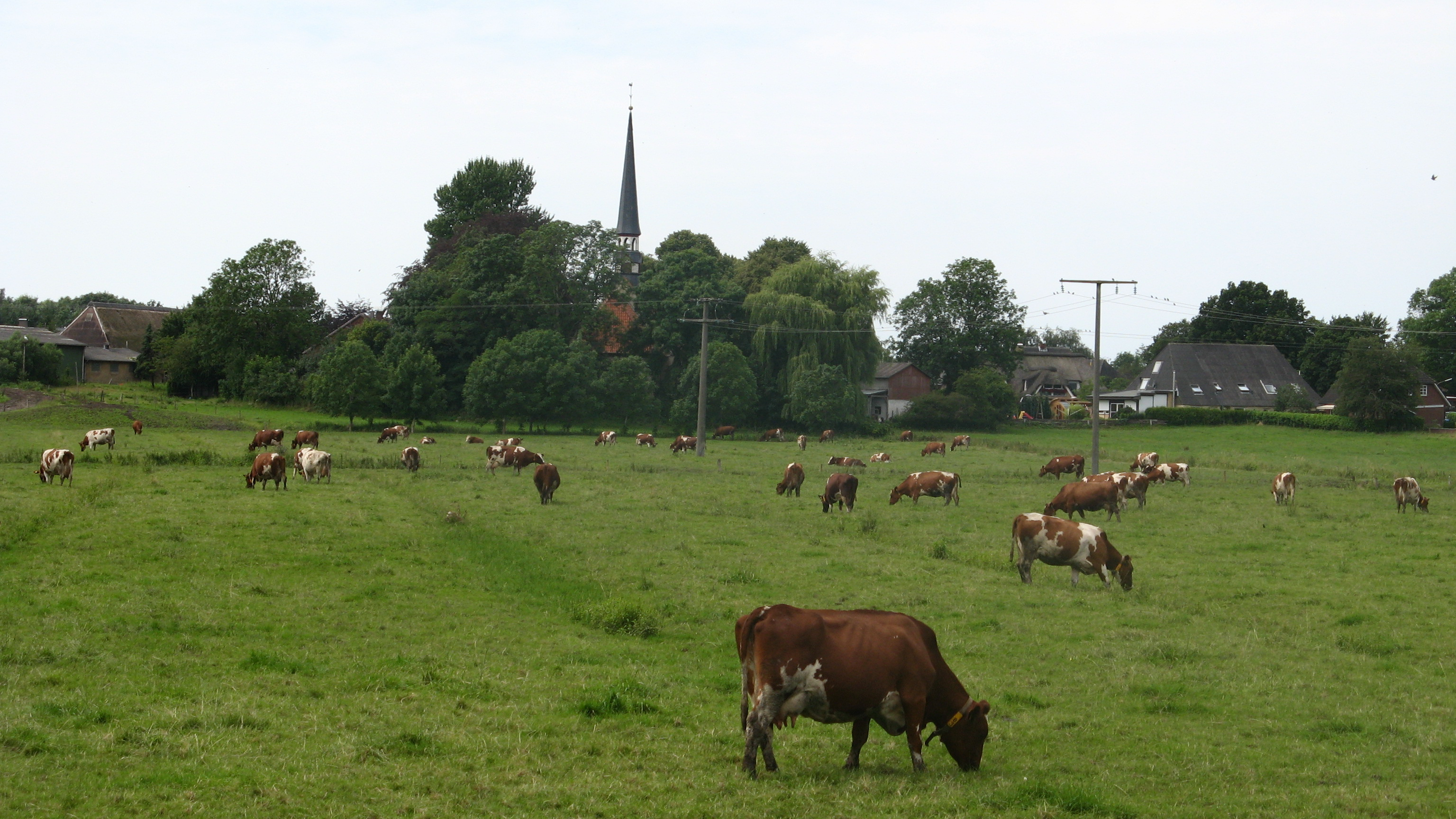
Delve Church
