= Westerborstel =

- Municipality
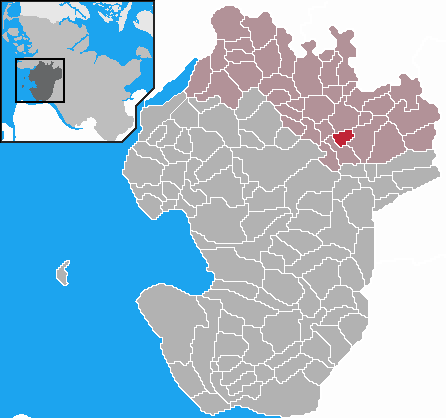
- Location of Westerborstel within Dithmarschen district
- Interactive map of Westerborstel
- Location within Germany Location within Schleswig-Holstein
- Coordinates: 54°13′18″N 9°15′44″E
- Country: Germany
- State: Schleswig-Holstein
- District: Dithmarschen
- Municipal assoc.: Eider

Government
  - Mayor: Dieter Grimm

Area
  - Total: 4.14 km^{2} (1.60 sq mi)
- Elevation: 13 m (43 ft)

Population (2025-12-31)
  - Total: 105
  - Density: 25.4/km^{2} (65.7/sq mi)
- Time zone: UTC+01:00 (CET)
  - Summer (DST): UTC+02:00 (CEST)
- Postal codes: 25782
- Dialling codes: 04838
- Vehicle registration: HEI
- Website: www.amt-eider.de

Westerborstel is a municipality in the district of Dithmarschen, in Schleswig-Holstein, Germany.
