= Gaushorn =

- Municipality
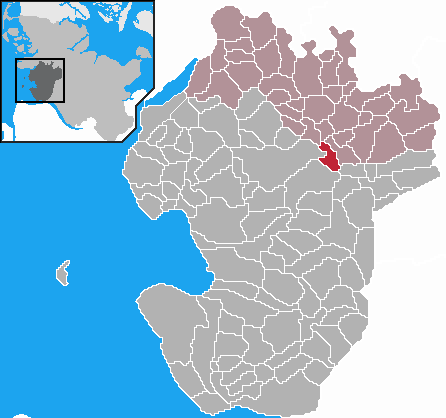
- Location of Gaushorn within Dithmarschen district
- Interactive map of Gaushorn
- Location within Germany Location within Schleswig-Holstein
- Coordinates: 54°11′45″N 9°13′35″E
- Country: Germany
- State: Schleswig-Holstein
- District: Dithmarschen
- Municipal assoc.: Eider

Government
  - Mayor: Ernst Schnepel

Area
  - Total: 6.45 km^{2} (2.49 sq mi)
- Elevation: 58 m (190 ft)

Population (2025-12-31)
  - Total: 178
  - Density: 27.6/km^{2} (71.5/sq mi)
- Time zone: UTC+01:00 (CET)
  - Summer (DST): UTC+02:00 (CEST)
- Postal codes: 25782
- Dialling codes: 04838
- Vehicle registration: HEI
- Website: www.amt-eider.de

Gaushorn is a municipality in the district of Dithmarschen, in Schleswig-Holstein, Germany.
