= Schlichting, Germany =

Schlichting
- Municipality
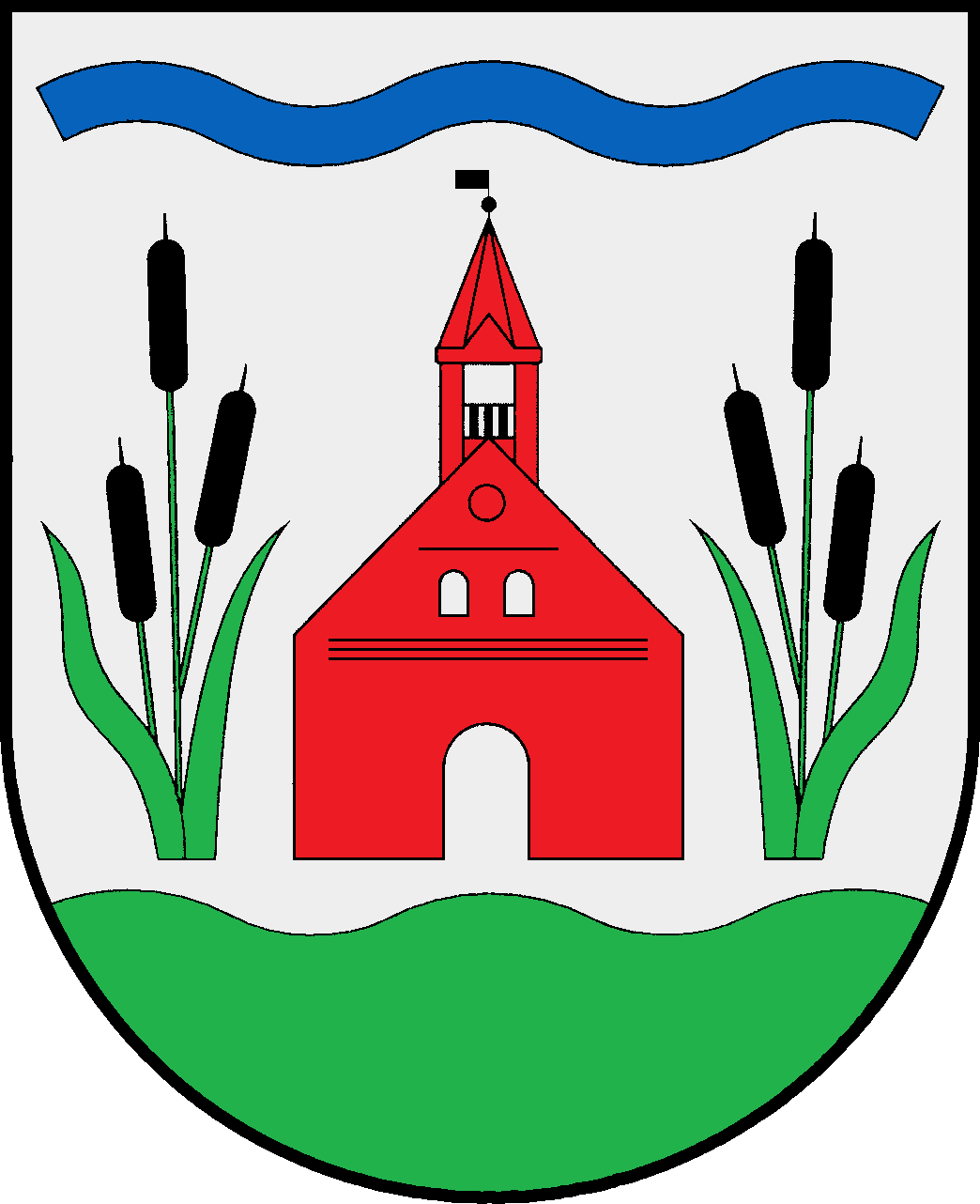
- Coat of arms

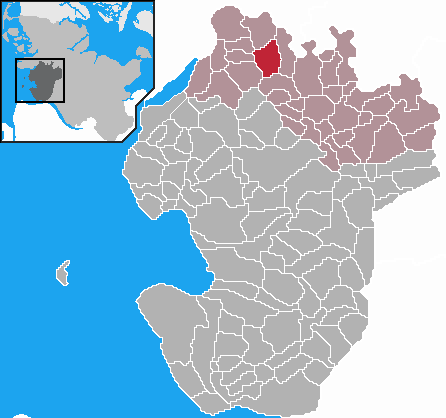
- Location of Schlichting within Dithmarschen district
- Interactive map of Schlichting
- Location within Germany Location within Schleswig-Holstein
- Coordinates: 54°19′N 9°4′E
- Country: Germany
- State: Schleswig-Holstein
- District: Dithmarschen
- Municipal assoc.: Eider
- Subdivisions: 5

Government
  - Mayor: Herbert Voß

Area
  - Total: 12.5 km^{2} (4.8 sq mi)
- Elevation: 7 m (23 ft)

Population (2025-12-31)
  - Total: 244
  - Density: 19.5/km^{2} (50.6/sq mi)
- Time zone: UTC+01:00 (CET)
  - Summer (DST): UTC+02:00 (CEST)
- Postal codes: 25779
- Dialling codes: 04836 - 04882
- Vehicle registration: HEI
- Website: www.amt-eider.de

Schlichting is a municipality in the district of Dithmarschen, in Schleswig-Holstein, Germany.

Schlichting

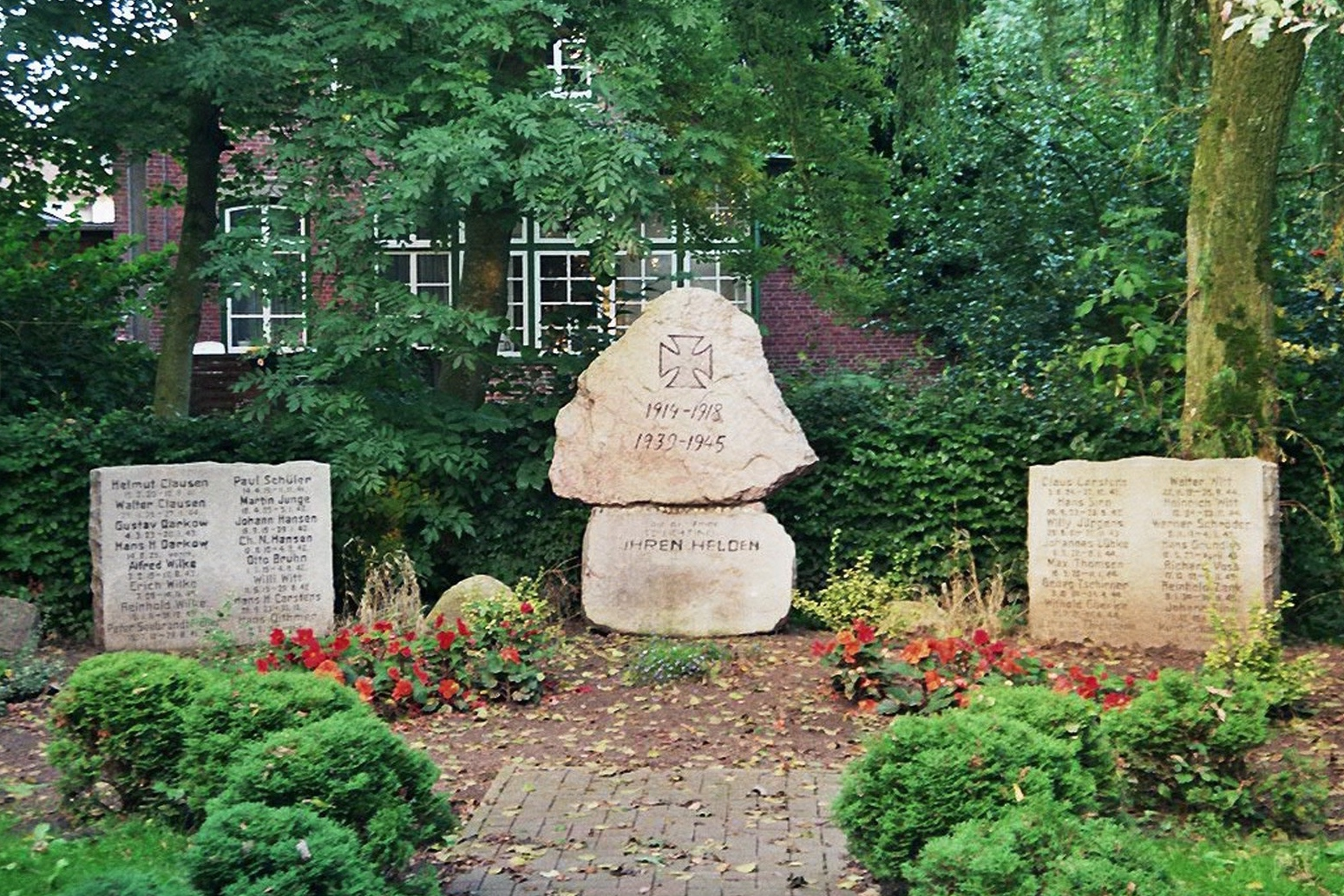

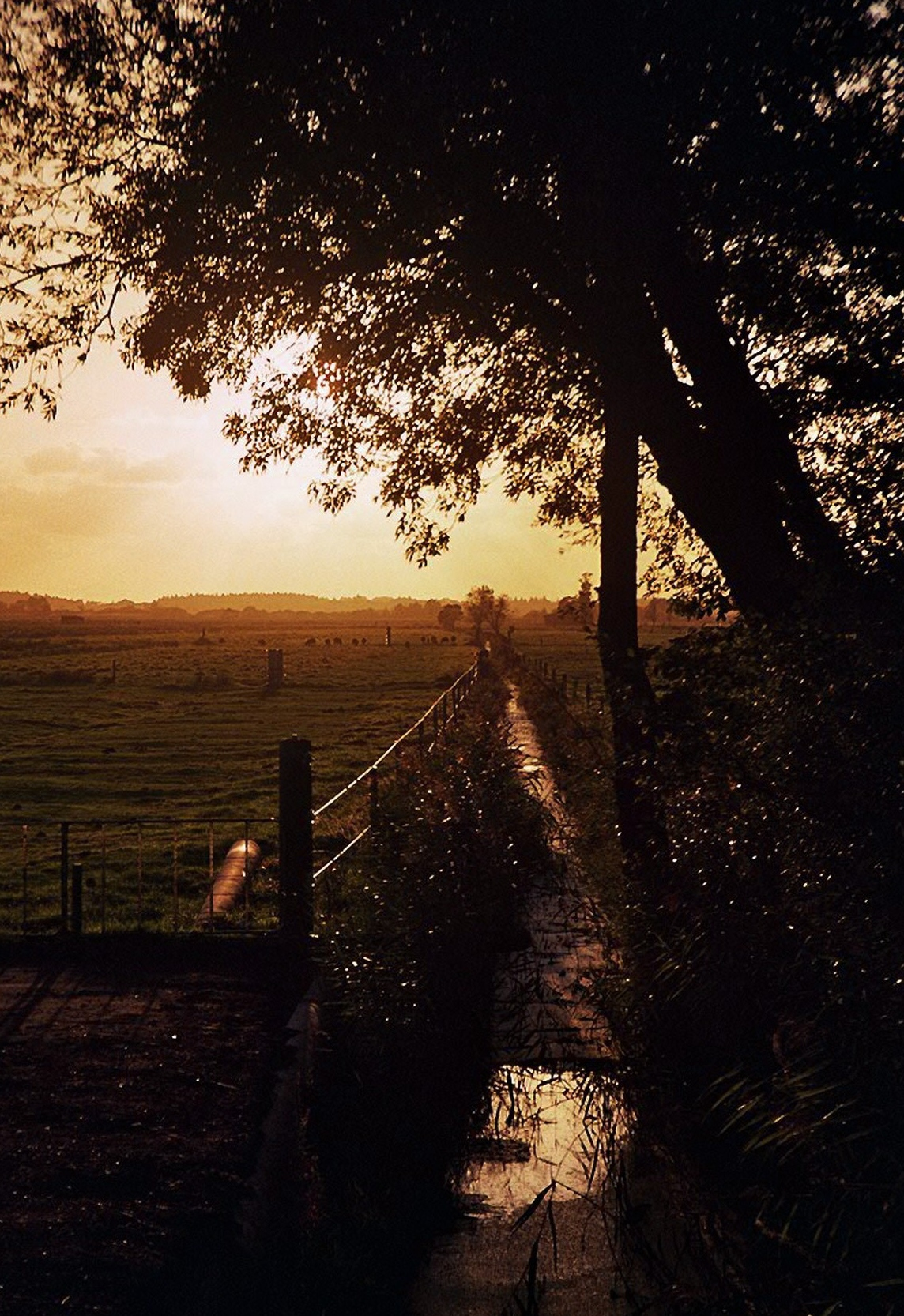

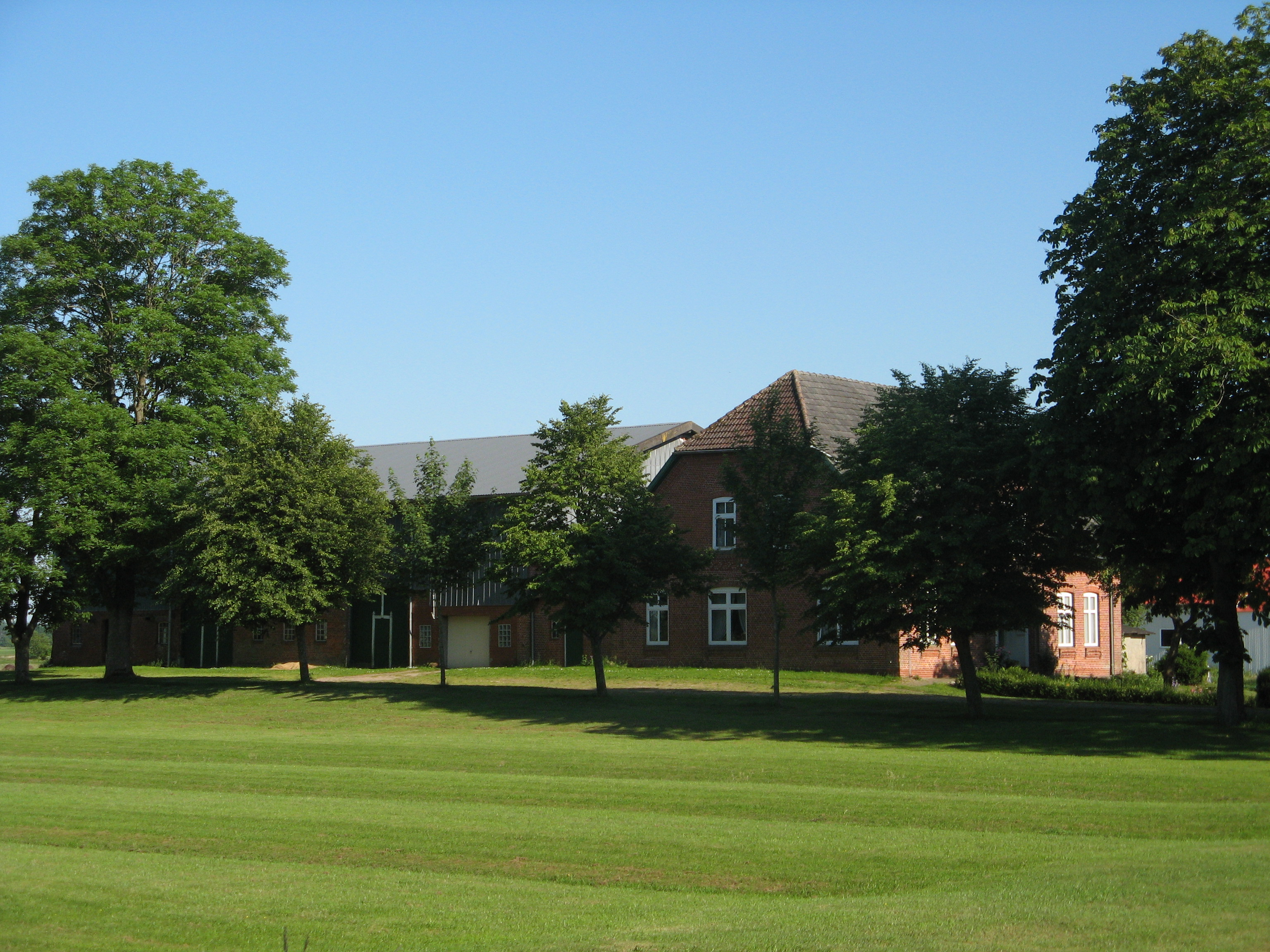

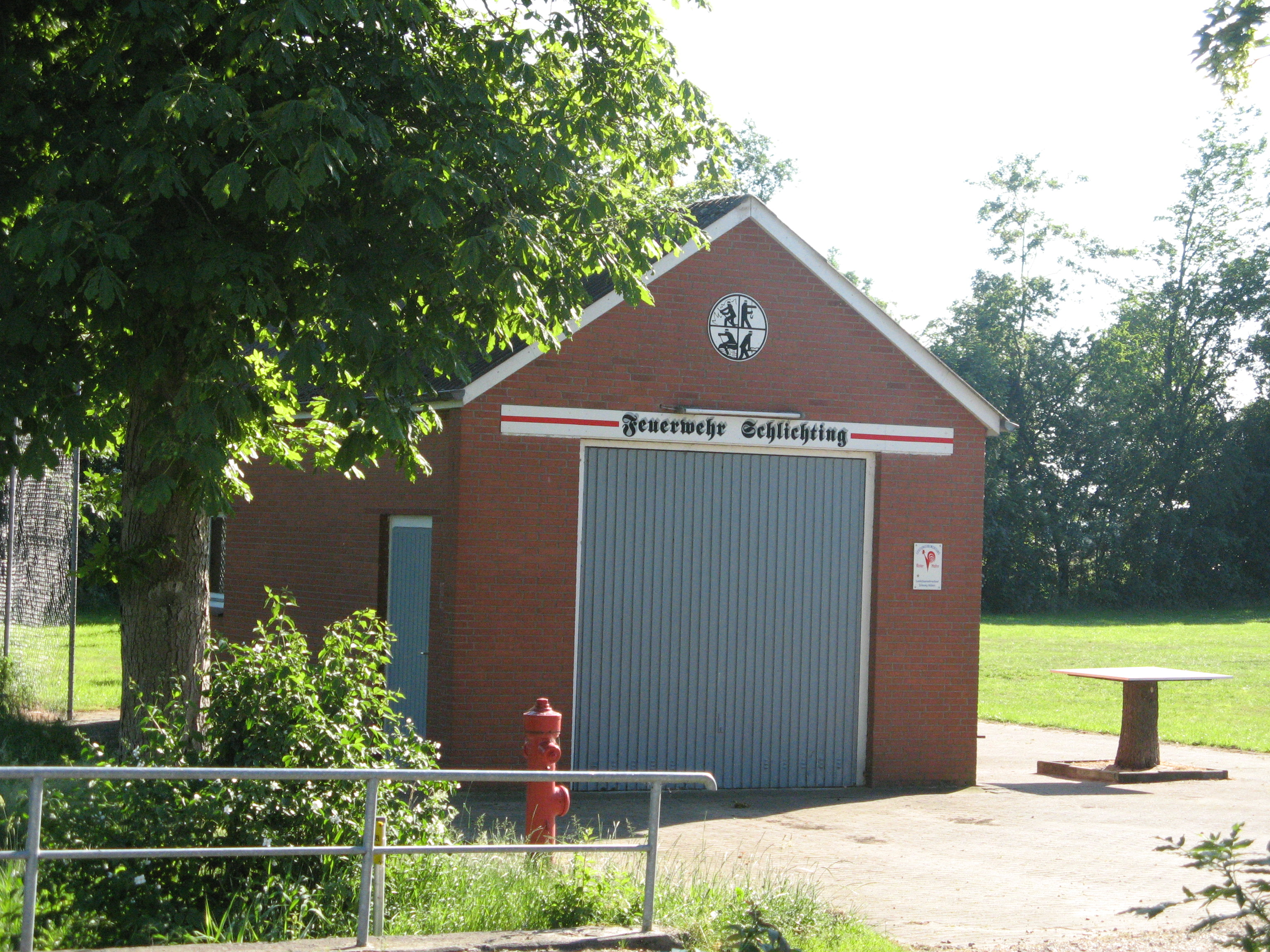
