= Tellingstedt =

- Municipality
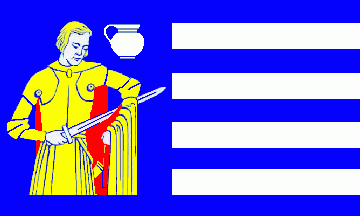
- Flag Coat of arms

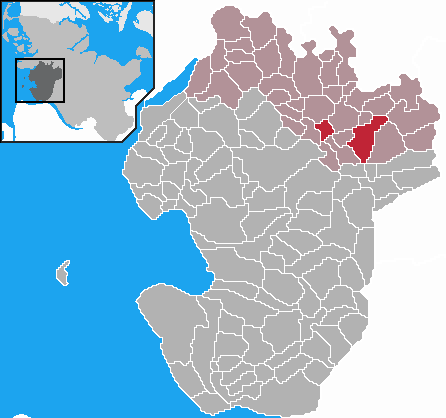
- Location of Tellingstedt within Dithmarschen district
- Interactive map of Tellingstedt
- Location within Germany Location within Schleswig-Holstein
- Coordinates: 54°13′N 9°17′E
- Country: Germany
- State: Schleswig-Holstein
- District: Dithmarschen
- Municipal assoc.: Eider

Government
  - Mayor: Helmut Meyer

Area
  - Total: 21.1 km^{2} (8.1 sq mi)
- Elevation: 25 m (82 ft)

Population (2025-12-31)
  - Total: 2,792
  - Density: 132/km^{2} (343/sq mi)
- Time zone: UTC+01:00 (CET)
  - Summer (DST): UTC+02:00 (CEST)
- Postal codes: 25782
- Dialling codes: 04838
- Vehicle registration: HEI
- Website: www.amt-tellingstedt.de

Tellingstedt (German pronunciation: [ˈtɛlɪŋʃtɛt]) is a municipality in the district of Dithmarschen, in Schleswig-Holstein, Germany. It is situated approximately 13 km east of Heide.

Tellingstedt is part of the Amt Kirchspielslandgemeinde ("collective municipality") Eider.
