= Hemme =

- Municipality
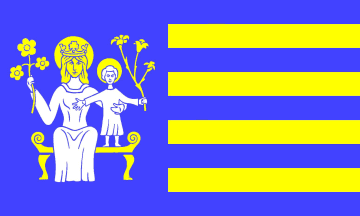
- Flag Coat of arms

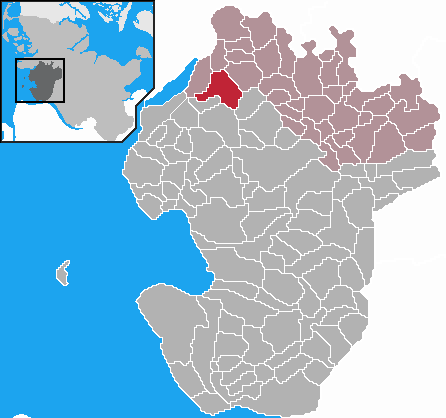
- Location of Hemme within Dithmarschen district
- Interactive map of Hemme
- Location within Germany Location within Schleswig-Holstein
- Coordinates: 54°16′N 9°1′E
- Country: Germany
- State: Schleswig-Holstein
- District: Dithmarschen
- Municipal assoc.: Eider
- Subdivisions: 3

Government
  - Mayor: Hans-Peter Witt

Area
  - Total: 16.53 km^{2} (6.38 sq mi)
- Elevation: 2 m (6.6 ft)

Population (2025-12-31)
  - Total: 520
  - Density: 31/km^{2} (81/sq mi)
- Time zone: UTC+01:00 (CET)
  - Summer (DST): UTC+02:00 (CEST)
- Postal codes: 25774
- Dialling codes: 04837, 04882
- Vehicle registration: HEI
- Website: www.amt-eider.de

Hemme (German pronunciation: [ˈhɛmə]) is a municipality in the district of Dithmarschen, in Schleswig-Holstein, Germany.
