= Süderdorf =

- Municipality
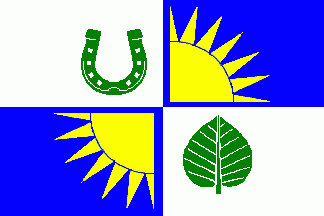
- Flag Coat of arms

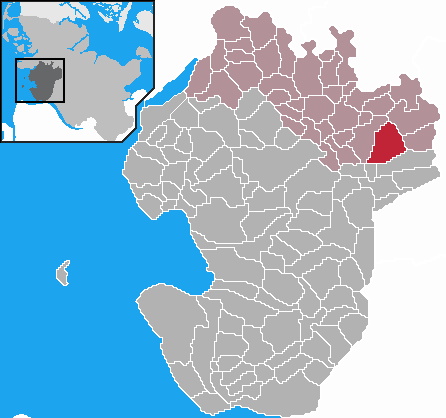
- Location of Süderdorf within Dithmarschen district
- Interactive map of Süderdorf
- Location within Germany Location within Schleswig-Holstein
- Coordinates: 54°13′N 9°21′E
- Country: Germany
- State: Schleswig-Holstein
- District: Dithmarschen
- Municipal assoc.: Eider
- Subdivisions: 4

Government
  - Mayor: Klaus-Willi Hinrichs

Area
  - Total: 16.21 km^{2} (6.26 sq mi)
- Elevation: 19 m (62 ft)

Population (2025-12-31)
  - Total: 354
  - Density: 21.8/km^{2} (56.6/sq mi)
- Time zone: UTC+01:00 (CET)
  - Summer (DST): UTC+02:00 (CEST)
- Postal codes: 25782
- Dialling codes: 04802, 04838
- Vehicle registration: HEI
- Website: www.amt-eider.de

Süderdorf (German pronunciation: [ˈzyːdɐdɔʁf]) is a municipality in the district of Dithmarschen, in Schleswig-Holstein, Germany.
