= Fedderingen =

- Municipality
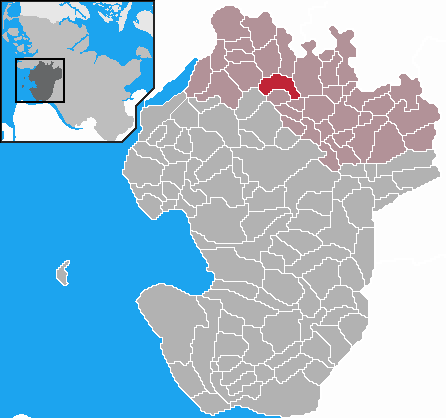
- Location of Fedderingen within Dithmarschen district
- Interactive map of Fedderingen
- Location within Germany Location within Schleswig-Holstein
- Coordinates: 54°17′N 9°8′E
- Country: Germany
- State: Schleswig-Holstein
- District: Dithmarschen
- Municipal assoc.: Eider

Government
  - Mayor: Gabriele Beetz

Area
  - Total: 9.69 km^{2} (3.74 sq mi)
- Elevation: 10 m (33 ft)

Population (2025-12-31)
  - Total: 261
  - Density: 26.9/km^{2} (69.8/sq mi)
- Time zone: UTC+01:00 (CET)
  - Summer (DST): UTC+02:00 (CEST)
- Postal codes: 25779
- Dialling codes: 04836
- Vehicle registration: HEI
- Website: www.amt-eider.de

Fedderingen (German pronunciation: [ˈfɛdəʁɪŋən]) is a municipality in the district of Dithmarschen, in Schleswig-Holstein, Germany.
