= Dellstedt =

- Municipality
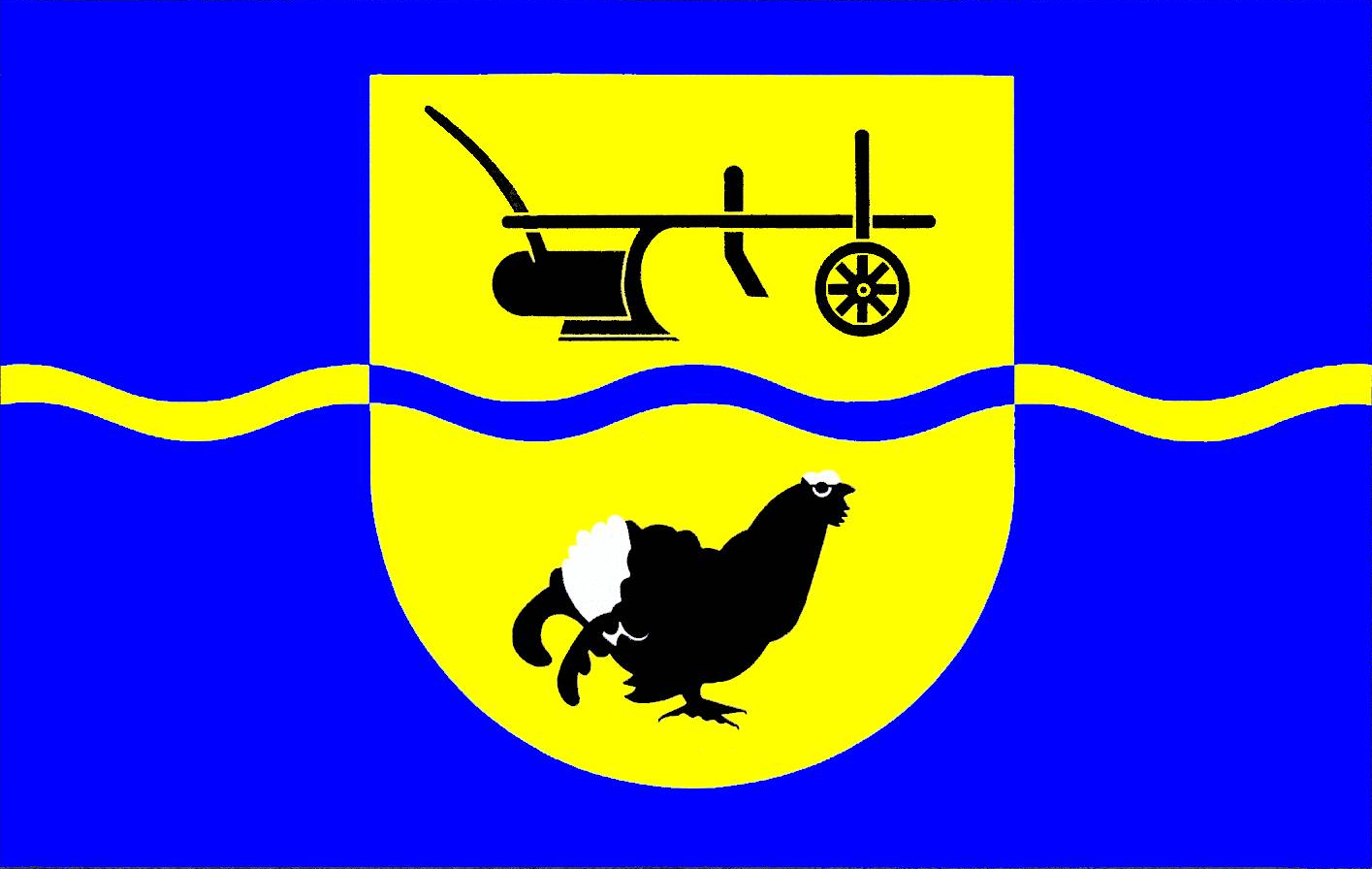
- Flag Coat of arms

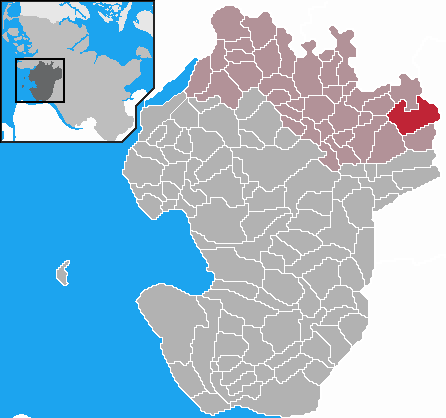
- Location of Dellstedt within Dithmarschen district
- Interactive map of Dellstedt
- Location within Germany Location within Schleswig-Holstein
- Coordinates: 54°14′N 9°22′E
- Country: Germany
- State: Schleswig-Holstein
- District: Dithmarschen
- Municipal assoc.: Eider
- Subdivisions: 3

Government
  - Mayor: Klaus-Dieter Holm (CDU)

Area
  - Total: 21.77 km^{2} (8.41 sq mi)
- Elevation: 18 m (59 ft)

Population (2025-12-31)
  - Total: 740
  - Density: 34/km^{2} (88/sq mi)
- Time zone: UTC+01:00 (CET)
  - Summer (DST): UTC+02:00 (CEST)
- Postal codes: 25786
- Dialling codes: 04802
- Vehicle registration: HEI
- Website: www.amt-eider.de

Dellstedt (German pronunciation: [ˈdɛlʃtɛt]) is a municipality in the district of Dithmarschen, in Schleswig-Holstein, Germany.
