= Krempel (surname) =

Krempel is a surname. Notable people with the surname include:

- Erich Krempel (1913–1992), German sport shooter
- Fritz Krempel (1905–1984), German sports shooter
- John Krempel (1861–1933), German-born American architect
- Paul Krempel (1900–1973), American gymnast
