= Karolinenkoog =

- Municipality
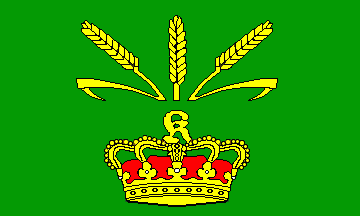
- Flag Coat of arms

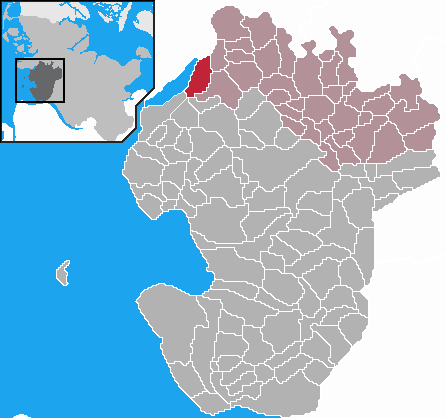
- Location of Karolinenkoog within Dithmarschen district
- Interactive map of Karolinenkoog
- Location within Germany Location within Schleswig-Holstein
- Coordinates: 54°16′N 8°58′E
- Country: Germany
- State: Schleswig-Holstein
- District: Dithmarschen
- Municipal assoc.: Eider

Government
  - Mayor: Rainer Schmidt-Wiborg

Area
  - Total: 17.55 km^{2} (6.78 sq mi)
- Elevation: 0 m (0 ft)

Population (2025-12-31)
  - Total: 155
  - Density: 8.83/km^{2} (22.9/sq mi)
- Time zone: UTC+01:00 (CET)
  - Summer (DST): UTC+02:00 (CEST)
- Postal codes: 25774
- Dialling codes: 04882
- Vehicle registration: HEI
- Website: www.amt-eider.de

Karolinenkoog (German pronunciation: [kaʁoˈliːnənˌkoːk], lit. 'Caroline's Koog') is a municipality in the district of Dithmarschen, in Schleswig-Holstein, Germany.

In 1800 the municipality was named after the Koog (polder), which was named in honour of Princess Caroline of Denmark.
