= Welmbüttel =

- Municipality
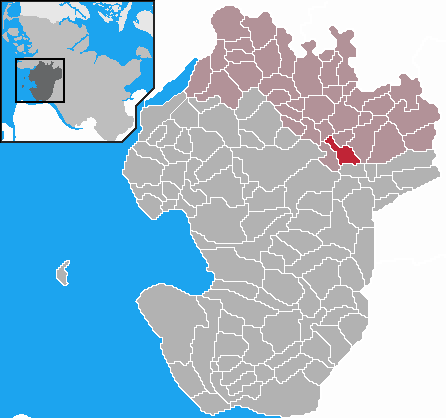
- Location of Welmbüttel within Dithmarschen district
- Interactive map of Welmbüttel
- Location within Germany Location within Schleswig-Holstein
- Coordinates: 54°11′48″N 9°14′54″E
- Country: Germany
- State: Schleswig-Holstein
- District: Dithmarschen
- Municipal assoc.: Eider

Government
  - Mayor: Karin Wrage

Area
  - Total: 7.6 km^{2} (2.9 sq mi)
- Elevation: 70 m (230 ft)

Population (2025-12-31)
  - Total: 394
  - Density: 52/km^{2} (130/sq mi)
- Time zone: UTC+01:00 (CET)
  - Summer (DST): UTC+02:00 (CEST)
- Postal codes: 25782
- Dialling codes: 04838
- Vehicle registration: HEI
- Website: welmbuettel.blogspot.de

Welmbüttel (German pronunciation: [ˈvɛlmbʏtl̩]) is a municipality in the district of Dithmarschen, in Schleswig-Holstein, Germany.
