= Barkenholm =

- Municipality
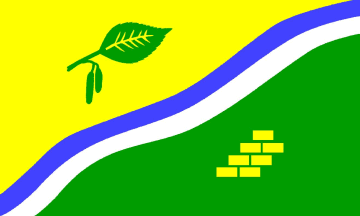
- Flag Coat of arms

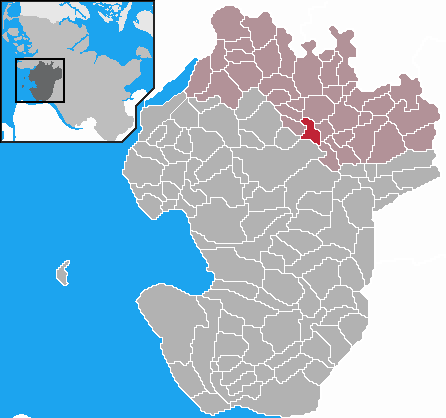
- Location of Barkenholm within Dithmarschen district
- Interactive map of Barkenholm
- Location within Germany Location within Schleswig-Holstein
- Coordinates: 54°14′N 09°11′E
- Country: Germany
- State: Schleswig-Holstein
- District: Dithmarschen
- Municipal assoc.: Eider

Government
  - Mayor: Hans-Werner Urbrock

Area
  - Total: 5.11 km^{2} (1.97 sq mi)
- Elevation: 9 m (30 ft)

Population (2025-12-31)
  - Total: 169
  - Density: 33.1/km^{2} (85.7/sq mi)
- Time zone: UTC+01:00 (CET)
  - Summer (DST): UTC+02:00 (CEST)
- Postal codes: 25791
- Dialling codes: 04836
- Vehicle registration: HEI
- Website: www.amt-eider.de

Barkenholm is a municipality in the district of Dithmarschen, in Schleswig-Holstein, Germany.
