= Lehe, Schleswig-Holstein =

Lehe
- Municipality
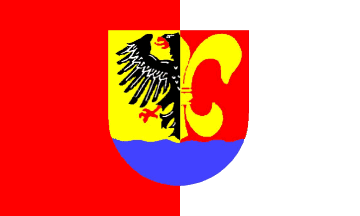
- Flag Coat of arms

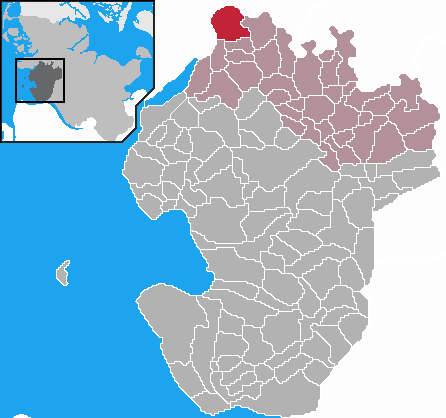
- Location of Lehe within Dithmarschen district
- Interactive map of Lehe
- Location within Germany Location within Schleswig-Holstein
- Coordinates: 54°20′16″N 9°1′24″E
- Country: Germany
- State: Schleswig-Holstein
- District: Dithmarschen
- Municipal assoc.: Eider
- Subdivisions: 5

Government
  - Mayor: Johannes Geiger

Area
  - Total: 18.63 km^{2} (7.19 sq mi)
- Elevation: 9 m (30 ft)

Population (2025-12-31)
  - Total: 1,084
  - Density: 58.19/km^{2} (150.7/sq mi)
- Time zone: UTC+01:00 (CET)
  - Summer (DST): UTC+02:00 (CEST)
- Postal codes: 25774
- Dialling codes: 04882
- Vehicle registration: HEI
- Website: www.amt-eider.de

Lehe (German pronunciation: [ˈleːə]) is a municipality in the district of Dithmarschen, in Schleswig-Holstein, Germany.
