= Hövede =

- Municipality
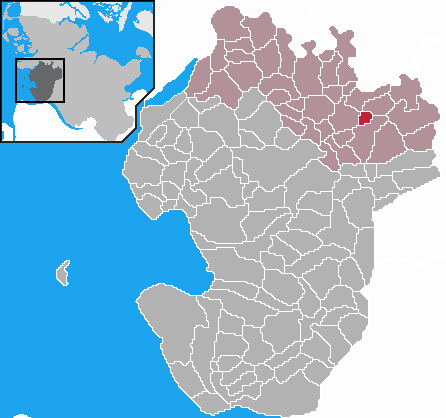
- Location of Hövede within Dithmarschen district
- Interactive map of Hövede
- Location within Germany Location within Schleswig-Holstein
- Coordinates: 54°15′N 9°18′E
- Country: Germany
- State: Schleswig-Holstein
- District: Dithmarschen
- Municipal assoc.: Eider

Government
  - Mayor: Uwe Harbeck

Area
  - Total: 2.94 km^{2} (1.14 sq mi)
- Elevation: 4 m (13 ft)

Population (2025-12-31)
  - Total: 51
  - Density: 17/km^{2} (45/sq mi)
- Time zone: UTC+01:00 (CET)
  - Summer (DST): UTC+02:00 (CEST)
- Postal codes: 25782
- Dialling codes: 04838
- Vehicle registration: HEI
- Website: www.amt-eider.de

Hövede is a municipality in the district of Dithmarschen, in Schleswig-Holstein, Germany.
