= Hennstedt, Dithmarschen =

Hennstedt
- Municipality
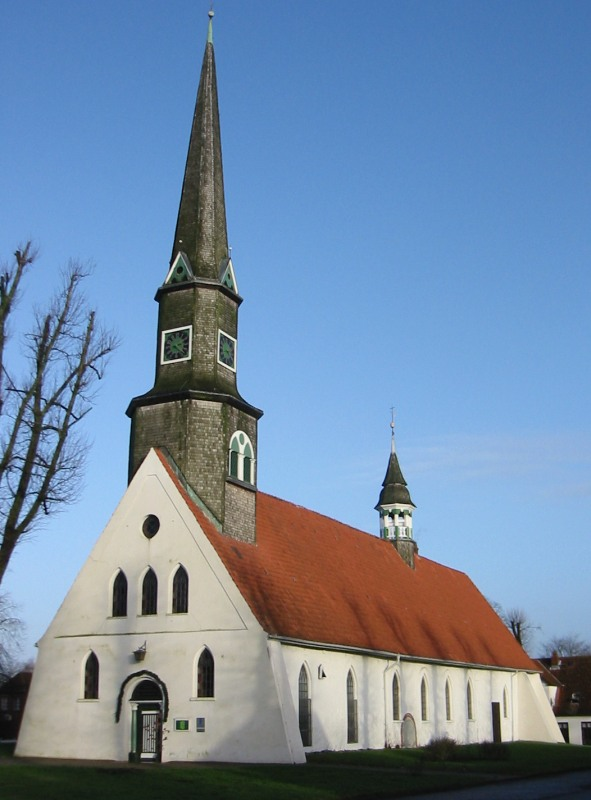
- St. Secundus

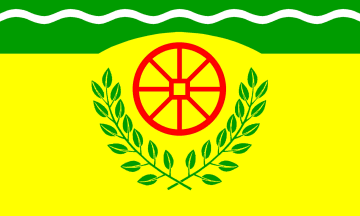
- Flag Coat of arms

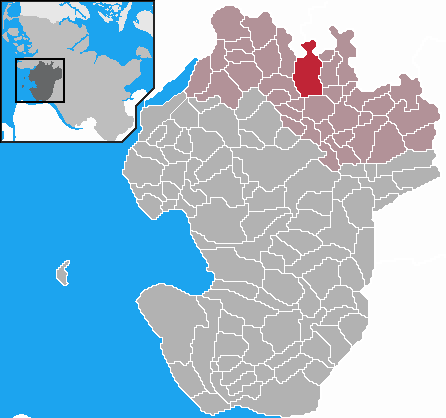
- Location of Hennstedt within Dithmarschen district
- Interactive map of Hennstedt
- Location within Germany Location within Schleswig-Holstein
- Coordinates: 54°16′N 09°10′E
- Country: Germany
- State: Schleswig-Holstein
- District: Dithmarschen
- Municipal assoc.: Eider
- Subdivisions: 10

Government
  - Mayor: Anne Riecke (FDP)

Area
  - Total: 21.93 km^{2} (8.47 sq mi)
- Elevation: 15 m (49 ft)

Population (2025-12-31)
  - Total: 2,037
  - Density: 92.89/km^{2} (240.6/sq mi)
- Time zone: UTC+01:00 (CET)
  - Summer (DST): UTC+02:00 (CEST)
- Postal codes: 25779
- Dialling codes: 04836
- Vehicle registration: HEI
- Website: www.amt-eider.de

Hennstedt (German pronunciation: [ˈhɛnʃtɛt]) is a municipality in the district of Dithmarschen, in Schleswig-Holstein, Germany. It is situated approximately 10 km northeast of Heide. Hennstedt is the seat of the Amt Kirchspielslandgemeinde ("collective municipality") Eider.

== People ==
- Wilhelm Wieben (1935-2019), German journalist
