= Tielenhemme =

- Municipality
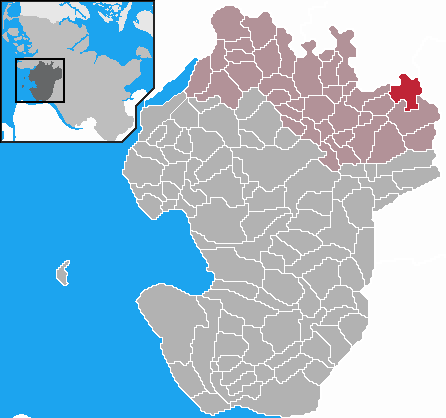
- Location of Tielenhemme within Dithmarschen district
- Interactive map of Tielenhemme
- Location within Germany Location within Schleswig-Holstein
- Coordinates: 54°16′N 09°22′E
- Country: Germany
- State: Schleswig-Holstein
- District: Dithmarschen
- Municipal assoc.: Eider
- Subdivisions: 3

Government
  - Mayor: Günter Jargsdorf

Area
  - Total: 12.7 km^{2} (4.9 sq mi)
- Elevation: 2 m (6.6 ft)

Population (2025-12-31)
  - Total: 159
  - Density: 12.5/km^{2} (32.4/sq mi)
- Time zone: UTC+01:00 (CET)
  - Summer (DST): UTC+02:00 (CEST)
- Postal codes: 25794
- Dialling codes: 04803
- Vehicle registration: HEI
- Website: www.amt-eider.de

Tielenhemme is a municipality in the district of Dithmarschen, in Schleswig-Holstein, Germany.
