= Süderheistedt =

- Municipality
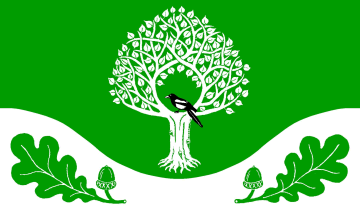
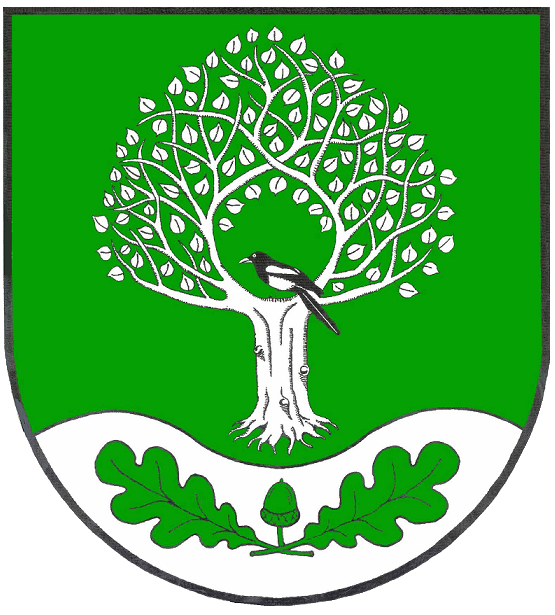
- Flag Coat of arms

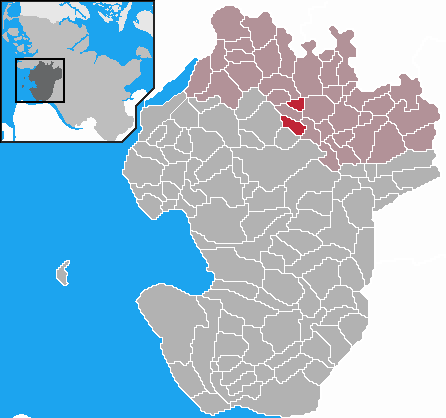
- Location of Süderheistedt within Dithmarschen district
- Interactive map of Süderheistedt
- Location within Germany Location within Schleswig-Holstein
- Coordinates: 54°7′N 9°13′E
- Country: Germany
- State: Schleswig-Holstein
- District: Dithmarschen
- Municipal assoc.: Eider

Government
  - Mayor: Birgit Meier

Area
  - Total: 8.44 km^{2} (3.26 sq mi)
- Elevation: 5 m (16 ft)

Population (2025-12-31)
  - Total: 542
  - Density: 64.2/km^{2} (166/sq mi)
- Time zone: UTC+01:00 (CET)
  - Summer (DST): UTC+02:00 (CEST)
- Postal codes: 25779
- Dialling codes: 0481
- Vehicle registration: HEI
- Website: www.suederheistedt.de

Süderheistedt is a municipality in the district of Dithmarschen, in Schleswig-Holstein, Germany.
