= Schalkholz =

- Municipality
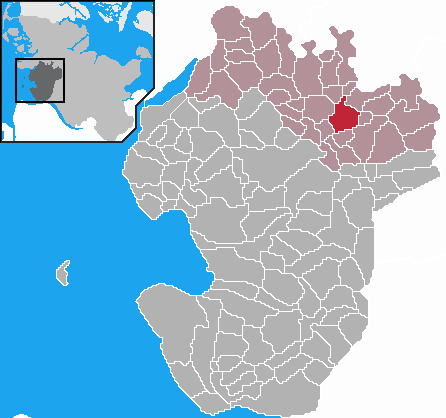
- Location of Schalkholz within Dithmarschen district
- Interactive map of Schalkholz
- Location within Germany Location within Schleswig-Holstein
- Coordinates: 54°15′N 9°15′E
- Country: Germany
- State: Schleswig-Holstein
- District: Dithmarschen
- Municipal assoc.: Eider

Government
  - Mayor: Erwin Grap

Area
  - Total: 12.5 km^{2} (4.8 sq mi)
- Elevation: 17 m (56 ft)

Population (2025-12-31)
  - Total: 565
  - Density: 45.2/km^{2} (117/sq mi)
- Time zone: UTC+01:00 (CET)
  - Summer (DST): UTC+02:00 (CEST)
- Postal codes: 25782
- Dialling codes: 04838
- Vehicle registration: HEI
- Website: www.amt-eider.de

Schalkholz is a municipality in the district of Dithmarschen, in Schleswig-Holstein, Germany.

== History ==
- Schalkholz Passage Grave
