= Dörpling =

- Municipality
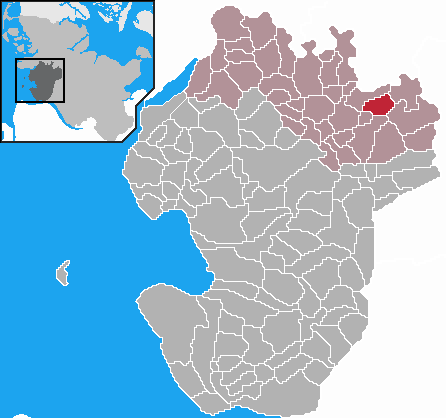
- Location of Dörpling within Dithmarschen district
- Interactive map of Dörpling
- Location within Germany Location within Schleswig-Holstein
- Coordinates: 54°16′N 09°18′E
- Country: Germany
- State: Schleswig-Holstein
- District: Dithmarschen
- Municipal assoc.: Eider

Government
  - Mayor: Volker Lorenzen

Area
  - Total: 7.82 km^{2} (3.02 sq mi)
- Elevation: 17 m (56 ft)

Population (2025-12-31)
  - Total: 632
  - Density: 80.8/km^{2} (209/sq mi)
- Time zone: UTC+01:00 (CET)
  - Summer (DST): UTC+02:00 (CEST)
- Postal codes: 25794
- Dialling codes: 04803
- Vehicle registration: HEI
- Website: www.amt-eider.de

Dörpling (German pronunciation: [ˈdœʁplɪŋ]), a municipality in the district of Dithmarschen in Schleswig-Holstein, Germany, was first mentioned in a document in 1320. Located 17 km north-east of Heide and 4 km east of Tellingstedt upon Eider, it has blurred boundaries with Pahlen. The ancient water mill - destroyed at the end of the 19th century - is said to have inspired a tale of writer Klaus Groth.
