= Wallen, Germany =

Wallen
- Municipality
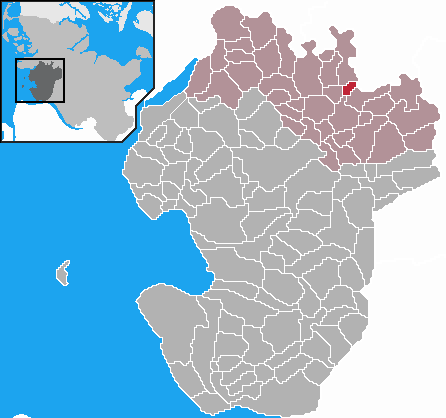
- Location of Wallen within Dithmarschen district
- Interactive map of Wallen
- Location within Germany Location within Schleswig-Holstein
- Coordinates: 54°17′8″N 9°16′5″E
- Country: Germany
- State: Schleswig-Holstein
- District: Dithmarschen
- Municipal assoc.: Eider

Government
  - Mayor: Johann Klaussen Thomsen

Area
  - Total: 1.86 km^{2} (0.72 sq mi)
- Elevation: 1 m (3.3 ft)

Population (2025-12-31)
  - Total: 28
  - Density: 15/km^{2} (39/sq mi)
- Time zone: UTC+01:00 (CET)
  - Summer (DST): UTC+02:00 (CEST)
- Postal codes: 25788
- Dialling codes: 04803
- Vehicle registration: HEI
- Website: www.amt-eider.de

Wallen (German pronunciation: [ˈvalən]) is a municipality in the district of Dithmarschen, in Schleswig-Holstein, Germany.
