= German Reunification Transport Projects =

Projects since 1990

Map of the German Unification Transport Projects

The German Reunification Transport Projects or German Unity Transport Projects (German: Verkehrsprojekte Deutsche Einheit), commonly known by their German initials VDE, are a set of major construction projects to increase and improve transport links between Eastern and Western Germany after German reunification. These projects are planned to positively impact regional development and infrastructure in the new federal states and across the inner German border.

== Background ==
Until the 1970s, East Germany (officially the German Democratic Republic or GDR) had not made any large-scale investment into its transport infrastructure. Many of its motorways, roads, and railways had not been upgraded since the 1940s (with the exception of some that were repaired in the 1950s as needed) and were largely neglected: trunk roads, East Germany's long-distance counterparts to West Germany's Bundesstraßen, were still mostly unpaved in rural areas in 1990 and had numerous potholes.

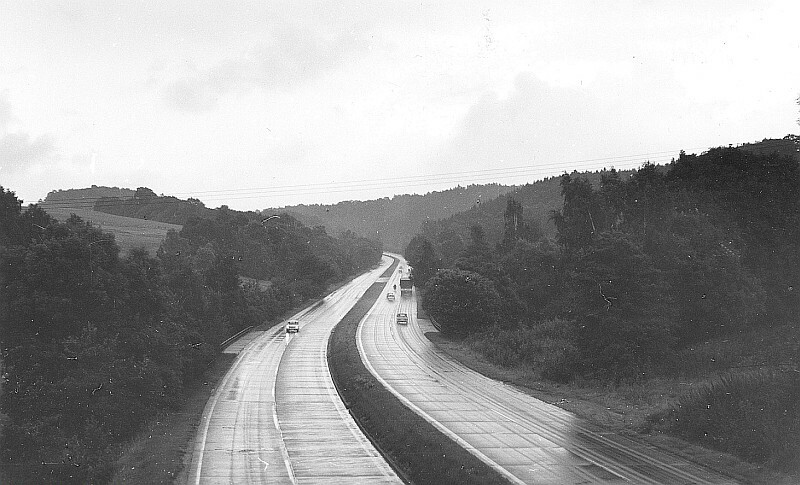
Autobahn in the GDR (1981)

The motorways were, essentially, the same as they were before World War II. Exceptions included the six-lane expansion of a short section of the southern segment of the Berlin ring road and the largest section of the A 24 from Hamburg to Berlin, at a cost of 1.2 billion East German mark (around 1.1 billion euro), which West Germany funded. In contrast, the GDR hardly invested in the Nazi-era Reichsautobahn network. By 1990, most of the motorways had deteriorated significantly and did not have shoulders. There was a lack of accelerating and decelerating ramps at interchanges, and there was also no continuous protective guardrail on long stretches. Routes to West Germany had been brought up to better standards over the years, but had also been in the shadows for decades.

The railroads were the most important means of transport in the east - the Reichsbahn carried more goods on a network that was half as long as the West German Bundesbahn - but that did not save them from the effects of the historically poor East German economy. The replacement and repairing of sleepers, switches, and drain pipes was continually delayed. To make matters worse, faulty concrete mixes had been installed in sleepers for many years, and they became unusable much earlier than planned due to "concrete cancer". In addition, many lines had second and third tracksets dismantled by the Soviet Union as a form of reparations in the 1940s, and these tracks were only rebuilt on a few main lines. In addition, all rail electrification infrastructure was removed, and was only replaced hesitantly, especially in the 1970s. Despite great efforts in the 1980s, electrification was still not at the level of the West. Although the usage of steam locomotives was officially phased out in 1987, the lack of diesel counterparts meant that "Plandampf" (scheduled steam) was a common practice. Slowness was the norm - in fact, trains in the GDR often took more time to travel the same route in 1989 than they did in the 1930s. For example, the Fliegender Hamburger express train on the Berlin–Hamburg Railway took 138 minutes to travel between those two cities in 1933, but typically took 243 minutes on the same route by 1989 (for comparison, in 2025, the corresponding travel time is 105 minutes).

With the fall of the wall and the opening of the borders in Europe, west–east traffic grew and added the then-dominant north–south transport corridors on a massive scale, especially in Germany and other countries on the former Iron Curtain. The north–south direction (Rheinschiene and Hamburg – Stuttgart / Munich) still dominates in western Germany, but since 1989 the importance of the historical west–east axes and the north–south connection between Bavaria and Thuringia / Saxony has increased. An explosion in demand broke out over the GDR transport network, which had been neglected for decades. The number of traffic fatalities rose substantially. While this affected all road types, it was recognized that a number of dangerous areas had developed on federal highways and roads running east to west that were previously sparsely travelled. Alongside the expansion of existing roads, it was also clear that the transport network between the East and the bordering states of Schleswig-Holstein, Lower Saxony, Hesse and Bavaria would need to be consolidated.

== History ==
On January 9, 1990, the constituent meeting of the German-German Transport Infrastructure Commission East Berlin dealing with cross-border transport connections and medium and long-term traffic route planning in road and air transport. On October 3, 1990, the reunification of Germany took place.

In January 1991, Günther Krause took over the position of Federal Minister of Transport and initiated an inventory of the traffic situation in the new federal states. This was the founding moment for the plans of the German Unification Transport Projects. On April 9, 1991, the Federal Minister of Transport presented the cabinet with the VDE program, which decided on this in anticipation of the 1992 Federal Transport Infrastructure Plan. The VDE projects are shown separately in this plan. The projects found their way into him without re-evaluation

In order to realize all projects within a decade if possible, two private law project companies were founded outside of the previous authority structures: Deutsche Einheit Fernstraßenplanungs- und -bau GmbH (DEGES) and Planungsgesellschaft Bahnbau Deutsche Einheit (PBDE). Krause expected the completion of all VDE projects by the year 2000.

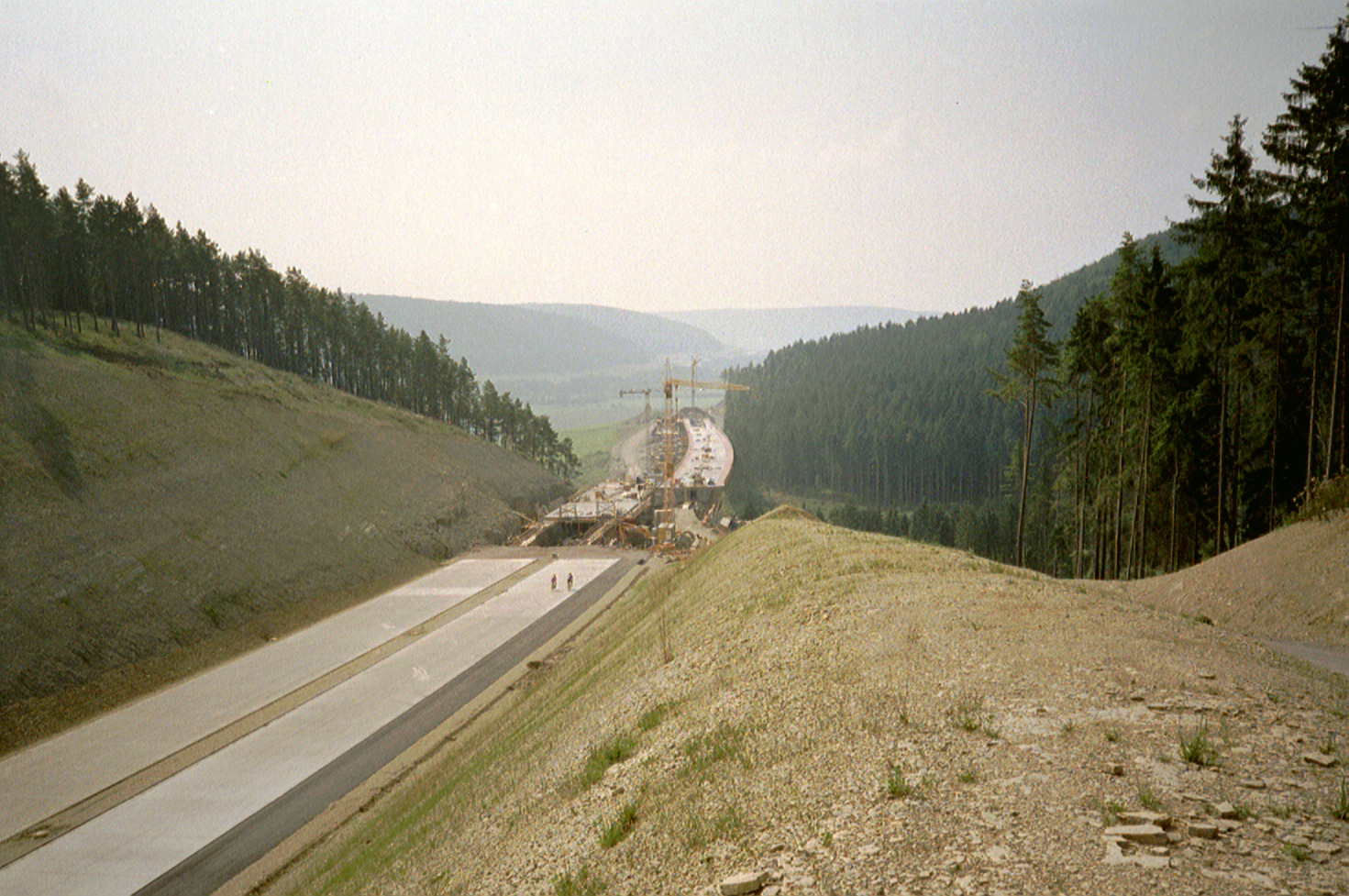
Construction of VDE 16, the Thüringer-Wald-Autobahn A 71 (Erfurt–Schweinfurt), 2002

In January 1992 the information campaign Neue Wege braucht das Land. Jetzt! was launched to promote the VDE to citizens in the new federal states.

By the end of 1994, around ten billion DM (5.1 billion euros) had been invested in the VDE projects. In December 1991 the Traffic Planning Acceleration Act came into force to accelerate the planning of the VDE projects. On December 1, 1993, the first of several investment measure laws followed, which were to replace plan approval procedures in sections of the VDE projects..

The cost of the VDE projects in 1991 was estimated at 56 billion Deutsche Mark (28.6 billion euros). Of this, DM 32 billion was accounted for the nine rail transport projects. Because of the development of prices it was raised to 64 billion DM (32.7 billion euros) until 1993. By 1995, DM 12.4 billion had been invested. Three of the 17 projects were completed by early 1996. The estimated total investment around that time was estimated at DM 67.5 billion. Of the 1200 km of planned motorways, around 800 km were in the planning approval process or already provided with building rights. 140 km were already under construction.

The estimated total cost is €39.4 billion. By the end of 2011, almost €32 billion of this had been spent, rising to 33.9 billion in 2012. Around 16.2 billion euros of this was attributable to railways, 15.1 billion euros to roads and around 1.6 billion euros to waterways. By the end of 2013, around 34 billion euros had been spent.

== VDE projects ==
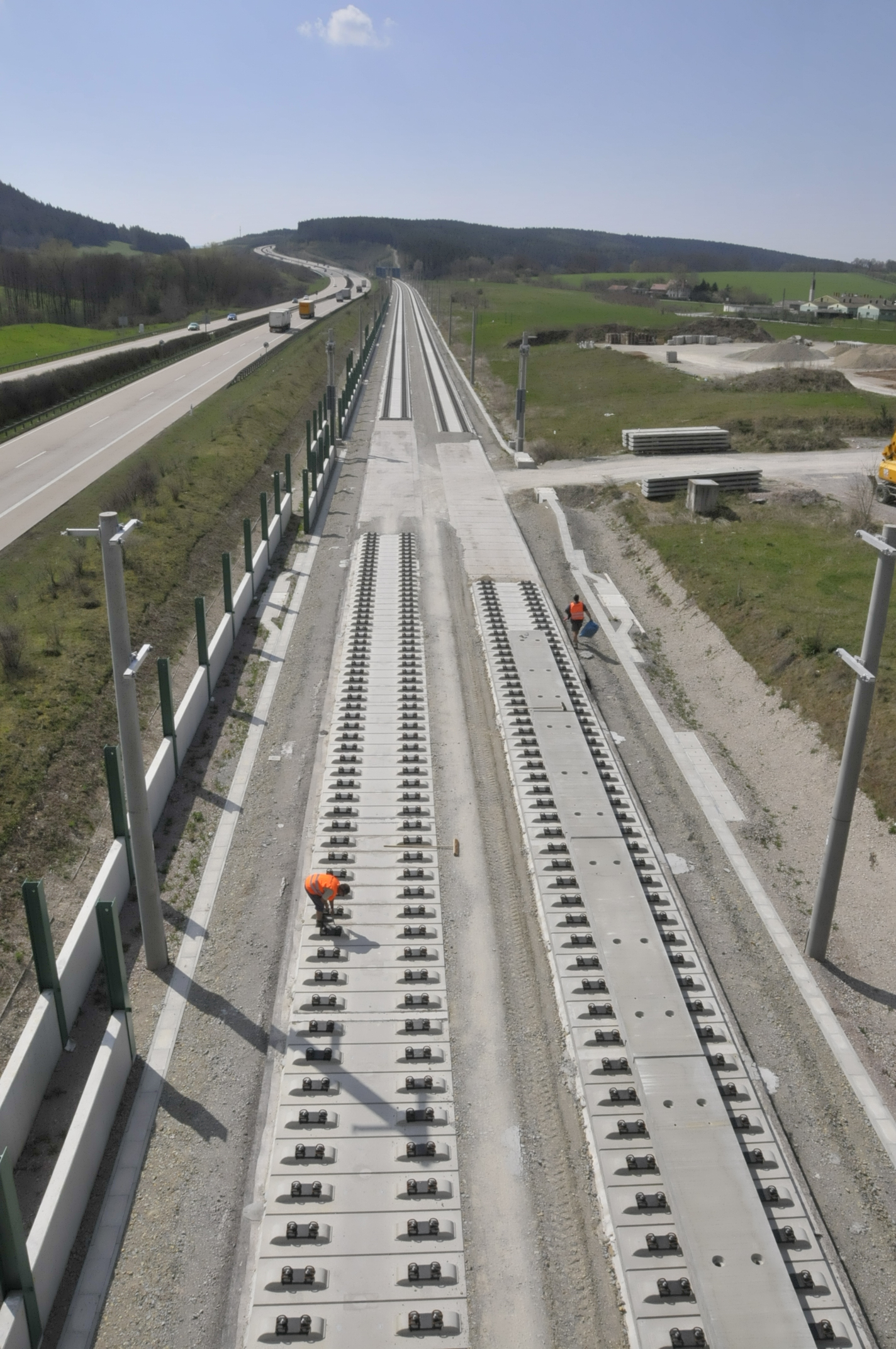
Two projects in 2013: VDE 8: Nuremberg–Erfurt high-speed railway (then under construction) and VDE 16 A 71 Erfurt–Schweinfurt (completed)

There are 17 VDE projects, all either finished or under construction, numbered from north to south in ascending order. They consist of nine rail projects, six motorway/Autobahn projects, and a waterway.

=== Rail ===
Out of the rail projects, six have been completed (VDE 2 through 7) and work on projects 8 and 9 is ongoing. Two planned sections of the VDE 1 project will not be worked on due to a lack of cost-effectiveness (as of 2014).

By the end of 2011, out of an estimated total cost of 20.1 billion euros, 15.4 billion euros "worth" of infrastructure had been installed. In two years, those figures had increased to 20.3 and 16.9 billion euros, respectively.

- VDE 1: Lübeck/Hagenow Land–Rostock–Stralsund (foundation stone laid February 6, 1993, originally planned to start construction in 1997, then 2002; currently incomplete). The 242 km long axis is to be expanded to two tracks and equipped for speeds of up to 160 km/h. A review of the plans on November 11, 2010 determined it was not economically viable to double track the Rostock (branch Riekdahl) – Ribnitz-Damgarten West and Velgast – Stralsund segments; thus, these parts of the project are currently not being pursued.
- VDE 2: By 1997, the Berlin–Hamburg railway was fully renovated, electrified and expanded for trains to operate at 160 km/h. As a result, journey times were reduced to two hours and 17 minutes. As the Transrapid project between the two cities was cancelled, the line was upgraded in 2000 for speeds of 200 km/h. This means that the journey time has been reduced to 90 minutes since December 2004.
- VDE 3: New construction and expansion of the gap closure of the Stendal–Uelzen railway between Uelzen and Salzwedel (completion in December 1999); the continuous double-track expansion should take place in a later expansion stage.
- VDE 4: Extension of the Stammstrecke (subsequently greatly reduced) and construction of the Hanover–Berlin high-speed railway via Stendal (completed in 1998). Plans to expand this route were already part of bilateral talks between East and West during the 1980s.
- VDE 5: Upgrading the Helmstedt–Magdeburg–Berlin line for speeds up to 160 km/h (completed in 1995, see also Brunswick–Magdeburg railway).
- VDE 6: Closing the gap and expanding the Halle–Hann. Münden railway between Eichenberg and Halle (Saale) (completed 1994).
- VDE 7: Extension of the Bebra–Erfurt Railway (completed 1995); the Erfurt-Bischleben – Erfurt Hbf section was converted for VDE No. 8.1 and finished December 2017.
- VDE 8: High-speed connection from Berlin via Halle, Leipzig and Erfurt to Nuremberg. The project is divided into three sections:
  - VDE 8.1 – Nuremberg–Erfurt high-speed railway: The new Erfurt-Ebensfeld section was put into operation in December 2017. The subsequent expansion section to Nuremberg, construction will continue for a few years (as of June 2017). A four-track expansion of the sections between Nuremberg and Ebensfeld as well as a 13 km long new line for freight traffic is also planned. The estimated total cost is 5.1 billion euros. The final date of completion is unknown.
  - VDE 8.2 – Erfurt–Leipzig/Halle high-speed railway: The 23 km long section between Gröbers and Leipzig has been in operation since 2003, the rest was opened in December 2015. The estimated total cost is 2.7 billion euros.
  - VDE 8.3 Expanded Berlin–Leipzig/Halle railway: Commissioned and fully opened on May 28, 2006 with the completion of Berlin Hauptbahnhof. The total cost is 1.65 billion euros.
- VDE 9: Expansion of the Leipzig–Dresden railway. Started in 1993. The completion of the project is not foreseeable (as of 2016)..

As the first project in the series to be completed, VDE 6 was inaugurated on May 27, 1994. Project 7 followed in May 1995 and project 5 at the end of 1995. The rail transport projects were largely supervised by the Planungsgesellschaft Bahnbau Deutsche Einheit at first, which was merged into DB Projekt Verkehrsbau in 2000 and finally into DB ProjektBau in 2002.

Alongside the projects, new traction power lines were built, such as the 162 km line from Muldenstein through the Kirchmöser power plant to Rathenow. On March 27, 1995, a new gas and steam combined cycle power plant started operation in Kirchmöser.

=== Motorways ===
A total of seven road construction projects worth 17.3 billion euros are planned or under construction. By the end of 2011, 14.9 billion euros had been invested. By the end of 2013, 15.4 out of an estimated 17.4 billion euros had been invested. Four of the projects (10, 12, 14, 16) have been built, and the other three, projects 11, 13 and 15 have largely been completed. By the end of 2013, more than 1,895 km of new and expanded motorways had been created.

The projects are supervised in the new federal states by DEGES.

- VDE 10: Construction of the Baltic Sea Autobahn A 20 between Lübeck and Szczecin (Kreuz Uckermark) via Rostock (completed in 2005).
- VDE 11: Expansion of Autobahn A 2 between Hanover and Berlin (completed in 2001) as well as of A 10 Ost- and Süd- Berliner Ring. The eight-lane extension between the A 9 and the A 115 has been completed in June 2020.
- VDE 12: Six-lane expansion of Autobahn A 9 between Berlin and Nürnberg (completed November 2014).
- VDE 13: Construction of the Südharzautobahn A 38 between Göttingen and Halle (Saale) (completed in 2009) and A 143 Halle West Bypass (2 sections completed 2003 and 2004, last section under construction since 2019, completion expected in 2025).
- VDE 14: Construction of Autobahn A 14 between Magdeburg and Halle (completed in 2000).
- VDE 15: Construction of Autobahn A 44 between Kassel and Eisenach (mostly finished); extension of Autobahn A 4 between Eisenach and Bautzen (except for the Hermsdorfer Kreuz extension completed in 2014) and construction of A 4 between Bautzen and Görlitz (completed in 1999).
- VDE 16: New construction of the Thuringian Forest Autobahn A 71 between Schweinfurt and Erfurt (completed in 2005) and the A 73 from Suhl to Lichtenfels (completed in 2008).

=== Waterways ===
- VDE 17, the only water transport project, involves a "federal waterway" with a route of Rühen – Magdeburg – Berlin. This involved the construction of the Magdeburg waterway crossing, as well as the expansion of the Untere-Havel waterway and the Mittelland Canal, including the Elbe-Havel Canal. It also involved construction of the Charlottenburg lock, the straightening of a section of the Spree and the expansion of the Westhafen Canal to Berliner Westhafen (aka "Nordtrasse") Originally, the Teltow Canal and the Kleinmachnow lock were also to be extended to Berliner Osthafen ("Südtrasse"). The planned investment into the project is 2.04 billion euros, of which 1.65 billion euros were spent by the end of 2013.

The section of the Mittelland Canal from Magdeburg to the Dortmund-Ems Canal is to be navigable from the end of 2016 with 185 m long and 2.80 m unloaded pushing units with 3600 t load. VDE 17 is scheduled for completion in 2019.

This project is controversial among environmental groups and residents. According to the 1992 Federal Transport Infrastructure Plan, the extension to 280 kilometers of waterways should have a water depth of four meters and a width of 42 to 77 meters in curves. Critics claim that this endangers the Havel river landscape and the cultural heritage of Berlin and Potsdam.

With the abandonment of the Osthafen by Berlin, the Südtrasse was spun off from the VDE 17. The Nordtrasse is now to be expanded to a lesser extent than originally planned. The goal is to ensure a limited expansion to avoid collisions between groups of pusher boats.

By the end of 2013, 1.6 billion of around 2.0 billion euros had been invested in the project.

For the Berlin-Spandau area, the scope of expansion was reduced from the original plans. Here, the Spree-Oder waterway from km 0 to km 4.673 (Rohrdamm) (Höhe Rohrdamm) and the Lower Havel waterway from km 0 to km 4.3 from 2018 will be deepened and corrected in some places, such as the Spandauer Horn. Instead of the originally planned four meters, the fairway is now lowered to 3.50 meters, and the number of trees affected by felling is reduced from around a thousand to 90. The expected construction time is given as three years.

== See also ==
- Tiefwerder Wiesen
