= Tiefwerder =

Location and Werder of the Havel in the Berlin district of Spandau

Coordinates: 52°30′59″N 13°12′27″E

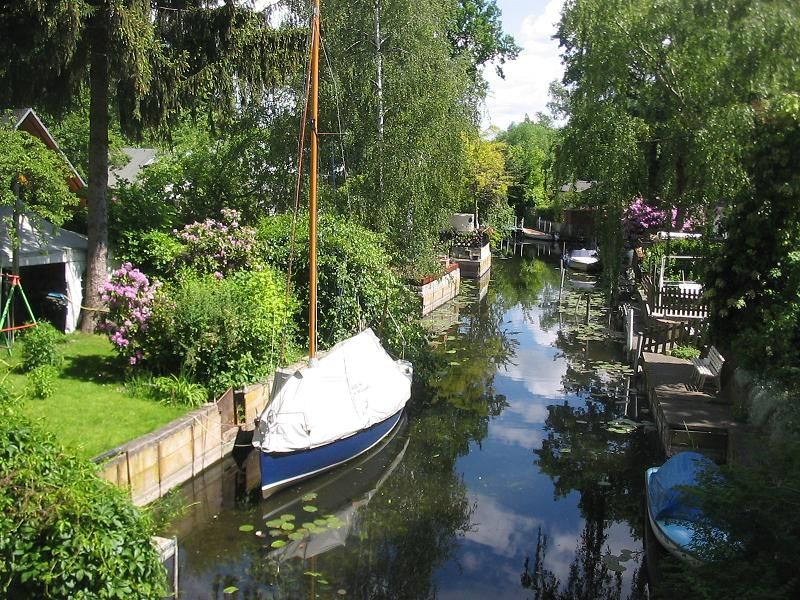
Small Jürgengraben at the end of the village street

Tiefwerder encompasses both a village and a Werder along the Havel River in the Berlin district of Spandau. While the village of Tiefwerder, along with the neighboring southern port of Spandau, falls under the jurisdiction of the district of Spandau, the surrounding forested areas, meadows, and water areas of the Werder are administratively part of the district of Wilhelmstadt.

An early Slavic settlement existed at Faulen See until the 13th century. The village of Tiefwerder was established as a colonist village in 1815. It was during this time that descendants of the Spandau Kietz fishermen were resettled on the Werder. Today, a significant portion of the historic houses lining the village street has been preserved and is recognized as the entire ensemble of the colonist settlement Tiefwerder. The building at Dorfstraße 5 from 1895, which has been home to the Ballhaus Spandau since the 1920s, is also a listed building. The Tiefwerder waterworks, built in 1914, supplied drinking water to six Berlin districts.

To the south and east, the village of Tiefwerder is bordered by the Tiefwerder Wiesen landscape conservation area. This area, intersected by ancient arms of the Havel River, is Berlin's last preserved natural floodplain and a spawning ground for pike. It has wet meadows, remnants of floodplain forests, and reed beds with natural land-water transitions. Due to the numerous watercourses and settlements along the ditches, Tiefwerder is also known as the "Little Venice of Spandau".

== Geography ==
=== Location and definition Tiefwerder ===
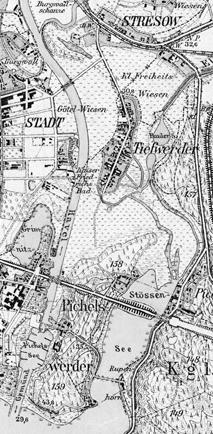
The map (around 1910) shows the former lowland area around the village. The Tiefwerder meadows that remain today lie between Tiefwerder and Pichelswerder

Tiefwerder originally began as a field name, with its earliest documented reference dating back to 1674/1675, noted as aufm Tiefwerder. The addition of 'Tief' to the field name 'Werder' served to distinguish it from the neighboring Pichelswerder to the south, which features an elevated eastern side as an extension of the Teltow plateau. This field name eventually became associated with the village founded in 1816.

The entirety of Tiefwerder stretches between the Havel River and the Havelchaussee, with somewhat unclear northern and southern boundaries. Tiefwerder, a part of Spandau, encompasses both the historic village center and its later buildings. This area lies between Spandau's Südhafen, an old Havel River arm created through river straightening, and the Kleinen and Großer Jürgengraben waterways. On occasion, the southern harbor of Spandau is considered part of the village. While the town originally extended northward to the Tiefwerderbrücke bridge, today, some areas further north, including those up to the Stresow, are occasionally included.

With the overall designation Tiefwerder, the lowland areas of the Werder belonging to Wilhelmstadt are added. These areas include the now-filled-in Freiheitswiesen (freedom meadows) to the northeast of the village, the region surrounding the Faulen See (lazy lake), and the island located south of the village between Tiefwerder and Pichelswerder, which is not represented on the accompanying map from 1894. Presently, this island serves as the last remaining floodplain and the heart of the Tiefwerder Wiesen landscape conservation area. A footbridge over the Kleiner Jürgengraben connects the central meadow area to the village.

=== Mapping as "Lebensweltlich orientierter Raum" (LOR) ===
In 2006, the planning departments of the Senate, the districts, and the Amtes für Statistik Berlin-Brandenburg (Berlin-Brandenburg Office of Statistics) agreed on the so-called "Lebensweltlich orientierte Räume" (LOR). These spaces were developed based on the social areas previously defined by the youth welfare department. The concept of LOR was officially adopted on 1 August 2006 through a Senate resolution, marking a new spatial framework for planning, forecasting, and monitoring demographic and social developments in Berlin. In their 2008 mapping efforts, the Office for Statistics took a comprehensive approach when defining the Tiefwerder living space (area 27 in Spandau). This broader definition encompassed not only the village and the Werder but also extended to the entire northern area, reaching up to the Ruhlebener Straße/Charlottenburger Chaussee street line within the Tiefwerder living space. The LOR concept serves as an innovative spatial framework, facilitating the planning, forecasting, and monitoring of demographic and social developments in Berlin.

This article describes Tiefwerder in the boundary of the LOR system excluding the northwest corner located between the Havel River and Ruhlebener Straße, since this corner belongs to the historical and present-day Stresow area. The northeast corner in the area of Elsgrabenweg/Ruhlebener Straße/Teltower Straße is included in this article, according to the LOR mapping, even though it was part of the historical estate district of Grunewald-Forst or, from 1914, of the estate district of Heerstraße in the district of Teltow, while Tiefwerder belonged to the district of Osthavelland. The inclusion of this area in the article is because it became part of Spandau in 1920 during the formation of Greater Berlin and currently falls administratively under the district of Wilhelmstadt. Therefore, this article outlines Tiefwerder within the following boundaries:

- Western border: Havel
- Northern boundary: Schoolenburgstraße /Charlottenburger Chaussee street
- Eastern boundary: S-Bahn wall of the Spandau suburban railway (largely parallel to Havelchaussee )
- Southern boundary: lowland area south of the Kleiner Jürgengraben.

In the east, the Spandauer Vorortbahn forms the boundary to the district of Charlottenburg-Wilmersdorf, while the historic town of Spandau is situated approximately 1.8 kilometers to the northwest. The central area of Tiefwerder, centered around the old village core, is primarily accessible from the north, with Dorfstraße being the sole street serving this region.

=== Geomorphology and natural environment ===
==== Tiefwerder Wiesen ====
The biotope and landscape function of the Tiefwerder Wiesen landscape conservation area, also known as the Hechtlaichwiesen, depends crucially on their flood dynamics. Changes like the reduction of Spree tributaries in Lusatia or the deepening of the Havel River have caused a decline in the Havel water level since 1990. This alteration has resulted in a significant deterioration of these dynamics, limiting access to spawning meadows for pike only in certain years. The future of flood dynamics is further jeopardized by the 'German Unity' transport project 17 (VDE No. 17), which is anticipated to further decrease water levels. If the project proceeds, the state of Berlin intends to mitigate this impact by artificially irrigating the Tiefwerder Wiesen with Havel water and constructing fish ladders as a compensatory measure. Since 2007, the state of Berlin has been exploring the possibility of extending the protected status to that of a nature reserve.

== History ==
=== Early Slavic settlement at Faulen See ===
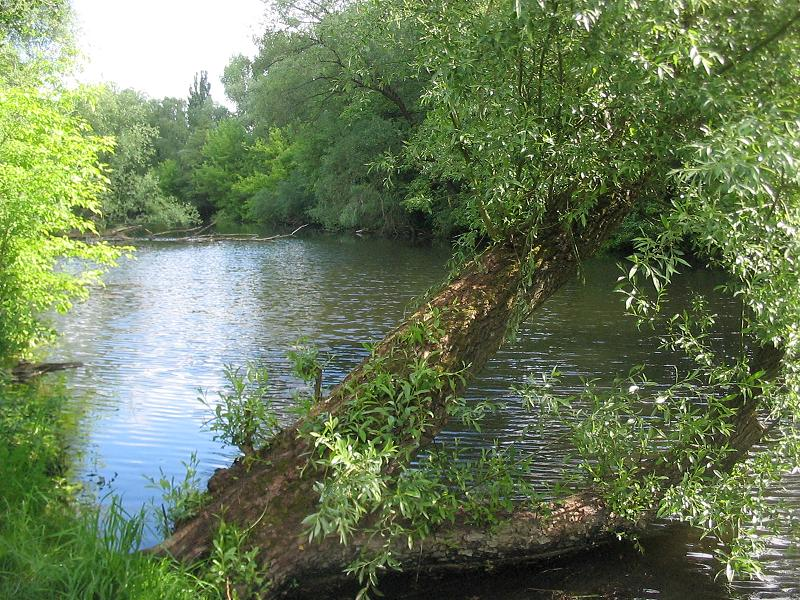
Havelarm Fauler See, formerly Wirchen-See

On the eastern shore of the silting-up Faulen See, a remnant of an old arm of the Havel River, there existed an early Slavic settlement until the first half of the 13th century. Archaeological findings from 1962, particularly vessel fragments of the Prague type identified by Adriaan von Müller, suggest a settlement dating back to the 6th to 8th centuries. If one prioritize the 6th-century dating, the village would have been established during the initial Slavic settlement wave into the Havelland, making it older than the central Slavic settlement chamber of the Spandau area on the Havel Island beneath the Burgwall.

The settlement was situated at the present location of the Tiefwerder waterworks. The Faule See was known as Wirchen-See until the 19th century, and Winfried Schich speculates that the lake's name is linked to the village name. Like the village Ferch near Potsdam, the name might be etymologically derived from the Slavic "verch/virch," meaning height or elevation, referring here to the neighboring Teltow slopes. As late as 1704, Spandau's hereditary register records Wirchow as a field name: "[...] biß hinter Pichelstorff a die Scharpelancke und Wirchow" (Scharpelancke = Scharfe Lanke). Likely, the same name is also concealed in Jürgengraben, which was still called Würgengraben in the 19th century.

=== Fishing village 1816 ===
==== Resettlement of the Spandau Kietzers to Tiefwerder ====
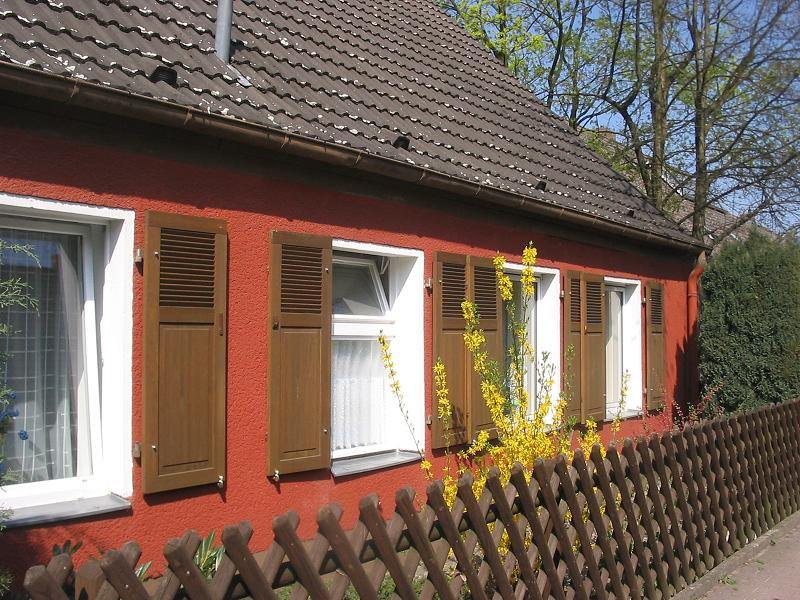
Listed colonist house from 1816 at Dorfstrasse 23

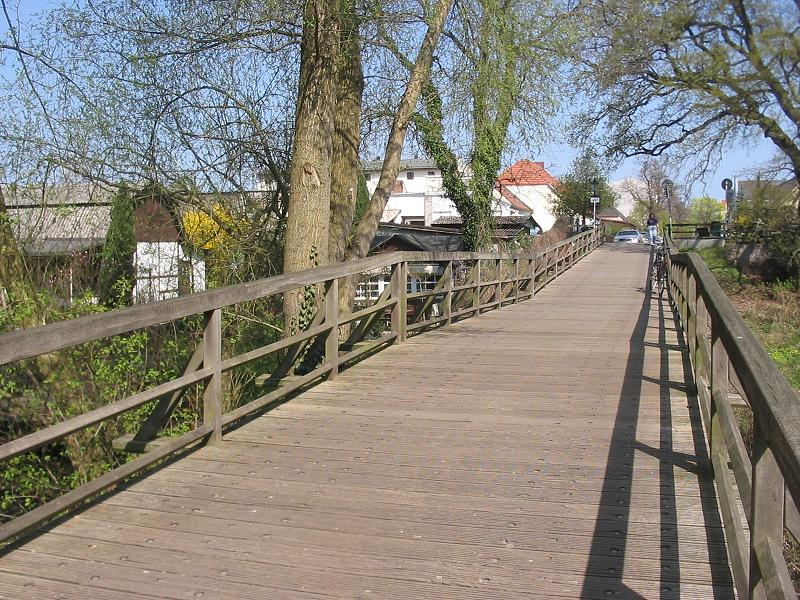
Pedestrian bridge over the Kleiner Jürgengraben in the village of Tiefwerder

After the founding of the Mark Brandenburg by the Ascanian Albrecht the Bear in 1157 and the medieval eastern settlement that began thereafter, the Slavic population of the Spandau area was largely assimilated by German immigrants. However, a service settlement near the Spandau castle remained occupied by Slavic Kietzers. The Wends uff dem Kytze doselbst vor Spanndow had 25 houses in 1375 and possessed extensive fishing rights on the Havel and the Spree, but no civil rights. Eight days a year they had to perform court service at the castle. During the expansion of the citadel, the Kietz was abandoned in 1559 and the Kietzers were relocated to the Burgwall. In 1813, during the siege of Spandau by Russian troops in the Wars of liberation, the French division general and governor Bruny had the suburbs cleared and burned down, including the dwellings of the descendants of the Kietzers on the Burgwall. The former Kietzers had to be resettled again and came to Tiefwerder as colonists (from the city of Spandau to Brandenburg). The evening edition of the Berliner Tageblatt reported somewhat differently on 3 March 1916, under the headline Hundertjahrfeier in Tiefwerder:

“Between 1560 and 1594, when the old castle was transformed into a citadel by Rochus zu Lynar, the Kietzers were forced to vacate their previous homes and were resettled on Pichelsdorfer Weg, across from the Burgwall, an ancient Wenden redoubt, separated from it by a navigable waterway. However, this 'new Kietz' was short-lived, as the old fishing community had to make way for the expansion of Prussia's Spandau fortifications in 1816. They were relocated once again, this time to Tiefwerder, a long and narrow island situated between the Havel and the Faulen See, north of Pichelswerder. After the 're-establishment' of the fishermen in this area was approved by the ministries on 2 November 1815, individual plots of land were allocated to them on 25 April 1816. The development of their new settlement occurred between 1818 and 1820 with government support.“

— Centenary celebrations in Tiefwerder, Berliner Tageblatt, 3 March 1916

The village of Tiefwerder was founded in the year 1816. For much of its history, the primary occupation of its residents remained predominantly fishing. In the 2000s, the Tiefwerder-Pichelsdorf Fishermen’s Association emerged as one of the most influential fishing organizations in the region, overseeing 1682 hectares of fishing waters in the state of Berlin and 3847 hectares in the state of Brandenburg.

=== Monuments on the Tiefwerder ===
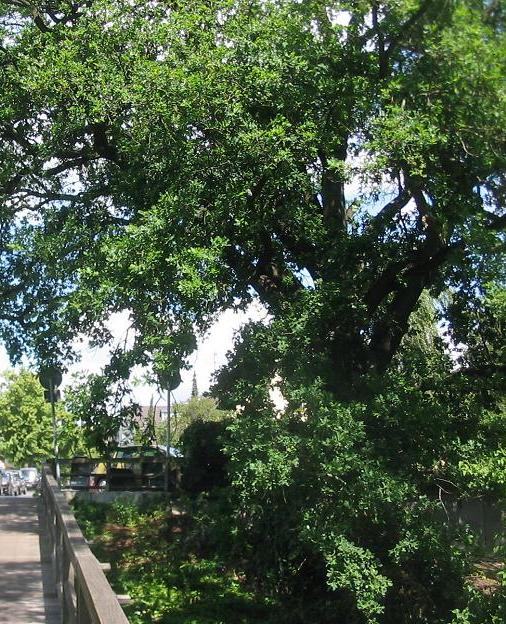
Natural monument English oak at the end of the village street

Fifteen colonist houses on Dorfstraße have been preserved and are listed as part of the entire ensemble known as Kolonistensiedlung Tiefwerder (settlement and village complex). A pedunculate oak (Quercus robur) located at the end of Dorfstraße, on the embankment of Kleiner Jürgengraben, has been designated as a natural monument. This approximately 200-year-old tree stands at a height of 15 to 20 meters, boasts a crown diameter of about 20 meters, and possesses a trunk circumference ranging from 2.50 to 3 meters.

Also of historical significance is the house at Dorfstraße 5, built around 1895 by master mason Karl Schüler. It soon gained popularity as a dance club and attracted visitors from various parts of Berlin, becoming known as the Ballhaus Spandau. Today, this discotheque holds the distinction of being one of the oldest continuously operating discotheques in the world, remaining at the same location without relocating. During the Nazi period, the NSDAP (National Socialist German Workers' Party) used the venue for conferences and events. Additional monuments in the Tiefwerder area include two tenement houses built by machine manufacturer Wilhelm Beeken at Teltower Straße 16-18 in 1914. Furthermore, a small remaining section of the Teltower Schanze (also known as Teltower Brück Schanze) located at the corner of Havelchaussee/Elsgrabenweg is designated as a listed monument (redoubt, ditch, hollow shelter, and fortification). This redoubt was built between 1855 and 1866 by the Prussian military administration on the former Elsgraben and formed part of the Stresow fortification. Like the Havel redoubt, it was a component of the ring of fortifications encircling the old town of Spandau and the citadel. Its military use ceased in 1903, giving rise to the name Schanzenwald.

=== South harbor and waterworks ===
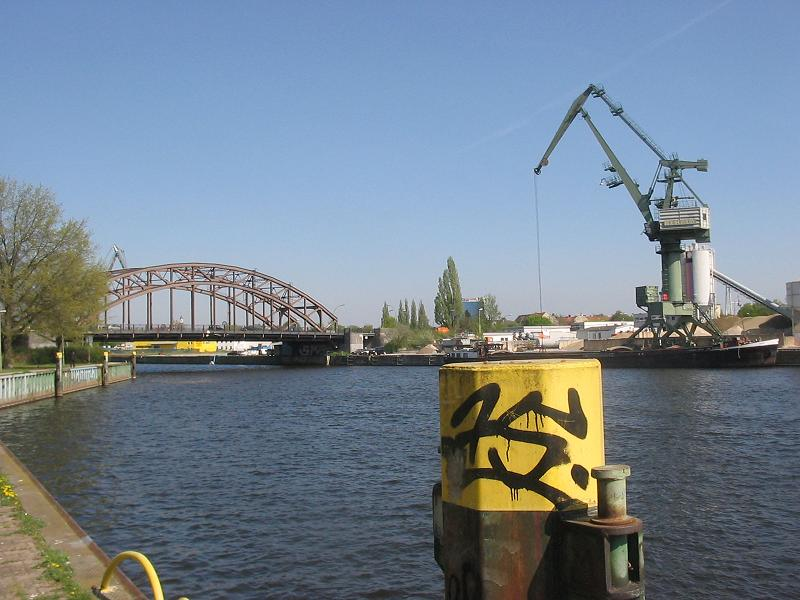
Spandau South Harbor, Havel, schulenburg bridge

In 1908, the city of Spandau undertook the expansion of the southern harbor at Tiefwerder. Simultaneously, they initiated a project to straighten the course of the Havel River, resulting in the creation of a flood-free island between the old Havel arm, now known as Unterhafen Spandau and the regulated river. The harbor facilities on this island were linked to the Schulenburg Bridge and the Stresow River in the north via an embankment. Additionally, a port railroad was established to connect the port facilities with the Berlin city railroad at Ruhleben. This harbor primarily handled English gas coal from Hamburg, rolled iron, building materials, and sugar beets. However, the inland port gradually lost its significance, unable to compete with Berlin's Westhafen and Spandauer Nordhafen. Today, the Berliner Hafen- und Lagerhausgesellschaft (BEHALA) manages the 17-hectare port area. The site has been significantly contaminated due to the storage of liquid petroleum products after World War II. Since 1990, BEHALA has been involved in the partial dismantling of elevated and underground tanks, buildings, and sealants, as well as the remediation of the affected areas.

The remediation is not only necessary to protect the Tiefwerder Wiesen. The eastern groundwater downstream of the southern harbor is on the edge of the Tiefwerder water protection area (narrower water protection zone II), and the waterworks' production well is only about 550 meters away. The Tiefwerder waterworks is located between the Havelaltarm Hohler Weg and the Havelchaussee and went into operation in 1914. The builder was Charlottenburger Wasserwerke AG. Today, the plant of Berliner Wasserbetriebe supplies six of Berlin's twelve districts with drinking water. 55 vertical wells with depths of 30 to 100 meters pump a maximum of 100,000 m³ of water daily.

=== Allotment Garden colonies and Little Venice ===
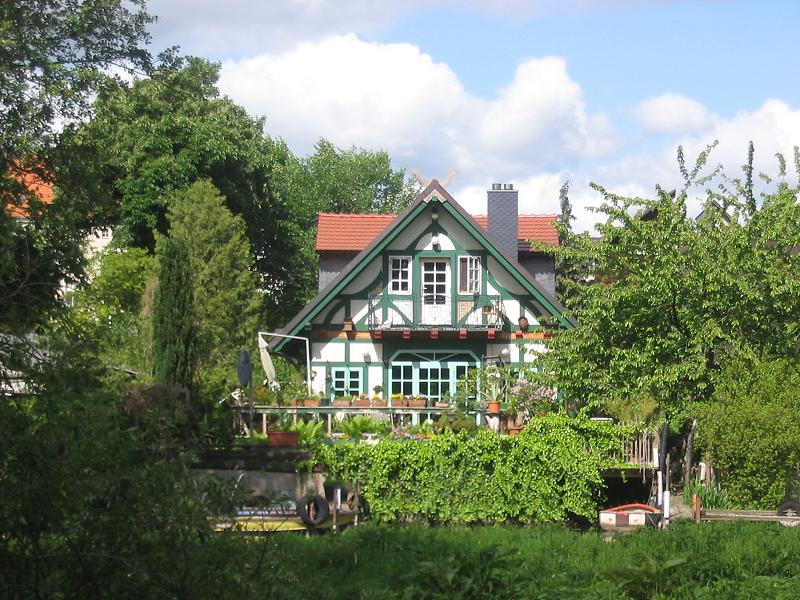
Settlement at the Großer Jürgengraben

The original floodplain of the Tiefwerder Wiesen has gradually diminished since the early 20th century due to infilling and urban development. Starting in 1914, the extraction of drinking water from the waterworks caused a drop in the groundwater level, allowing for the construction of allotment garden colonies and weekend houses to the south of the village and along certain watercourses. After World War II, the freedom meadows to the north were filled with rubble.

The region to the south and east of the old village center, crossed by waterways, is often called "Little Venice". In addition to the Großer and Kleiner Jürgengraben, this area also includes parts of the Tiefwerder Wiesen and their watercourses Hauptgraben and Hohler Weg. Access for residents and visitors to this area is sometimes only possible by boat. In 2005, the Spandau Nature Conservation Office issued termination notices to sixty tenants who held allotment garden plots on state-owned land within the landscape conservation area as part of efforts to restore the natural environment. Although many of the plots have since been cleared and their arbors dismantled, some allotment gardeners successfully challenged the termination in court in 2008.

=== GDR enclave ===
A portion of the Tiefwerder Wiesen, much like parts of the Eiskeller, constituted an enclave of the German Democratic Republic (GDR) within West Berlin. It belonged to the Brandenburg village of Seeburg, which borders Spandau and today forms a district of the municipality of Dallgow-Döberitz. The British, responsible for the sector where this area was located, rejected the GDR's sovereignty claim. However, they recognized the status in a limited manner by instructing the West Berlin authorities to maintain security and order within the area but refraining from official actions there. The unclear status found its tacit settlement in a protocol note to the last territorial exchange agreements in 1988. In this note, both sides declared that they no longer had exclaves within each other's territory from this time.

== Statistical Data ==
Separate data on population development in Tiefwerder are only available to a very limited extent.

=== Population development 1910 to 1935 ===
Until its incorporation into Greater Berlin in 1920, Tiefwerder was an independent rural municipality in the Osthavelland district and at that time covered an area of 30 hectares. In the 1910 census, the village had 854 inhabitants.

Population development in Tiefwerder from 1910 to 1935
	1816	1910	1919	1925	1930	1935
Resident	Colonist families (number unknown)	854	804	835	1.508	818

Following 1935, Tiefwerder's population was not separately recorded. However, it is highly likely that the present-day village, which includes new settlements in the Freiheitswiesen and the northeast, has a considerably larger population than in the 1930s. An estimate of today's population can be gleaned from Spandau's electoral district 303, which encompasses Dorfstraße, Elsgrabenweg, Teltower Straße, and parts of Ruhlebener Straße, Havelchaussee, and Tiefwerderweg, largely coinciding with the area described here. In the 2006 election for the Berlin House of Representatives, there were 972 eligible voters in this electoral district.

=== Electoral behavior ===
==== Reichstag election results 1932/1933 ====
The fact that the NSDAP used the Ballhaus Spandau as a meeting and event location (see above) does not mean that Tiefwerder was a stronghold of National Socialism. In the Reichstag elections in July 1932, November 1932 and March 1933, the NSDAP's share of the vote in Tiefwerder (together with Pichelsdorf and Pichelswerder) remained well below the Spandau average in each case (27.3% to 34.9% Spandau total to 37.4% German Reich total / 27.9% to 33.2% to 33.1% / 38.5% to 41.6% to 43.9%). In contrast, the SPD and KPD both had above-average support in Tiefwerder. Additionally, in the November 1933 referendum on withdrawal from the League of Nations, Tiefwerder had a yes-vote rate of 89.2%, which was the second lowest among the 15 Spandau districts. Siemensstadt was the highest, with 94.9%; the Spandau average was 91.2% yes votes.

==== Election to the House of Representatives 2006 ====
Compared to the entire district of Spandau and all of Berlin, the 972 eligible voters in voting district 303 voted as follows in the 17 September 2006 House of Representatives election; voting district 303 largely represents Tiefwerder (see above):

House of Representatives election in Berlin 2006, second votes in %
	SPD	CDU	The Left	The Greens	FDP	The Grays	NPD	WASG
Voting district 303	35.7	26.8	3.9	11.6	9.5	5.0	2.0	2.5
Spandau as a whole	33.4	31.2	3.8	8.3	8.5	6.4	1.9	2.3
Berlin as a whole	30.8	21.3	13.4	13.1	7.6	3.8	2.6	2.9

== See also ==
- Tiefwerder Wiesen
- Pichelswerder
