= Inflated sedge =

Inflated sedge is a common name for several plants and may refer to:

- Carex intumescens, bladder sedge
- Carex vesicaria, blister sedge
