= Tiefwerder Wiesen =

Remnant of the former floodplain landscape in the Havel/Spreetal lowlands

Landscape protection area Tiefwerder-Wiesen
- Tiefwerder meadows
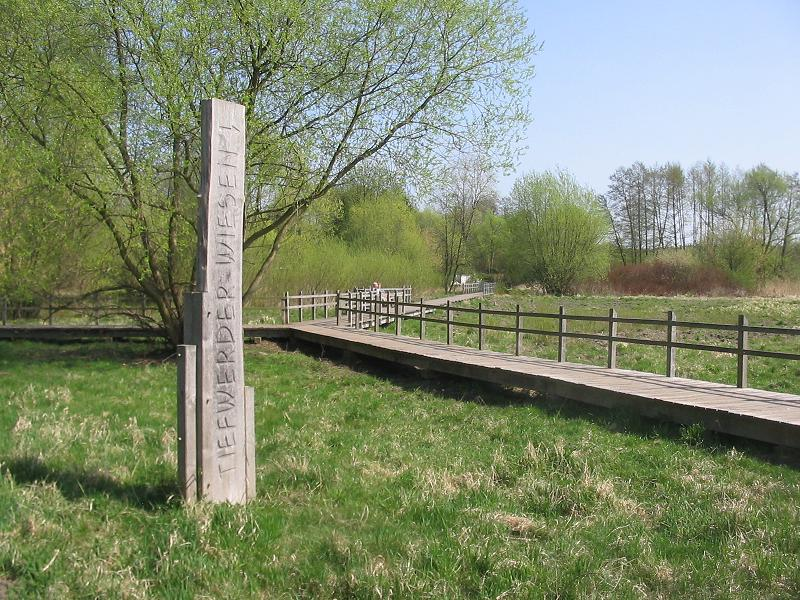
- Boardwalk through the Tiefwerder Wiesen

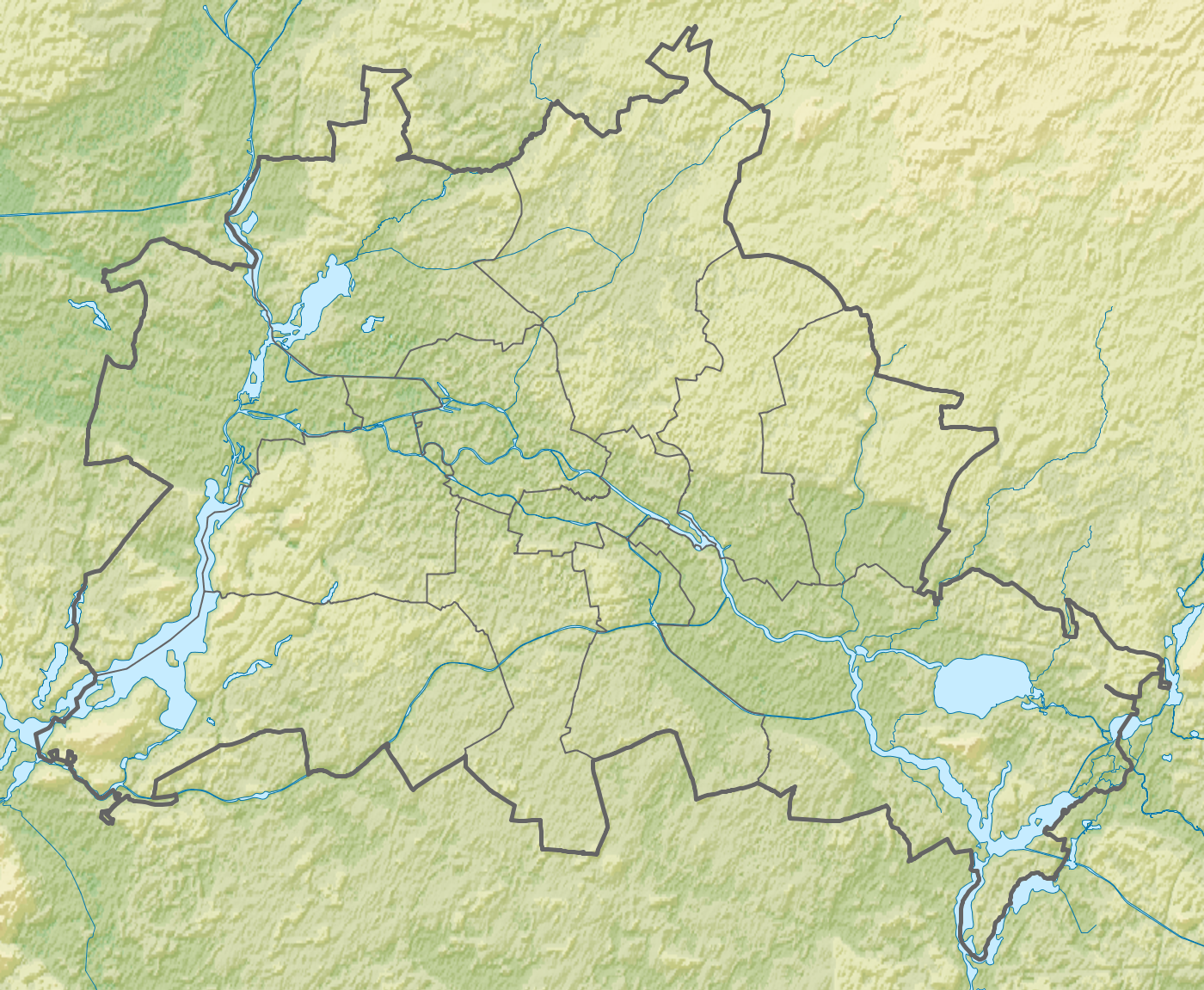
- Location within Berlin
- Location: Berliner Havel-/Spreetalniederung
- Coordinates: 52.5152229°N 13.2088575°E
- Primary inflows: Havel
- Basin countries: Germany
- Max. length: 1,600 m (5,200 ft)
- Max. width: 900 m (3,000 ft)
- Surface area: 66.7 ha (165 acres)
- Max. depth: 1 m (3 ft 3 in)
- Surface elevation: 300 m (980 ft)
- Settlements: Berlin-Spandau, Berlin-Charlottenburg

The Tiefwerder Wiesen (lit. German: Tiefwerder meadows) in Berlin is the remnant of the former floodplain landscape in the Havel/Spreetal lowlands. It is situated in the Tiefwerder area and the lowland region of the Pichelswerder River peninsula in the Wilhelmstadt district of Spandau. These wet meadows contain historical Havel River arms and have been protected under Landschaftsschutzgebiet (LSG) (landscape conservation area) since 1960, covering an area of 66.7 hectares. Within the LSG lies the Faule See (Lazy Lake), which emerged from an old arm of the Havel.

The natural floodplain is the last pike spawning area in Berlin. However, due to the lowering of the Havel water level since 1990, the accessibility of the meadows for the pike has significantly deteriorated. Moreover, the German Unity 17 transport project, if implemented, would cause a further drop in the water level, posing an additional threat to the pike's habitat. Endangered species such as the bladder sedge grow in the wet meadows dominated by sedges in Berlin. The LSG serves as an important inner-city link in the Havel biotope network and functions as a flight path for bats and a migration route for the native beaver. Since 2007, Berlin has been considering extending its protected status to a nature reserve.

== Territory boundaries ==
The highly dissected landscape conservation area lies between the Havel, the Havelchaussee, and the Heerstraße (Bundesstraßen B 2/B 5).

It starts in the north with a narrow east tip of the Freiheitswiesen on Tiefwerder. The western boundary runs southwest between an allotment/weekend settlement and a forest and meadow area, then continues along the Faulen See Lake, and finally crosses the Kleiner Jürgengraben ditch. In the lowland area south of the village of Tiefwerder, the boundary turns west and runs along the Kleiner Jürgengraben for a short distance to the Havel River. Along the river and the Havelseenweg, the western border stretches south almost to the Freybrücke (Frey bridge) and, after a short detour, it reaches the Heerstraße on Pichelswerder.

On the eastern side, the boundary starts from the narrow northern tip of the area, omitting the Tiefwerder waterworks. It runs southward along the Havelchaussee and the Havelaltarm Hohler Weg, which flows into the Stößensee Lake. Here, it also runs parallel to the district border with Charlottenburg-Wilmersdorf, which is marked by the S-Bahn embankment of the Spandauer Vorortbahn (Spandau Suburban Railway), located a few meters away from the Havelchaussee. Just before reaching the Stößensee Lake, the LSG border crosses the Hohlen Weg to the west towards the Steffenhorn and runs below the Schulzenwall and Langer Wall along the Hauptgraben back to the north. Then it circles the weekend settlement on the hill of Pichelswerder at the transverse ditch to the Toten Mantel, turns south again below the hill, and reaches the Heerstraße past the Pichelswerder natural gas storage facility. The southern boundary follows Heerstraße for about 300 meters. The landscape conservation area measures approximately 1.6 kilometers in length from north to south and about 900 meters in width, from west to east.

During the German division, the GDR claimed a small part of the Tiefwerder Wiesen as an exclave of the municipality of Seeburg. However, this claim had no consequences due to the opposition of the British authorities.

== Geology, natural space, and climate ==
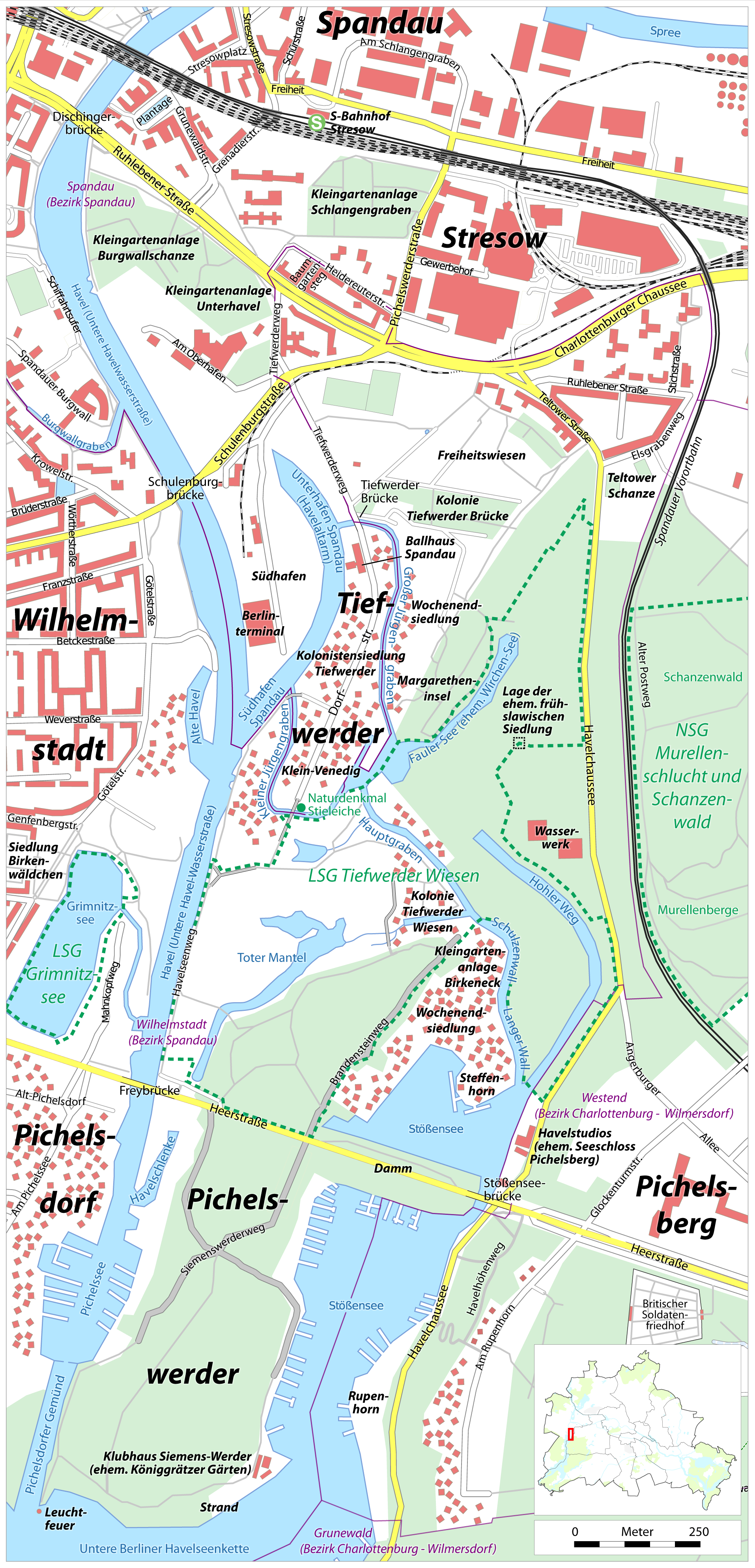
Location of the LSG Tiefwerder-Wiesen (borders of the LSG dashed in green) in the Spree - Havel lowlands

The Tiefwerder Wiesen is located in the southern part of the Spree where it meets the Havel River. This region is part of the Weichselian glacial valley in Berlin, characterized by thick sands that reach depths of over 20 meters. The Havel River follows a glacial channel in this area and does not extensively utilize the glacial valley.

On the eastern side, separated by the Havelchaussee and the S-Bahn embankment, lies the Schanzenwald forest, which also belongs to the valley sand area of the Spree lowlands. The Schanzenwald merges into the Murellenberge mountains, creating the Murellenschlucht canyon and Schanzenwald forest nature reserve. These hilly areas are part of the northwestern edge of the Teltow Plateau. Interestingly, the Tiefwerder Wiesen and the Schanzenwald forest run parallel to each other, separated by only a few meters, but are now divided by the S-Bahn embankment of the Spandauer Vorortbahn, also known as Olympic Railway. This railroad was built during preparations for the Summer Olympics, which were canceled due to the First World War, and eventually took place in Berlin 20 years later.

To the west of the Havel channel lies the former lowland Börnicker Lake, also known as Birnicker Lake. On its marshy meadows, the Spandauer Südpark (Spandau South Park) was established in 1923, featuring the Südparksee Lake. The channel continues to flow towards Scharfen Lanke and Grimnitzsee, which are located on the opposite side of the Havel, facing the Tiefwerder Wiesen. South of the Heerstrasse, the LSG Tiefwerder-Wiesen is followed by the landscape conservation area Pichelswerder, after which the Havel, which is canalized at Tiefwerder, opens into the southern Berlin Havel Lake chain. The Tiefwerder meadows are assigned to the Brandenburg-Potsdam Havel area (No. 812) in the natural space unit D 12a (East German Lowlands, Central Brandenburg Plates and Lowlands).

The Tiefwerder Wiesen is in a temperate climate zone, transitioning from the Atlantic-influenced climate of Northern/Western Europe to the continental climate of Eastern Europe, which is similar to the outskirts of Berlin.

== Anthropogenic influences on flood dynamics ==
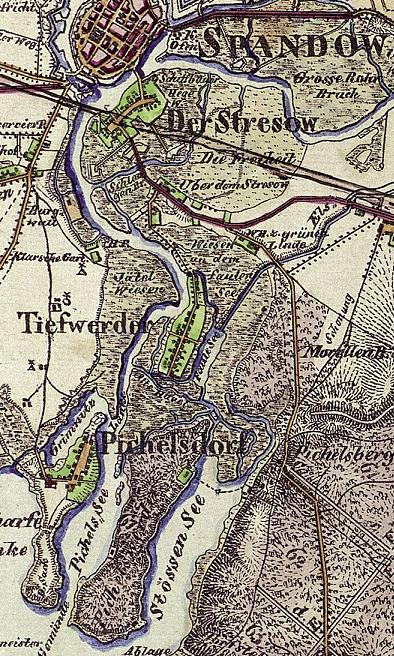
Tiefwerder on a map from 1842 (detail). The Elsgraben from the Spree to the Faulen See has already been mapped.

The biotope and landscape function of the Tiefwerder Wiesen also referred to as pike spawning meadows, relies heavily on their flood dynamics, which are greatly influenced by the water level of the Havel River and human activities. The Havel lakes play a significant role in regulating the water levels, resulting in a relatively stable environment. The river’s low gradient averaging about 0.05% (equivalent to 5 cm per kilometer), ensures a serene and tranquil flow through the country.

=== Middle ages ===
Archaeological discoveries of vessel fragments, belonging to the Prague type and dating back to the sixth to the eighth century, provide evidence of an early Slavic settlement on the eastern shore of the Faulen See (Lazy Lake), which was known as Wirchen Lake until the 19th century. The Middle Ages saw the presence of a Slavic settlement, although it did not significantly impact the water regime of the region. However, many of the Havel's old water names and the former lake name, likely derived from the settlement's name (Wirchen from Slavic verch/virch = height, elevation - referring to the neighboring Teltow slopes), trace back to this historical period.

Following German settlement, the water level of the Havel experienced a significant rise around 1180, attributed to a backwater in Spandau. This increase was primarily caused by the mill dam of the city of Brandenburg, which played a role in altering the flooding dynamics of the area. Despite water regulations implemented during the pre-industrial period between 1500 and 1750, the water balance of the region remained largely unaffected.

=== Havel regulations, and Elsgraben ===
Until the mid-19th century, the vast and intricate network of estuary branches from the Spree and numerous ramifications of the Havel would regularly flood the lowlands between the Spree and Pichelswerder. In 1880 and 1881, the canalization of the Havel, known for its strong meandering at Tiefwerder, and the river regulation during the expansion of the southern harbor at Tiefwerder in 1908 significantly altered the water network. However, the Elsgraben, built in 1832, played a crucial role in maintaining good flood dynamics. This canal diverted floodwaters from the Spree directly into the Tiefwerder Wiesen. Originally navigable until 1886, the Elsgraben gradually filled in around 1930. It connected the (old) Spree opposite the former Otternbucht (approximately at the location of today's Reuter combined heat and power plant) with the Faulen See. The primary purpose of the ditch was to protect Spandau by directing water away from the city through the Faulen See into the Havel in case of floods. Additionally, the Elsgraben facilitated the drainage of the Verlandungsmoor Fließwiese Ruhleben (Flow meadow Ruhleben), a former dead ice channel and the northern continuation of the dry valley Murellenschlucht canyon, into the Tiefwerder Wiesen.

=== Settlement construction and conflicts of interest ===
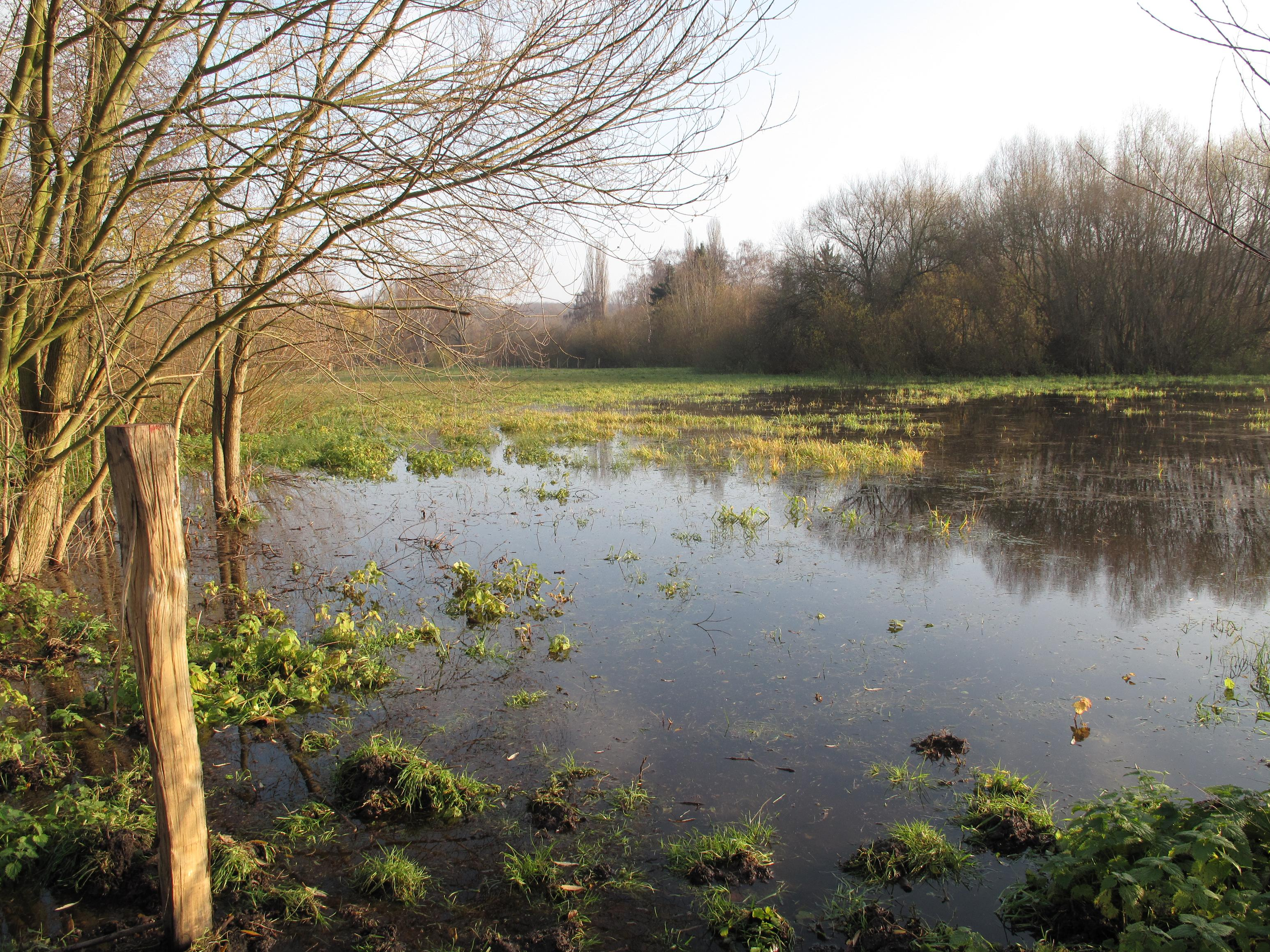
Meadows partially wet after heavy rainfall in November 2010

In the early 20th century, the floodplain area underwent significant changes due to settlement construction and industrial development. Embankments were built, narrowing the floodplain over time. In 1816, the fishing village of Tiefwerder was established in a higher and flood-free area, marking the first steps of human settlement in the region. As industrial facilities sprouted in the northern part of the area from 1910 onwards, further changes to the landscape were set in motion. The construction of the Heerstraße, between 1910 and 1912, further divided the Stößensee with an embankment, affecting the nearby Pichelswerder as well. The demand for drinking water from the Tiefwerder waterworks prompted the lowering of the groundwater level, starting in 1914. This change allowed for the construction of allotment colonies and weekend houses to the south of the village and along certain ditches. The freedom meadows (Freiheitswiesen) to the north were filled with rubble after the Second World War.

Today, the remaining floodplain in the Tiefwerder-Wiesen landscape conservation area consists only of a limited lowland area south of the village. To protect the delicate wet meadows, the state of Berlin undertook measures in the 1980s, removing road embankments and filled-in paths. Some of the pathways were replaced with footbridges and bridges, promoting a more sustainable approach to the preservation of the area's natural beauty. In 2005, the Naturschutzamt Spandau (Spandau Nature Conservation Office) issued notices of termination to 67 tenants who had allotment garden plots on state-owned land within the LSG. Though many plots have been cleared and their arbors dismantled, legal disputes arose, with some allotment gardeners successfully contesting the termination in court. Presently, certain residents are voicing opposition to the electric fences erected for the commercial keeping of water buffalo, goats, and sheep. These fences encompass several former recreational areas, and allotment gardeners have been granted the right to use them.

=== Transport project German Unity 17 ===
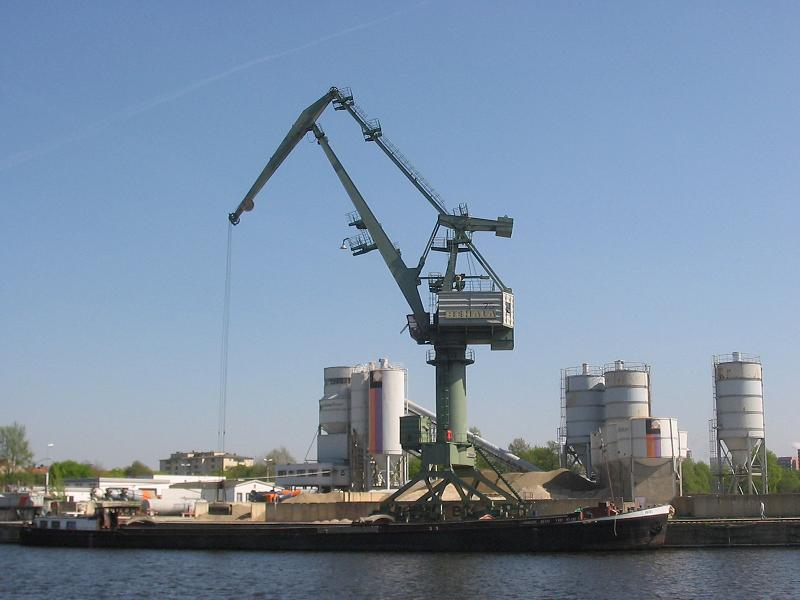
Havel, southern port of Spandau

Various factors such as the reduction of the Spree inflows in Lusatia (the water volume that the Spree fed to the Havel was more than twice as high as that of the Havel itself at its mouth until 1990, 38 m^{3}/s compared to 15 m^{3}/s) or the deepening of the Havel led to a lowering of the Havel water level since 1990. Additionally, the deteriorating flood dynamics have resulted in limited accessibility of the small remaining area for pike, making it possible only during specific years. For instance, prior to 1990, the water level of 29.55 meters above sea level was undercut on 220 days per year, whereas in the 2000s, it reached about 310 days per year. Meanwhile, the water level in the Havel has been reduced to a minimum.

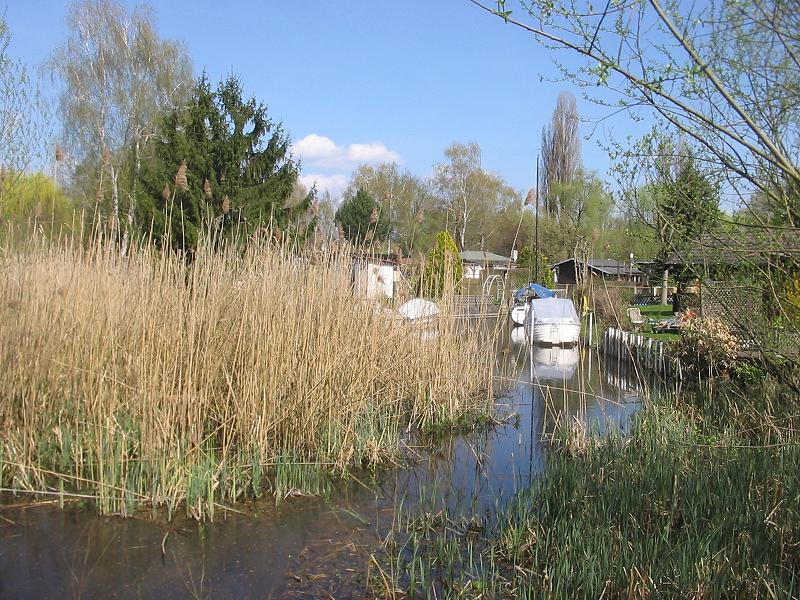
Weekend settlement at the connecting ditch Dead Mantle – main ditch

The transport project "German Unity" 17 (VDE No. 17) has posed a major threat to the flood dynamics of the Tiefwerder Wiesen. This project involves the expansion of waterways to accommodate barges up to 2000 tons, with an unloading depth of up to 2.8 meters to access the western harbor. The federal waterway link Rühen - Magdeburg - Berlin - which is highly controversial for ecological reasons, includes expanding the Lower Havel Waterway, the Elbe–Havel Canal, and the straightening of a section of the Spree River. The entire stretch was to be dredged to a depth of four meters and, depending on the bank profile, to a water level width of 42–55 meters (up to 72 meters in curves).

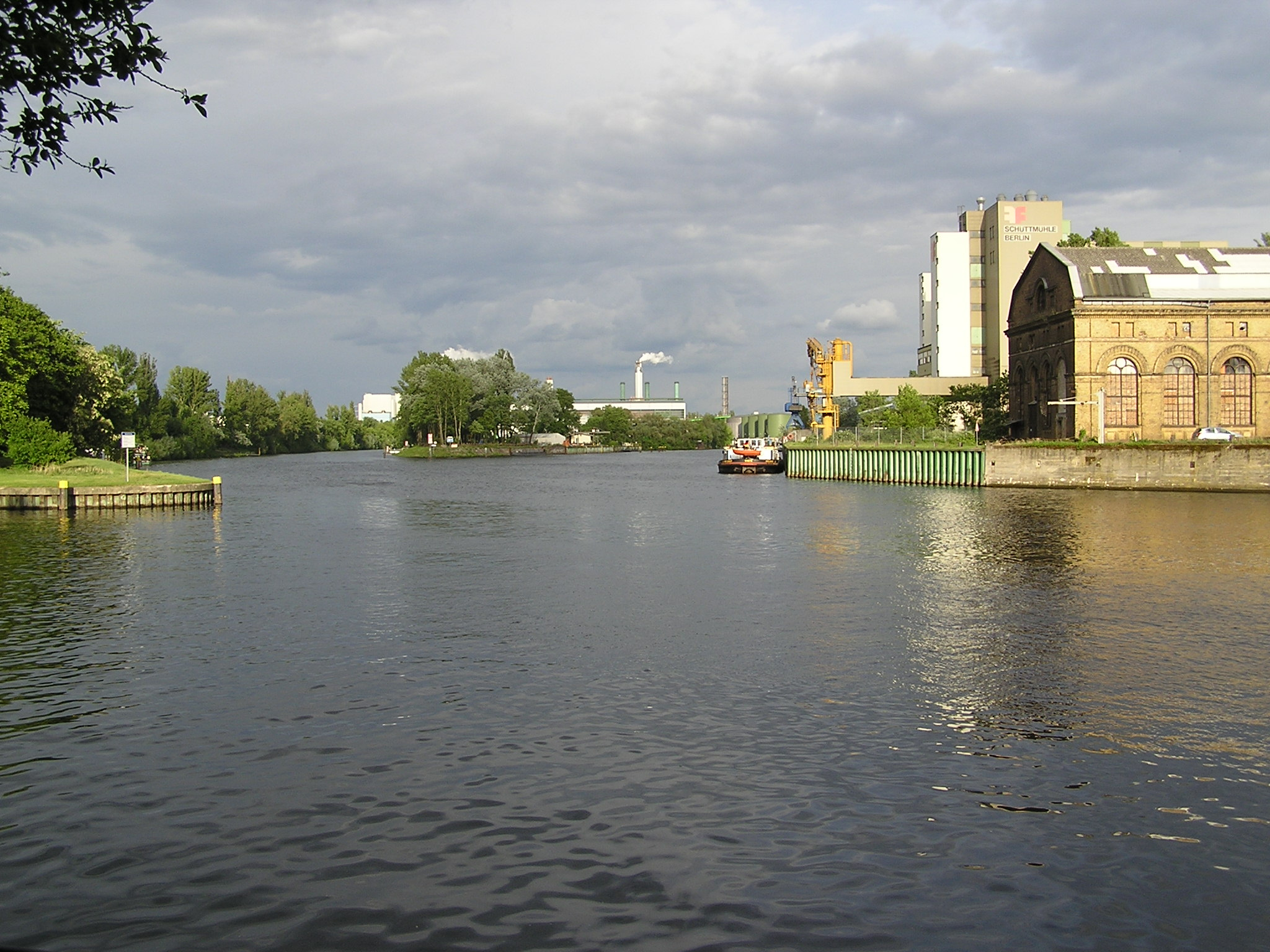
Estuary of the Spree into the Havel, on the right the Schüttmühle Berlin

According to an interim report from the Berlin House of Representatives in February 2009, the transport project could lead to a drop in water levels, resulting in changes to the flooding dynamics of the Tiefwerder Wiesen. It is predicted that water levels might decrease by 1 to a maximum of 13 cm, depending on the discharge situation of low, medium, or high water. As a result, the meadows might no longer experience the same natural flooding patterns they currently do. Despite facing opposition and objections, there are plans to proceed with the project. In response, the state of Berlin aims to protect the Tiefwerder Wiesen by implementing compensatory measures, including artificial irrigation using water from the Havel and the construction of fish ladders. The Federal Waterways and Shipping Administration planned to do this:

"In the course of intervention management for VDE 17, WNA B is therefore now planning, in close coordination with the responsible district and senate administrations, the construction and operation of two small siphon facilities, which in the future will be used to simulate the water level dynamics on the pike spawning meadows that were recorded before 1990. When water levels are high, water should then be transferred from the Havel to the lower-lying Tiefwerder meadows. In order to keep the water in the wetland for as long as possible, a near-natural bottom ramp should be created in the drainage area towards the Jürgengraben, which can also be passed by fish. In this way, the valuable wetland will be sustainably protected against the effects from the VDE 17, but also from the use-related and climatic changes in the Havel catchment area."

— VDE 17 – A chance for the Tiefwerder meadows, June 2008

== Flora and fauna ==
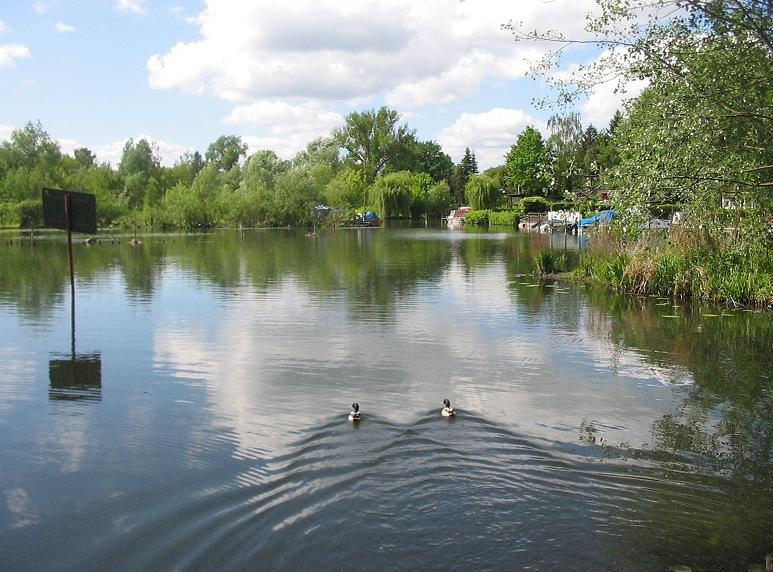
Lake at the confluence of the Großer Jürgengraben, Faulem See, Hauptgraben and Kleiner Jürgengraben

The description of the species-rich flora and fauna of the Tiefwerder Wiesen refers to the population of the 2000s.

=== Plants and plant communities ===
==== Sedge reeds and reeds ====
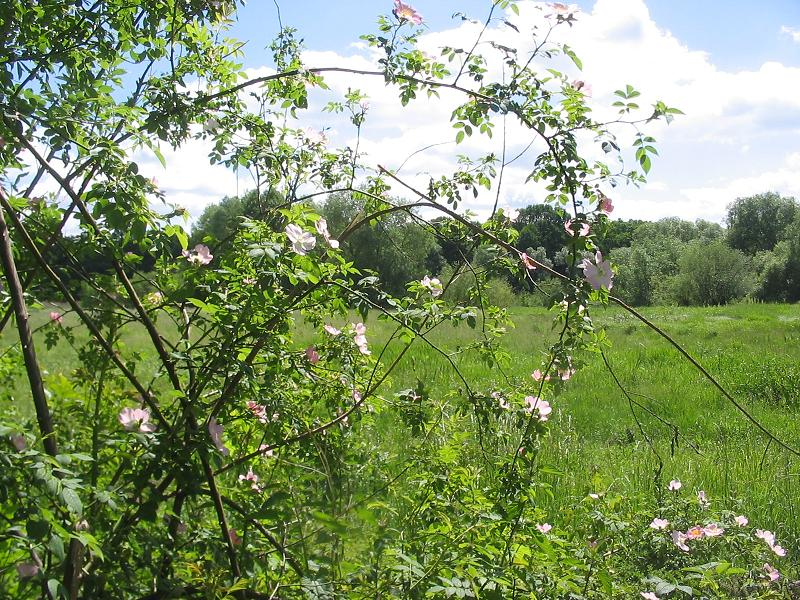
Dog rosebush at the edge of the meadow

The flooded tall sedge meadows that long dominated the Tiefwerder Wiesen are declining due to increasingly infrequent flooding. However, the riparian sedge, growing up to two meters tall, can still be found along the water bodies' edges. Instead, the wet meadow areas and fallows are now characterized by slender sedge meadows from the sedge genus. The main plant in this community is the slender sedge, a perennial, herbaceous plant that can reach heights between 30 and 150 cm (12 and 59 in). In the siltation areas, it is joined by the bladder sedge, which is endangered in Berlin and occasionally forms a hybrid with the slender sedge. The slender sedge reed has a long survival capacity with increasing drainage but is displaced by reed canary grass in areas of better-aerated soils. Extensive water swath reeds, also known as giant swaths or sweetgrass, dominate the wetter parts of the meadow, often forming pure stands. These sweetgrass plants can grow up to two meters high. From May to July, the cuckoo campion adds pink flowers and stands up to 60 cm tall in the sedge and reed-rich areas of the meadow. Pennywort and yellow-flowered marsh marigolds also bloom in this period, while the marsh marigold might also have a weaker second flowering phase between July and October. Later in the season, the meadow rue with yellow buttercups (June to August) and poison buttercups, especially in June, contribute to the yellow flowering display. From July to September, the dark purple flowers of the marsh thistle add contrast to the yellow blooms. In early summer, wild rose shrubs like the dog rose showcase many light pink flowers along the paths and shrubbery edges.

==== Reed belt and floodplain forest relics ====
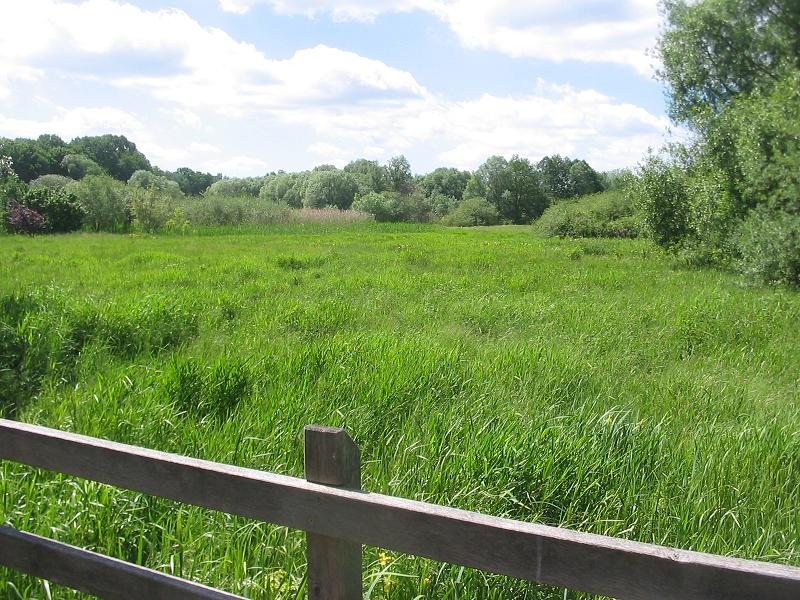
Boardwalk through reeds

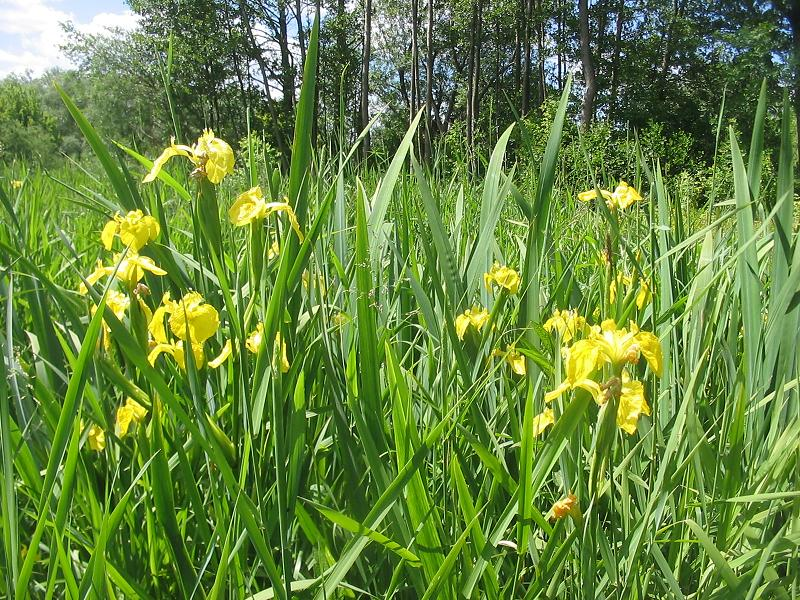
The specially protected water iris in the Tiefwerder meadows

In the vast reed and cattail belts of the river arms and ditches, one can experience a beautiful array of colors provided by sporadic purple loosestrife, marsh zest, and the water iris, which is classified as species protected under the Bundesartenschutzverordnung (BArtSchV) (Federal Species Protection Ordinance). The delicate hues of violet-red, burgundy, whitish, and yellow color create a picturesque landscape. The open riparian areas and watercourse edges are characterized by willow bushes and floodplain forest relics, including silver willow and fluttering elm. Especially at the Havelaltarm Toter Mantel, which extends to Heerstraße, a softwood floodplain is preserved. In the zones with rich herbaceous flora, plants like the marsh fern (Theylpteris palustris), marsh ragwort, stiff sedge, and common loosestrife, which was formerly administered in folk medicine for scurvy, diarrhea, and fever. Originally from the Himalayas, the balsam is spreading strongly on wet, nutrient-rich meadows, forming dense stands of dominance. The fast-growing and rapidly multiplying neophyte was first imported to England from Kashmir in 1839, from where it reached the European continent as an ornamental plant. It belongs to the heterosporous plants, which were deliberately introduced ethelochor. Similar to other water lily plants, the yellow pond lily, which is protected in Germany, covers large areas of open water with floating foliage. Rich yellow, hermaphroditic flowers 4 to 12 cm in diameter protrude from its sea of green leaves.

=== Animals ===
The Tiefwerder-Wiesen biotope provides a diverse habitat for fish, amphibians, reptiles, insects, birds, and mammals such as bats and the beaver, which has now become a permanent resident after several guest visits.

==== Fishes ====
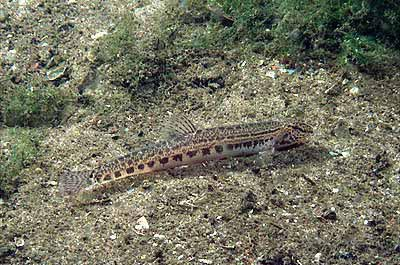
Spined loach

The significance of the Tiefwerder Wiesen as a pike spawning ground lies in the oviposition of the predatory fish. From March to May, the substrate spawner seeks out flooded floodplain meadows or shallow shore areas of standing waters. Here, the pike carefully attaches its eggs to water plants, roots, or branches. While the second traditional Berlin pike spawning meadow at Parschenkessel on Pfaueninsel became inaccessible to the pike years ago, the fish have also been unable to reach Tiefwerder Wiesen since 1990. "With water depths of less than 5 centimeters, it is only possible for juvenile fish to swim through the connection from the main ditch. However, in wetter years, some old fish can manage to do this, ensuring successful spawning in the Tiefwerder Wiesen."

Measuring up to 1.5 meters long, the pike preys on whitefish species such as roach, white bream, and rudd, which are known for peacefully coexisting and spawning in abundance in the ditches and river oxbow lakes, just like river perch. Similarly, the protected turbot, under Annex II of the Fauna-Flora-Habitat (FFH) (Habitats Directive), searches for food only at night and burrows into the bottom during the day, with only its head and tail protruding. Another species of concern, the asp, a member of the carp family, gather in small schools as juveniles but develops into solitary fish as adults. For this fish, survival relies on the accessibility and patency of waterways.

==== Mammals ====
The otter, occasionally spotted in the Tiefwerder Wiesen, finds its ideal habitat in the shallow, fish-rich Havelaltarms and the flood plains. This aquatic marten species is listed as threatened on the Berlin Red List of Endangered Species (as of 2003) and is strictly protected under the Bundesartenschutzverordnung (BArtSchV) (Federal Ordinance on the Protection of Species). Despite special surveys and conversation efforts by the state of Berlin to safeguard its population, uncertainties persist about the otter's ability to establish a stable presence in Berlin. Their habitats are constrained by bank construction, water pollution, recreational pressure, and potential losses from traffic and fish traps. Similarly, the beaver also holds the same protection status and has been native to the Upper Havel and Lake Tegel since 1994 as a "true new citizen" with several beaver burrows. From Lake Tegel, the rodent visited the Tiefwerder Wiesen down the Havel several times as a guest. In the meantime (as of 2008), beavers are said to have settled permanently in Tiefwerder.

The Tiefwerder Wiesen serves as a nurturing ground for various wildlife, including foxes and badgers. However, the abundant presence of wild boars has become a concern, with the Senate Department for Urban Development citing their burrowing activity as a contributing factor to the decline of the tall sedge meadows. For the planned designation of the landscape conservation area as a nature reserve, the state of Berlin conducted investigations on the bat fauna in the Tiefwerder Wiesen and Pichelswerder in 2007. Bats such as the greater mouse-eared bat (strictly protected according to the BArtSchV and listed in Annex II of the Fauna-Flora-Habitat-Richtlinie (FFH) (Habitats Directive); downgraded in Berlin 2003 from endangered to critically endangered) and the water bat (upgraded in Berlin 2003 from endangered to critically endangered) frequently use the Havel channel as a flight path and hunting ground. These nocturnal and highly social bats seek out the insect-rich Tiefwerder Wiesen for hunting, starting from their roosts in places like the Citadel or the old walls on Pfaueninsel.

==== Insects ====
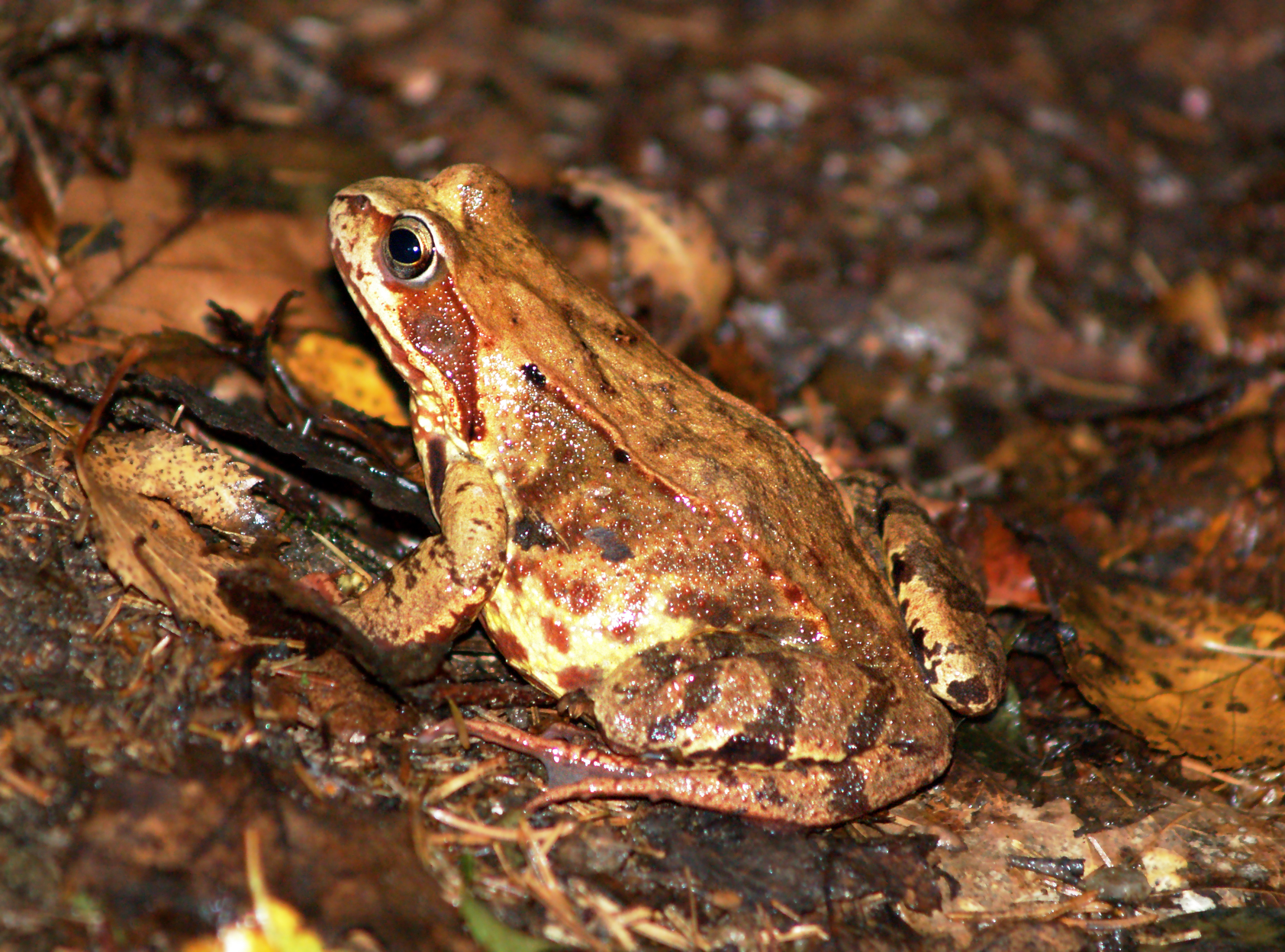
Adult common frog female. Due to a positive population development, the frog is no longer considered endangered in Berlin.

Among the insects, the presence of the black cobwater beetle (Hydrophilus aterrimus) in the Tiefwerder is noteworthy, as it is highly endangered in Berlin. This heat-loving water beetle, strictly protected under the Bundesartenschutzverordnung (BNatSchG), strongly resembles the large water beetle, and prefers larger, mostly perennial waters in sunny areas. Although many waters are suitable for adult large beetles (length up to five centimeters), they are not suitable for their larvae. Especially the 1st and 2nd larval stages require extremely shallow, vegetated, and undisturbed shallow water areas. The young larvae, supported by plant growth, lift their food (small aquatic snails) out of the water to predigest it outside their body.

Several weevil species were last recorded in the Tiefwerder Wiesen in the 1980s and early 1990s. Since intensive searches did not yield any further findings, the small beetles (1.3–20 mm) are mostly considered lost in Berlin. Among them are the shore weevil (Ceutorhynchus scapularis; last record August 1985, one specimen), the hollow-toothed weevil (Datonychus angulosus; May 1990, four specimens), the suture-striped catkin weevil (Dorytomus hirtipennis; February 1991, fifteen specimens found in the bark scales of a silver willow), and the broad silky weevil (Smicronyx smreczynskii; June 1989, one specimen). The silt weevil (Pelenomus velaris), which prefers vegetation-free, periodically flooded, waterlogged sand and mud areas, and its developing plant is not known. It was recorded in Berlin for the first and last time in May 1990 with one specimen. In December 2003, a specimen of the brown-red willow weevil (Ellescus infirmus) was found for the first time on the sieve (soil sample) of a willow in the Tiefwerder Wiesen.

==== Other animals ====
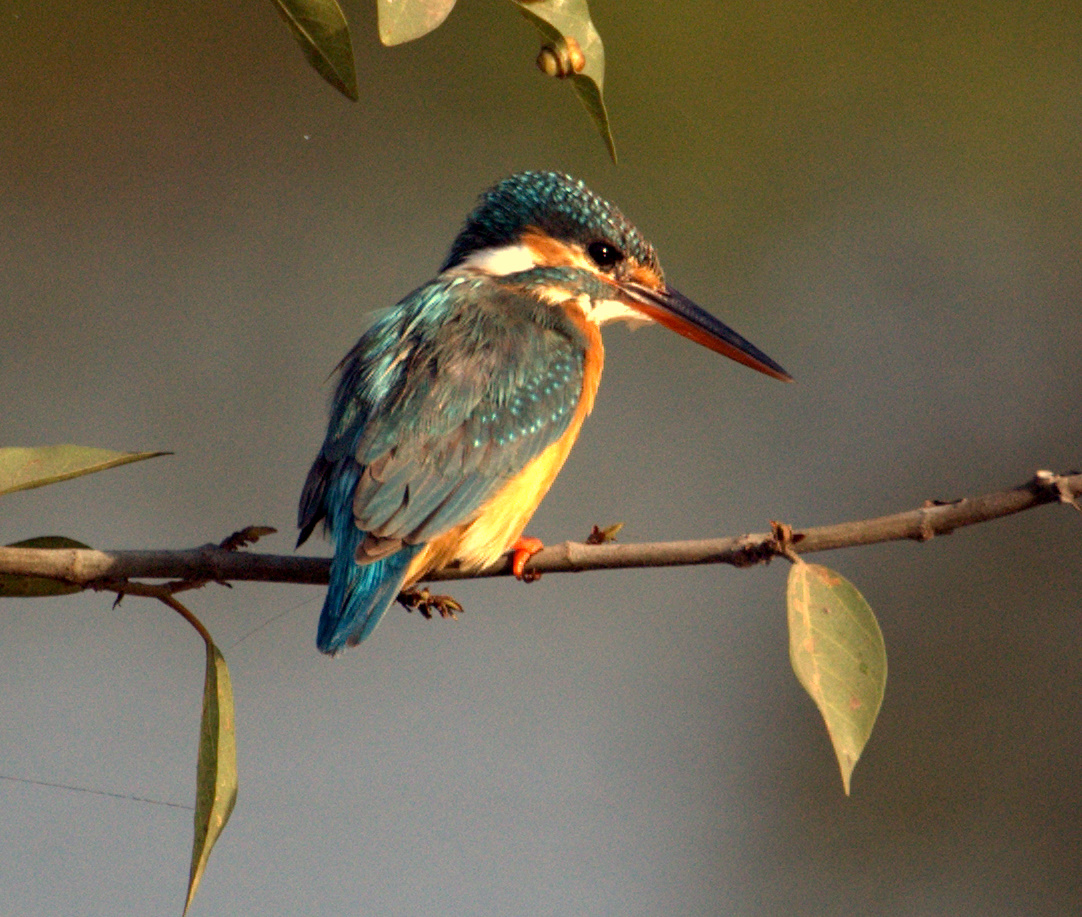
The Critically Endangered Kingfisher, twice Bird of the Year

The reedbeds of the Tiefwerder Wiesen are home to the grass frog, which is specially protected under the BNatSchG, but since a good population trend was noted as early as 1991, it is no longer classified as endangered on the current Berlin Red List of 2003. The grass snake, however, remains endangered in Berlin. It also finds its preferred habitat in the area: structurally rich wetlands, both aquatic and terrestrial.

Grey herons are a common sight as they linger in the meadows before their autumn migration south to feed. The Tiefwerder Wiesen also serves rare and endangered bird species as breeding, migratory, and wintering grounds. For example, the kingfisher, which is highly endangered in Berlin, can occasionally be seen. Due to its endangerment, this species, which is strictly protected under the BNatSchG, has already been voted Bird of the Year twice in Germany, in 1973 and 2009. The sedge meadows, reeds, and tall grasses are home to pond warbler, marsh warbler, dunnock, coot, and little grebe, among others. The bird of the year 1983, the sand martin, is also found in the Tiefwerder Wiesen. Its young birds congregate in large numbers on roosts in the reeds and willow thickets after leaving the breeding burrows.

== Nature conservation and trails ==
=== Protected areas and maintenance measures ===
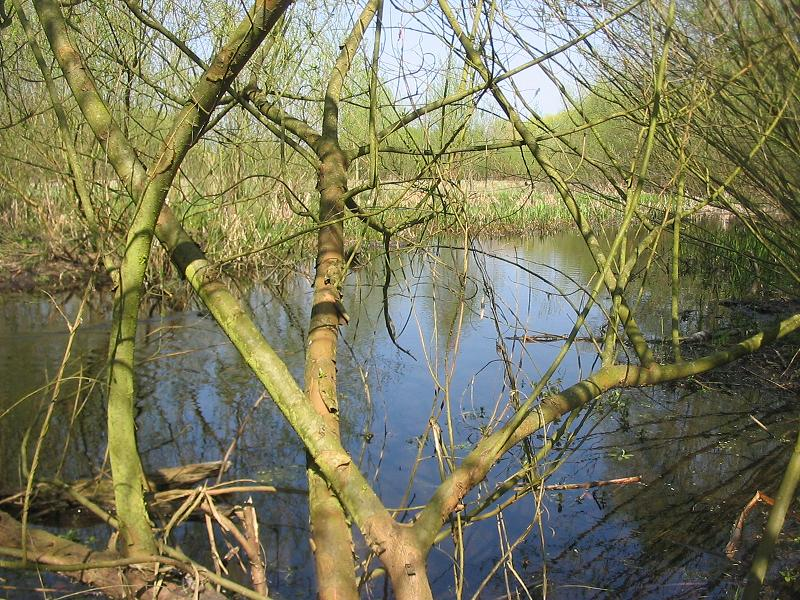
Toter Mantel

With the Ordinance for the Protection of Landscape Parts in the District of Spandau of Berlin, the Tieferwerder Wiesen has been designated as a Landschaftsschutz or LSG (protected landscape area). Today, it is listed as No.24 and it covers an area of 66.69 ha. Since 2007, the state has been considering raising its protection status as a nature reserve. Due to its proximity to the Tiefwerder waterworks, which supply drinking water to six Berlin districts, significant portions of the LSG are part of the narrower water protection zone II.

The Senate Department of Urban Development and Environmental Protection stated the target in the 1994 Landscape Program and Species Conservation Program:

"The still preserved, natural landscape elements of these lowland areas are to be protected and extended. The Ruhleben flowing meadow, the Tiefwerder meadows and the Schönower meadows are to be maintained as extensive wet meadows. Along the watercourses, continuous green and open spaces are to be created as connecting elements and planted according to their location (wet meadows and woody plants of the alder marsh, floodplain and oak-hornbeam forests).

— Landscape Program and Species Protection Program 1994, Berlin

The main focus of preservation and protection measures within the landscape conservation area is to maintain flood dynamics. This may involve artificial irrigation of the Tiefwerder Wiesen with Havel water and the construction of fish ladders if necessary. Another priority is preserving the softwood meadows, especially for the beaver population after removing dams, roads, arbors, and bank obstructions. Since 2014, regular maintenance mowing has stopped, and instead, a conservation approach using Asian water buffalo, sheep, and goats has been adopted to manage the meadows and conserve the ecosystem. These animals are protected and kept effective by enclosing the meadows with electric fences, preventing access by residents and visitors. Additionally, forestry measures are planned to develop the adjacent Pichelswerder forest into a near-natural mixed oak forest.

=== Road network and connection to Berlin's green corridors ===
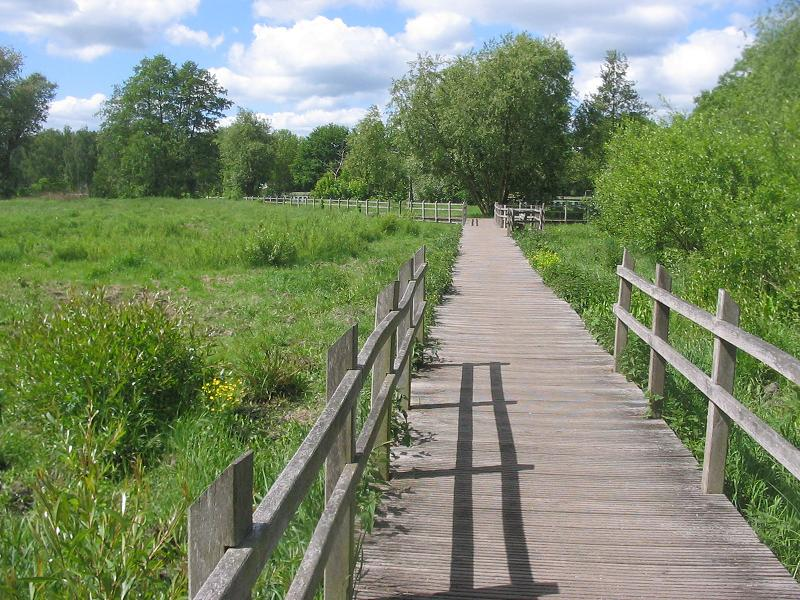
Boardwalk

A circular trail provides access to the central wetland. A plank footbridge about 200 meters long, built in 1996, leads through the wet meadows, while wooden bridges guide over several ditches and the Totes Mantel. An additional long footbridge over the Kleiner Jürgengraben connects the meadows with the Dorfstraße in Tiefwerder and two footpaths with the Heerstraße.

Towards the south, the area is linked to the Havel Heights Trail via Pichelswerder and the Grunewald, while to the east, it connects to the natural area of the Murellenberge and the Ruhleben flowing meadow at the Teltownord edge. In 2004, the Senate Department for Urban Development proposed an elevated path on the edge of the Teltownord as part of a plan for the western region of Berlin. This path would create an almost continuous green corridor, starting from the Tiefwerder Wiesen, passing via Charlottenburg Palace and the Großer Tiergarten to the western part of the city. In 2007, DB ProjektBau also completed the Bullengraben Green Corridor as a nature conservation compensation measure for the adverse effects on nature and the landscape caused by the construction project for the high-speed rail line between Hanover and Berlin. The Bullengraben green corridor runs about 4.5 kilometers west of Staaken along the Havel River. To further enhance the green corridor and connect it to Tiefwerder and the Tiefwerdre Wiesen, the Senate administration proposed the construction of a pedestrian footbridge across the river, as the Bullengraben green corridor meets the Havel only about one kilometer north of the village of Tiefwerder.

=== The Tiefwerder meadows in the Havel biotope network ===
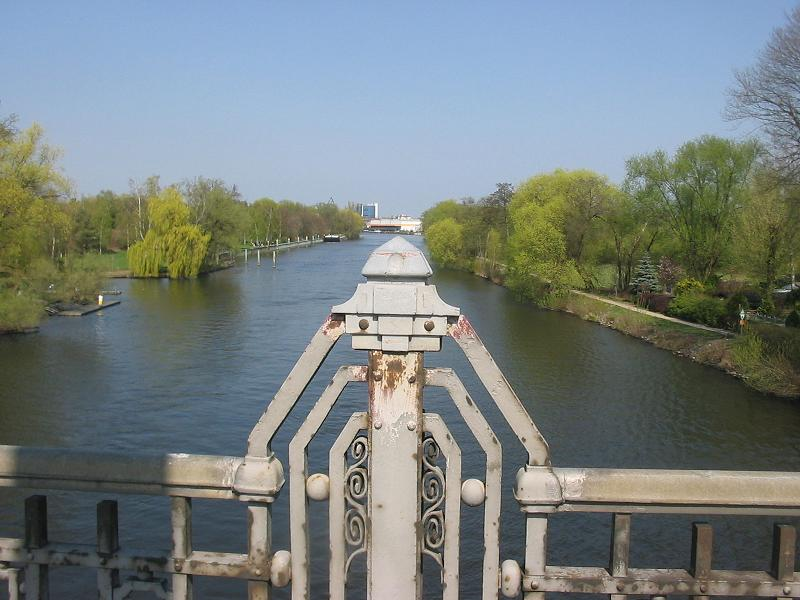
View of the Havel and the Tiefwerder meadows from the Frey Bridge (right)

The biotope network is recognized for its vital role in linking habitats for the conservation of endangered species and has been anchored as a new conservation goal in the Naturschutzgesetz or NSG (Nature Conservation Act). The Havel River and its continuity are of immense importance for migrating fish, as a flight path for bats, as a breeding, migration, and wintering area for birds, and as a migration route for beavers and otters. Recognizing its significance, Berlin's nature conservation associations included the Havel as a connecting landscape element in their list of proposals for the re-registration of protected areas under Article 10 of the European Fauna-Flora-Habitat Directive (FFH) for the state of Berlin in 2000. In Berlin alone, the Havel River links ten landscape protection areas and three nature conservation areas, including the Imchen Island near Kladow NSG, the Pfaueninsel NSG, and the Spandauer Forst LSG. Along its course, it connects existing FFH areas such as the Uckermärkische Seenlandschaft or the Tegeler Fließ, as well as designated SPA areas like the Havelländisches Luch or the lowlands of the lower Havel. Together with the adjacent luch landscapes such as Rhinluch, Havelländisches Luch, Dossebruch and Jäglitzniederung, the lower Havel lowlands form the largest contiguous inland wetland in western-Central Europe. Within this extensive biotope network, the centrally located Tiefwerder Wiesen plays a crucial role as an inner-city link and acts as a "stepping stone for crossing the urban area" for many species.

== See also ==
- Pichelswerder
- Tiefwerder
