= Pichelswerder =

River island of the Havel in Berlin's Wilhelmstadt district of the Spandau district

Coordinates: 52°30′26″N 13°12′20″E

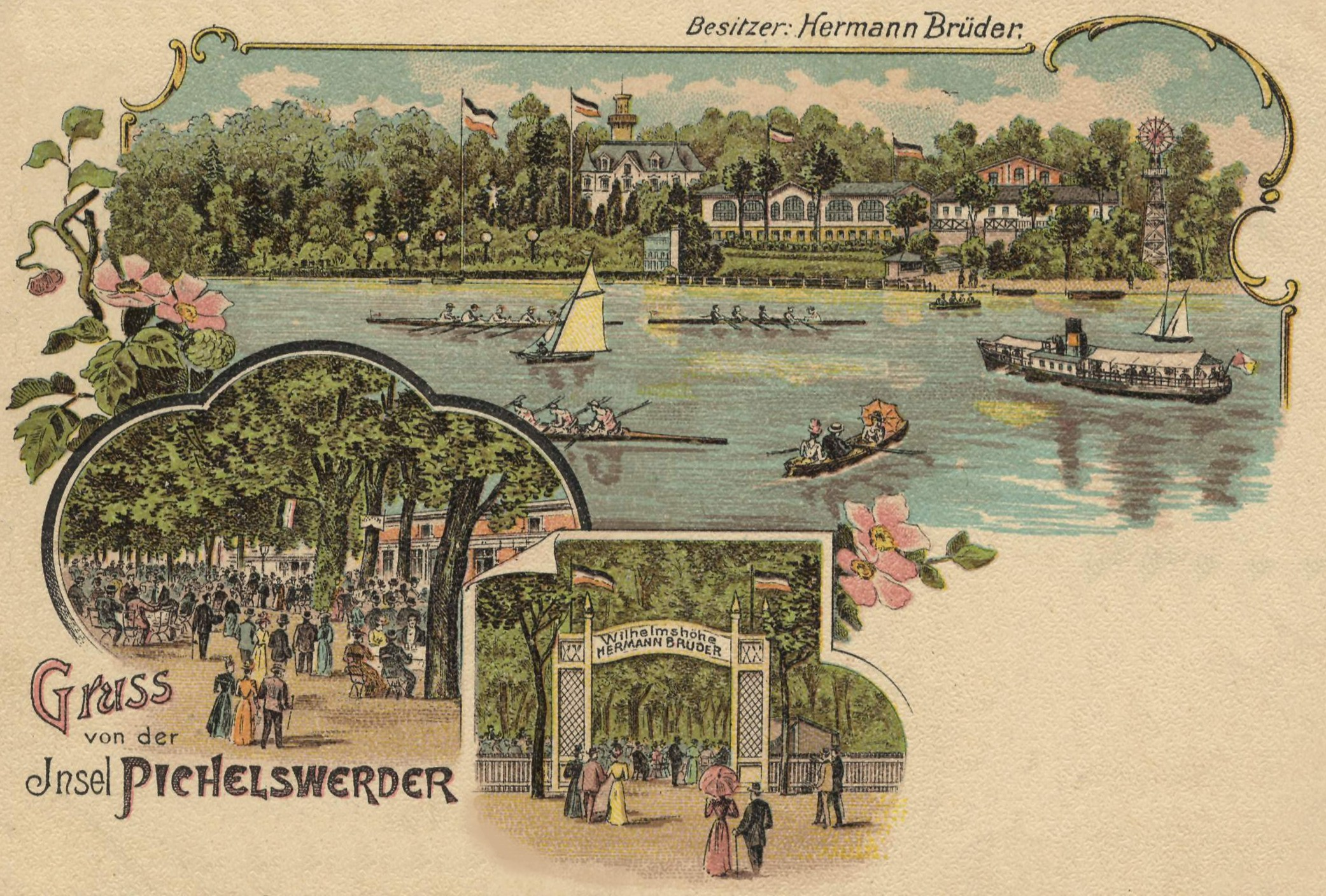
Pichelswerder on a postcard from 1906

Pichelswerder is a river island located in the Havel River within the Berlin district of Wilhelmstadt, which is part of the Spandau district.

== Location ==
Pichelswerder Island is located between Pichelssee (Lake Pichels) and Stößensee (Lake Stößensee), both of which are connected by the Havel River. The island is bordered to the north by Tiefwerder Wiesen, and to the northeast by Kleiner Jürgengraben and Hauptgraben. The interior of the island is a wooded nature reserve, characterized by the presence of old oak and pine trees. The shores of the island are primarily utilized by rowing and sailing clubs. Moreover, Pichelswerder is home to one of the twelve designated dog walking areas in Berlin, situated on both sides of the Heerstraße.

== History ==
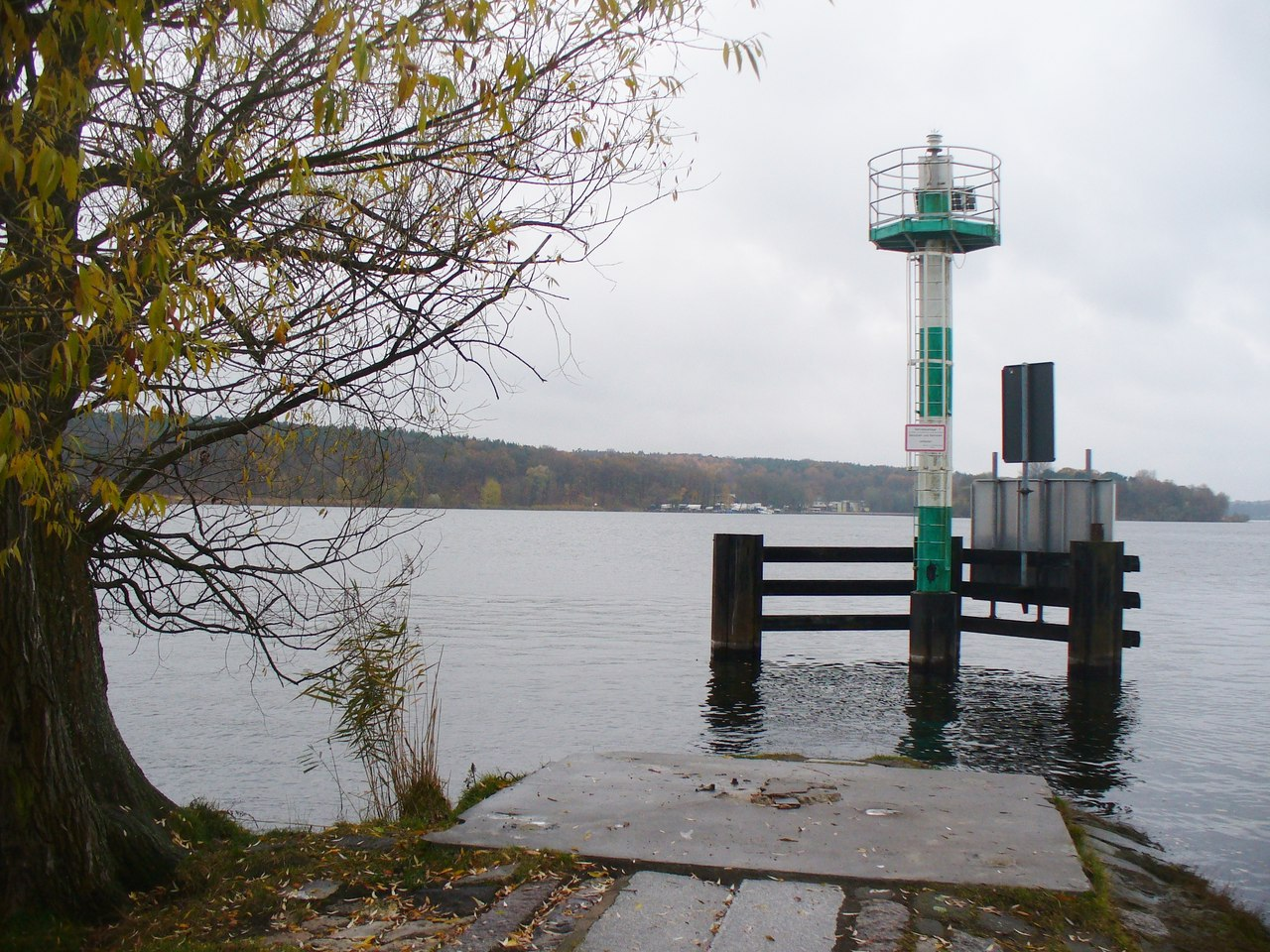
Pichelswerder - Leuchtfeuer (Navigation Lights Tower)

Pichelswerder was discovered in the middle of the 19th century by the people of Spandau and Berlin as a popular excursion destination. Several well-known excursions inns were established on the island, including Wilhelmshöhe, Königgrätzer Garten (now known as Siemenswerder), Wirtshaus zum Freund, and Wirtshaus Rackwitz. The large hall of the Rackwitz Inn later served as a film and television studio after World War II.

In 1879, an erratic boulder was discovered on Pichelswerder in a longitudinal depression running from north to south near the western locales on the Havel River. The local residents dubbed this stone the Wendischer Opferaltar (Wendish sacrificial altar). However, the erratic block on its wall base was lost around 1950.

In 1882, a pontoon bridge was built across the Stößensee, providing access to the restaurants for a "sixer." Furthermore, multiple ferries were in operation to facilitate transportation to and from Pichelswerder. With the construction of the Heerstraße between 1903 and 1911, Pichelswerder was connected to neighboring Pichelsdorf in the west through the Freybrücke (Frey Bridge) and to Charlottenburg in the east via the Stößensee Bridge.

Prior to its incorporation into Greater Berlin in 1920, Pichelswerder was an independent estate district in the district of Osthavelland. According to the 1910 census, the estate district had 39 inhabitants. Although plans were made for a Pichelswerder National Park in the 1910s and a Reichsehrenmal Pichelswerder in the 1920s, both were never realized. Additionally, the buildings for a World's Fair planned by the National Socialists for 1950 on the site were never built.

== In folklore ==
In some versions of the Schildhorn saga, Pichelswerder is depicted as the starting point of the escape of the Slav prince Jaxa von Köpenick from Albrecht the Bear through the Havel to the Schildhorn in the founding year of the Mark Brandenburg in 1157.

== See also ==
- Freybrücke
- Tiefwerder
