= Bundesautobahn 143 =

Federal motorway in Germany

A 143
- Bundesautobahn 143
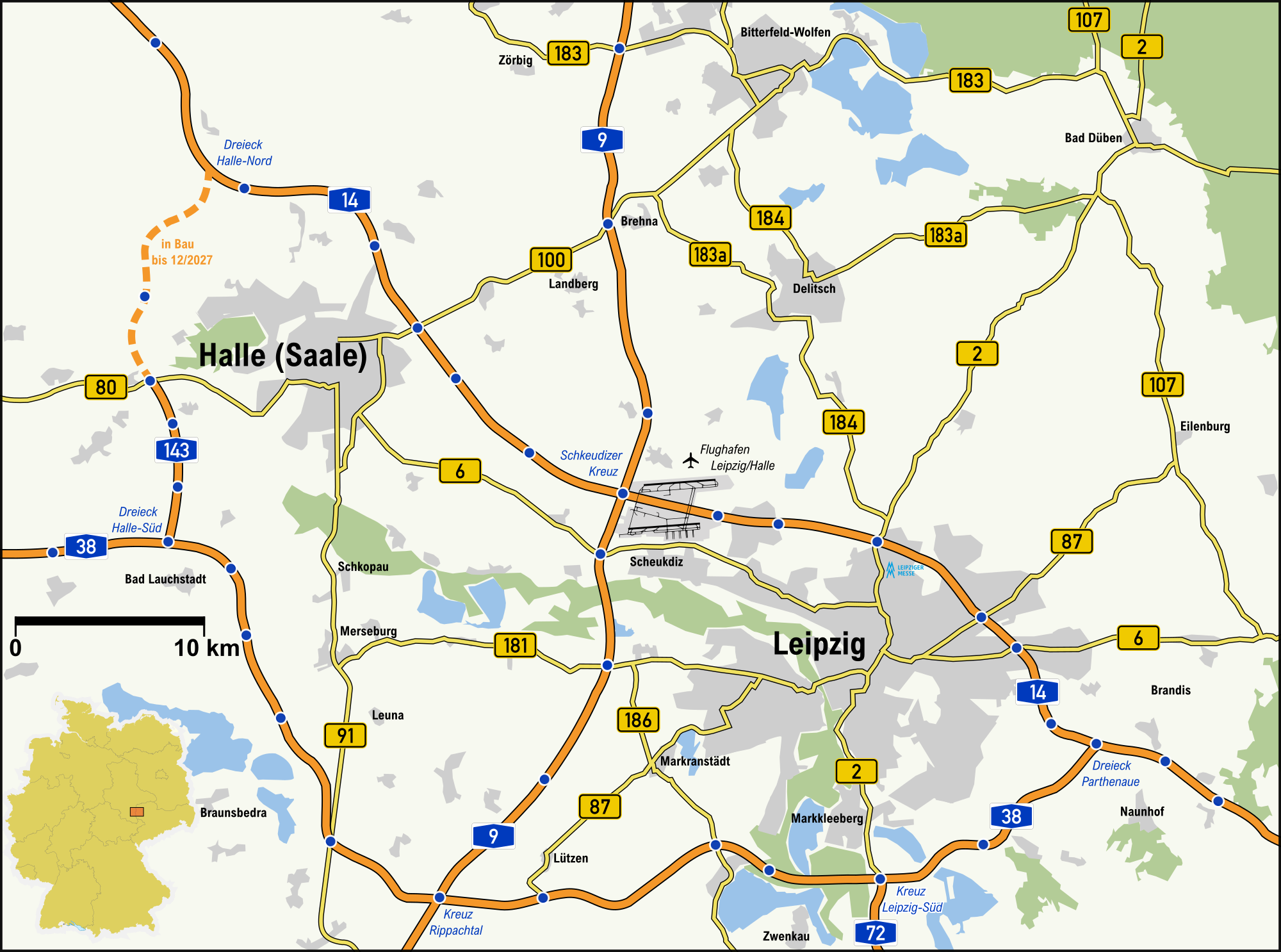

Route information
- Length: 9 km (5.6 mi)

Major junctions
- North end: Bennstedt, Saalekreis
- South end: Bad Lauchstädt, Saalekreis

Location
- Country: Germany
- States: Saxony-Anhalt

Highway system
- Roads in Germany; Autobahns; List; Federal; List; State; E-roads
← A 117	→ A 210

Bundesautobahn 143 (translates from German as Federal Motorway 143, short form Autobahn 143, abbreviated as BAB 143 or A 143) is an autobahn in Saxony-Anhalt, Germany. The A 143 comprises the western leg of the Mitteldeutsche Schleife (Central German Loop), a beltway around the cities of Halle an der Saale and Leipzig. 9 km of the planned 22 km route have been completed, due to the autobahn's path potentially disturbing an environmentally sensitive area.

== History ==
After reunification, the A 143 was one of the first projects to begin planning under the new government. The A 143 project was placed under top priority in the Bundesverkehrswegeplan (Federal Transport Infrastructure Plan) of 1992, and the original plan was for at least part of the highway to open within a year. However, the A 143's path goes through an environmentally sensitive area, part of which is protected by the Habitats Directive. The southernmost 9 km was not built and opened until July 11, 2005. Construction on the remaining 12.6 km is currently blocked from proceeding after a successful lawsuit by the Naturschutzbund Deutschland (NABU). According to the NABU, the highway threatens the habitats of great crested newts, European polecats, and some 25 different species of dragonflies. DEGES plans to meet all of NABU's concerns and restart construction by 2011, but the NABU and most local residents are still opposed to the project, and the NABU intends to continue using lawsuits to stop construction.

The 18-year delay in construction has added an estimated €70 million to the project's initial projected cost of €80 million.

== Exit list ==
Intersection		3-way interchange Halle-Nord (planned) A 14 E49
		Tunnel Porphyrkuppen 250 m (planned)
		Salzmünde 958 m (planned)
		Tunnel 207 m (planned)
		Salzmünde (planned)
		Talbrücke Benkendorfer Bach 250 m (planned)
		Rest area (planned)
		Grünbrücke (planned)
	(3)	Halle-Neustadt B 80
		Rest area Pappelgrund
	(4)	Teutschenthal
	(5)	Holleben
	(6)	Halle-Süd 3-way interchange A 38
