= Wilhelmstadt =

- Quarter of Berlin
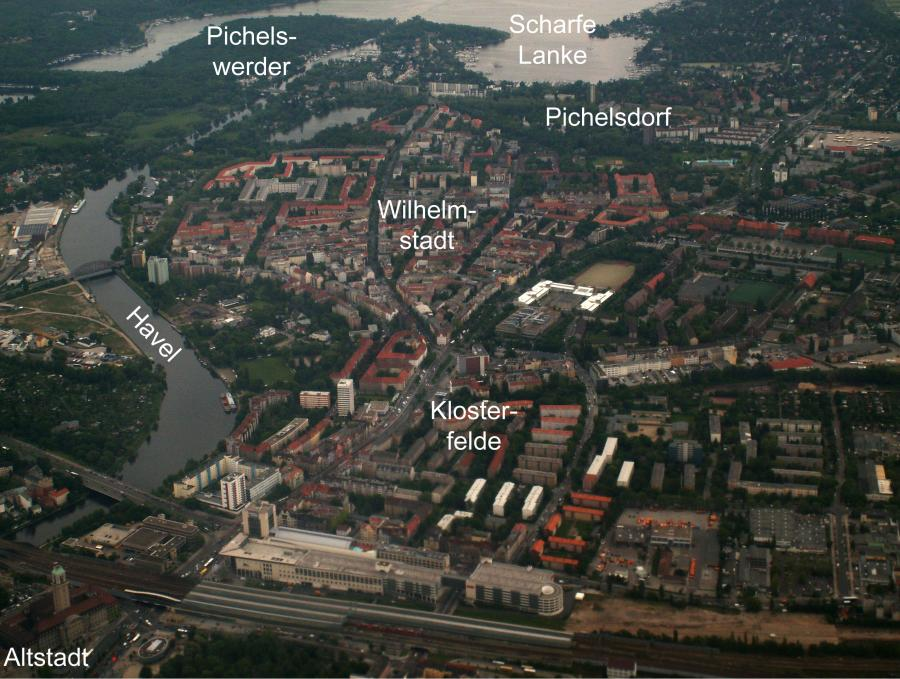
- Aerial view

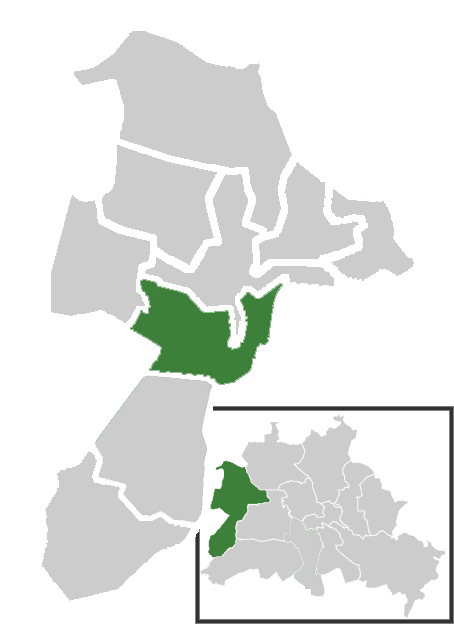
- Location of Wilhelmstadt in Spandau district and Berlin
- Interactive map of Wilhelmstadt
- Location within Germany Location within Berlin
- Coordinates: 52°31′32″N 13°10′34″E
- Country: Germany
- State: Berlin
- City: Berlin
- Borough: Spandau
- Founded: 1945
- Subdivisions: 3 zones

Area
  - Total: 10.4 km^{2} (4.0 sq mi)
- Elevation: 40 m (130 ft)

Population (2024-12-31)
  - Total: 41,250
  - Density: 3,970/km^{2} (10,300/sq mi)
- Time zone: UTC+01:00 (CET)
  - Summer (DST): UTC+02:00 (CEST)
- Postal codes: 13593, 13595
- Vehicle registration: B

Wilhelmstadt (German pronunciation: [ˈvɪlhɛlmsˌʃtat]) is a German locality (Ortsteil) of Berlin in the borough (Bezirk) of Spandau.

== History ==
In the year 1945 the allied armed forces from the Soviet Union and the United Kingdom accomplished an exchange of territory, among the area of Seeburg in Spandau. This new quarter was crossed, from 1961 to 1989 by the Berlin Wall, due to its position at the borders of West Berlin with East Germany. It became an autonomous Ortsteil in 2003, separated (with Hakenfelde and Falkenhagener Feld) from the one of Spandau.

== Geography ==
=== Overview ===
Wilhelmstadt is situated in the western suburb of Berlin, close to the central area of Spandau. It borders with the Brandenburg municipality of Dallgow-Döberitz (Havelland district) and with the localities of Staaken, Spandau, Gatow, Westend and Grunewald (both in Charlottenburg-Wilmersdorf).

Traversed by the Havel river, Wilhelmshaven counts a former floodplain named Tiefwerder Wiesen and the lakes Scharfe Lanke (German pronunciation: [ˈʃaʁfə ˈlaŋkə]), Grimnitzsee, Pichelssee, Südparkteich and part of Stößensee (German pronunciation: [ˈʃtøːsn̩ˌzeː]). The peninsula of Pichelswerder, part of its Ortslage Pichelsdorf (German pronunciation: [ˈpɪçl̩sˌdɔʁf]) borders with the Grunewald forest, and is separated from the rest of it by the Stößensee.

=== Subdivision ===
Wilhelmstadt is divided into 3 zones (Ortslagen):

- Dorf Wilhelmstadt
- Pichelsdorf
- Weinmeisterhöhe

== Transport ==
The locality is not served by urban railways but its nearest station, Berlin-Spandau (S+U-Bahn and long-distance transport), is not too far from its residential area. In a plan to expand the U-Bahn it has been projected to prolong the U7 line from the terminus "Rathaus Spandau" to Staaken, with 3 new stops in the quarter, as of Seeburger Straße, Wilhelmstadt and Heerstraße-Wilhelmstraße.

== Photogallery ==
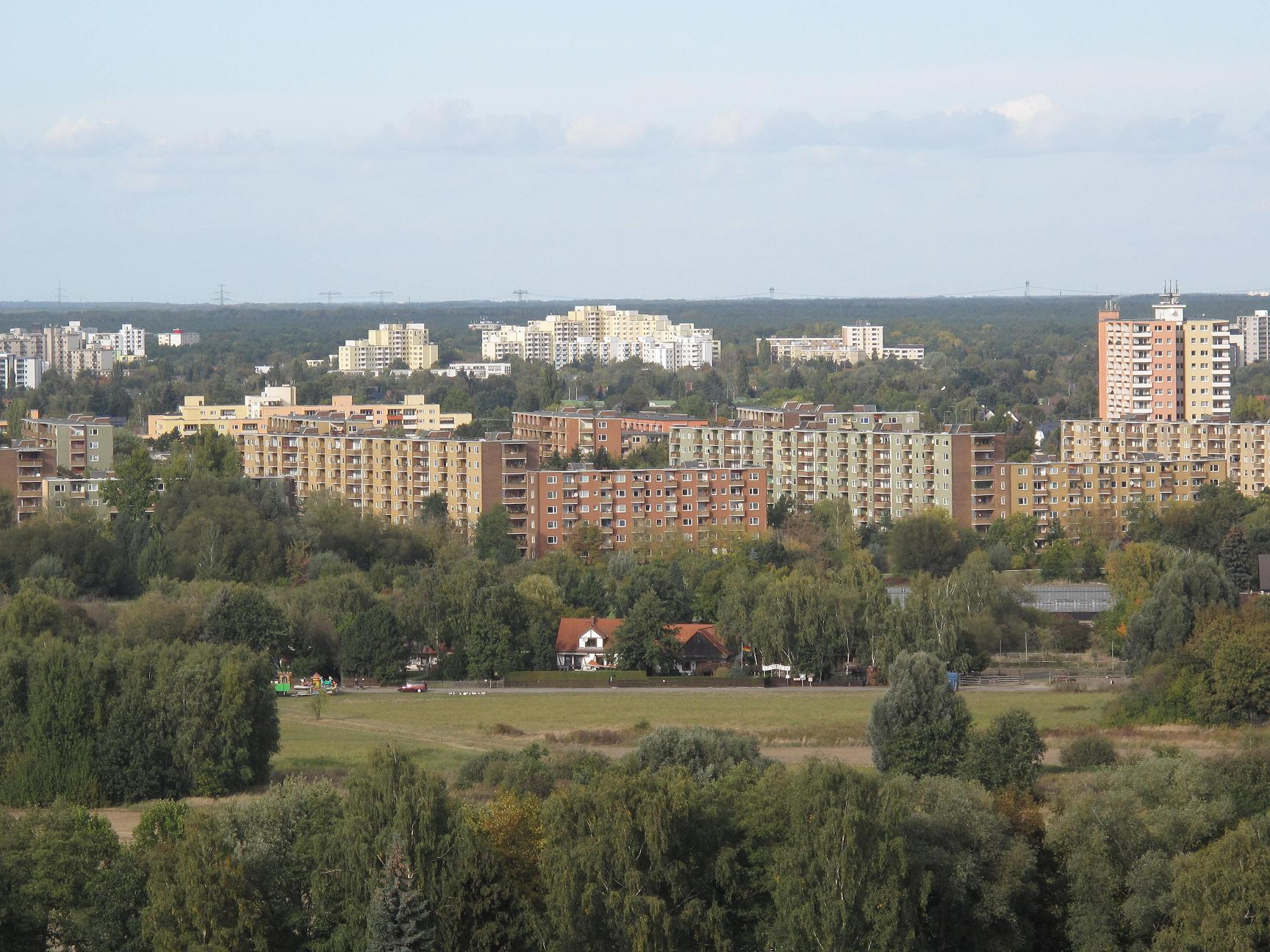
View of the Bullengraben building complex from the hill of Hahneberg

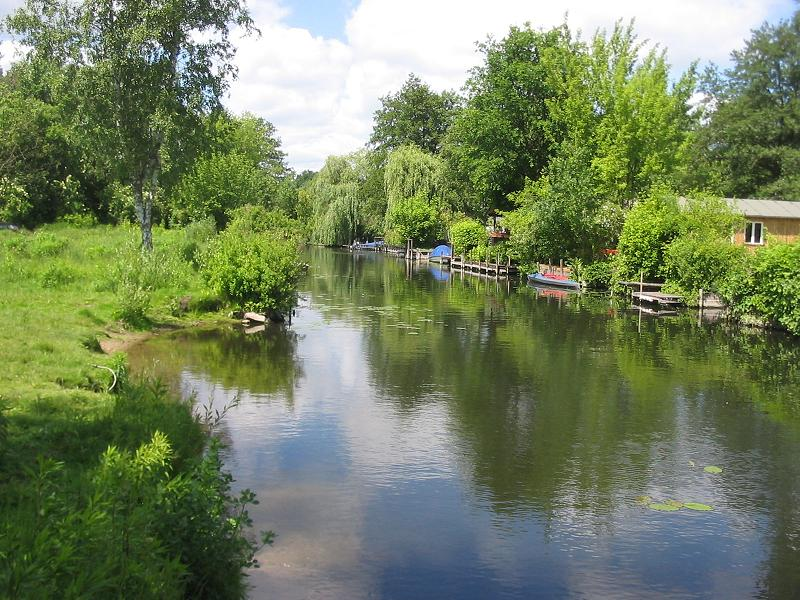
Tiefwerder Wiesen

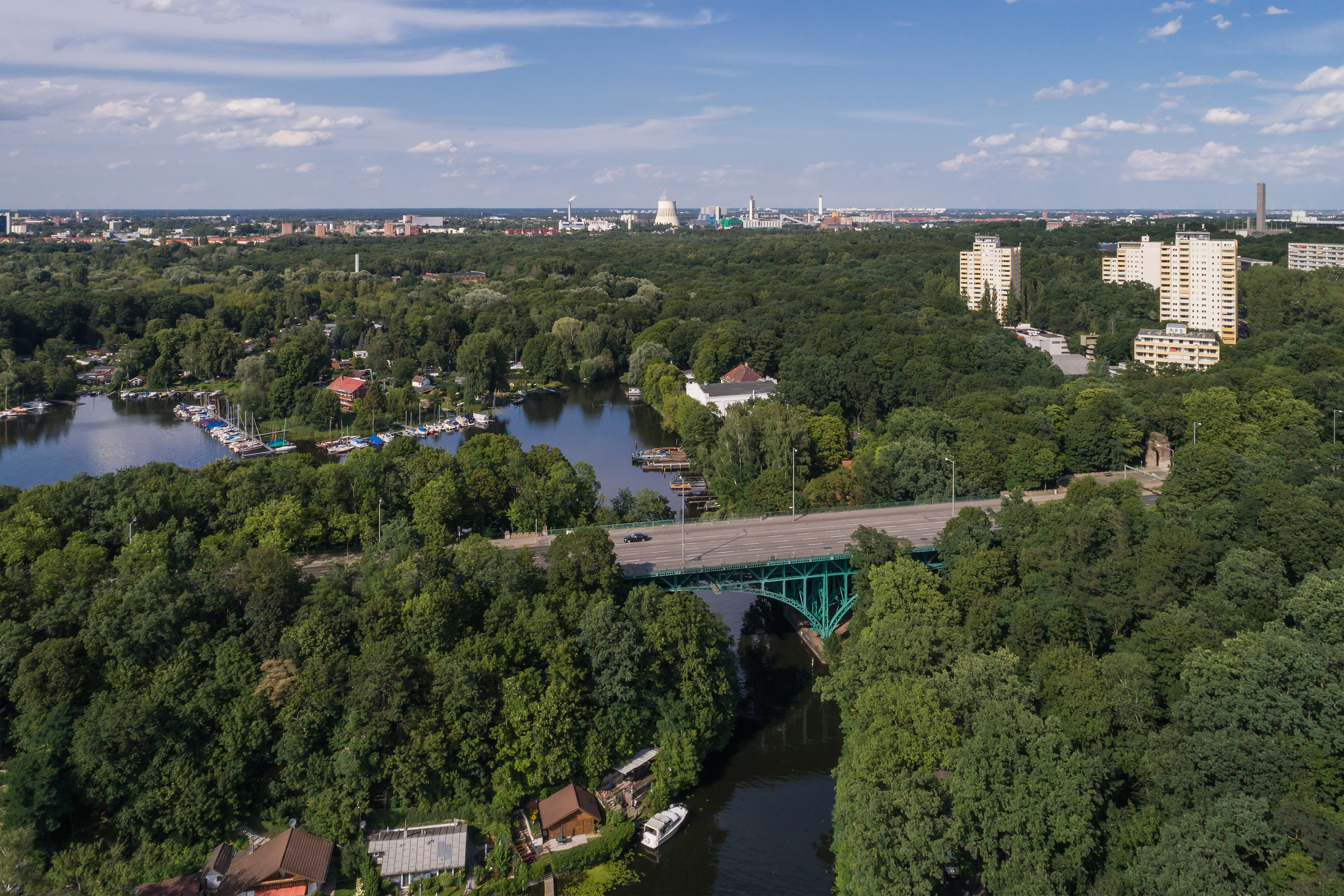
Stössensee

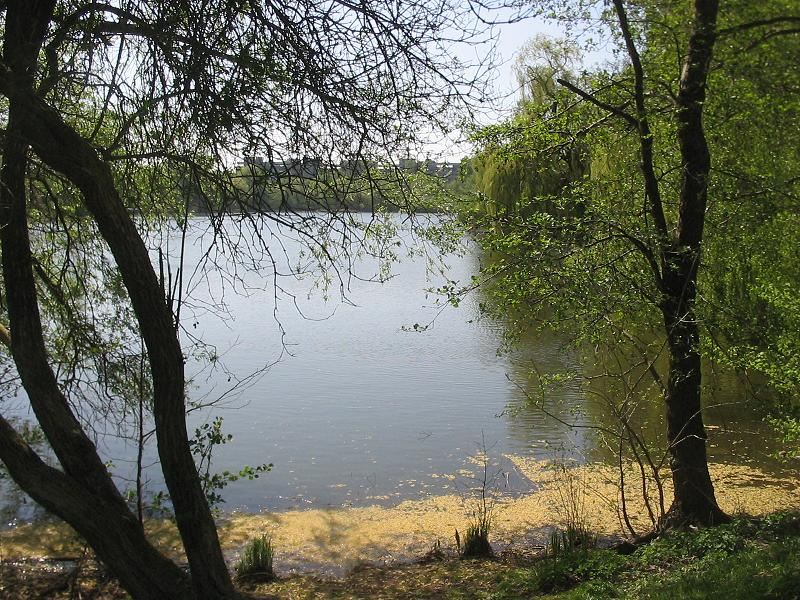
Grimnitzsee
