= DEGES =

German project management institution

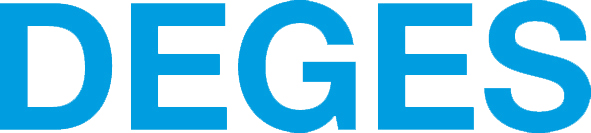
DEGES Logo

The Deutsche Einheit Fernstraßenplanungs- und -bau GmbH (DEGES) (German Unity motorway planning and construction company) is a state-owned project management institution founded on October 7, 1991, about one year after the German reunification. The intention was to support the New Länder in the planning and preparation of necessary construction work on their old and new Autobahn highways.

== Organisation ==
Participators and owners of DEGES are the Federal Republic of Germany (42,91%) as well as the federal states Brandenburg, Hamburg, Mecklenburg-Vorpommern, Saxony, Saxony-Anhalt, Schleswig-Holstein and Thuringia with 8,16% each. The company resides in Berlin, there are branches in every capital of the participating federal states. As of 2006, the company employs approximately 250 people.

== Order size ==
The company is responsible for the improvement or construction of 1200 km of Autobahn (750 km old, 450 km new) in the New Länder, as well as the City-Tunnel in Leipzig, with a total investment of approximately 9.6 billion € (as of 2006) Later has further projects throughout Germany been added to the company.
