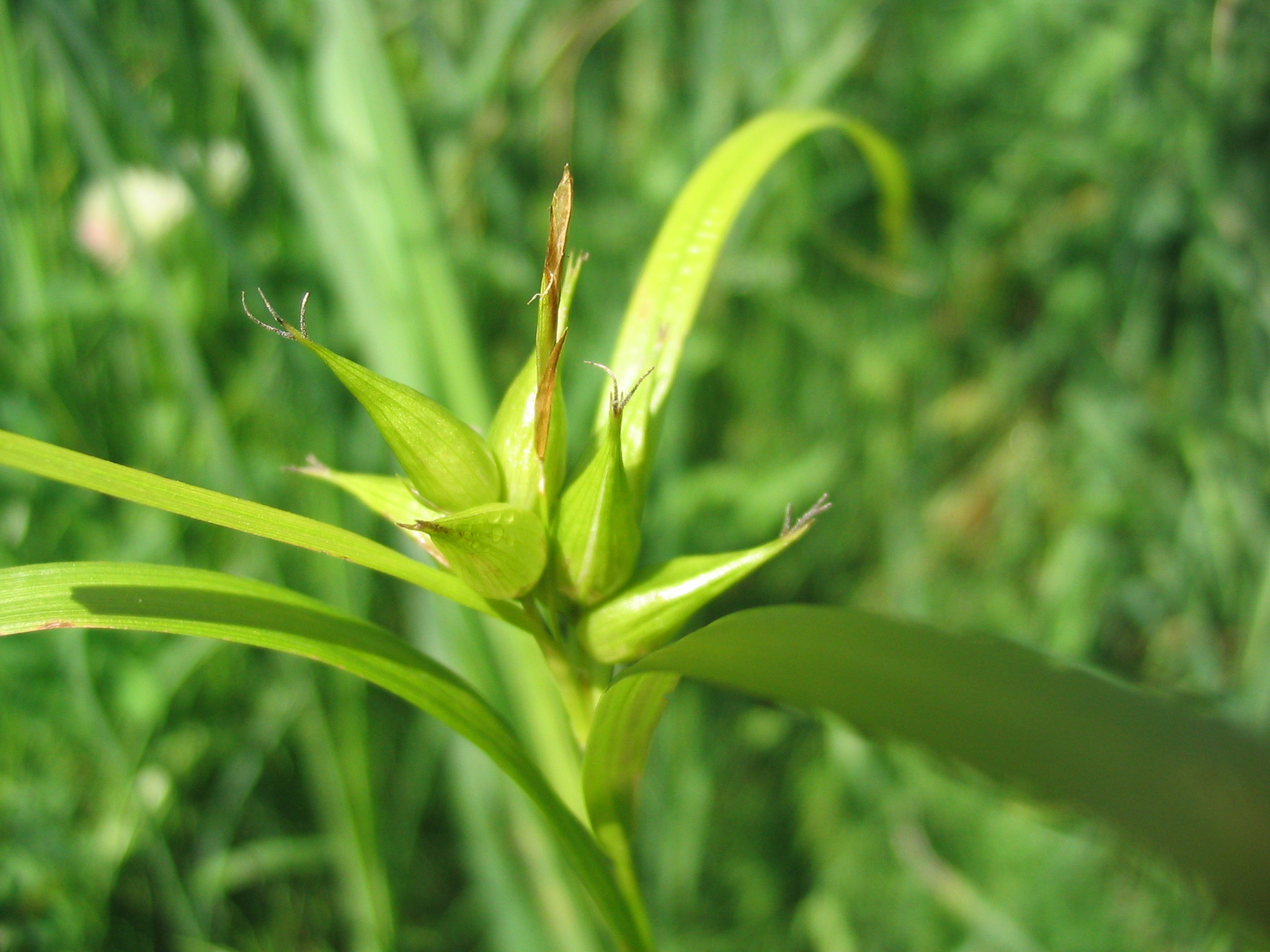

Conservation status
- Least Concern (IUCN 3.1)

Scientific classification
- Kingdom: Plantae
- Clade: Tracheophytes
- Clade: Angiosperms
- Clade: Monocots
- Clade: Commelinids
- Order: Poales
- Family: Cyperaceae
- Genus: Carex
- Species: C. intumescens

Binomial name
- Carex intumescens Rudge

= Carex intumescens =

Species of grass-like plant

Carex intumescens, also known as bladder sedge, is a species of Carex native to Canada and the eastern United States.
