= Freybrücke =

Road bridge over the Havel in Berlin

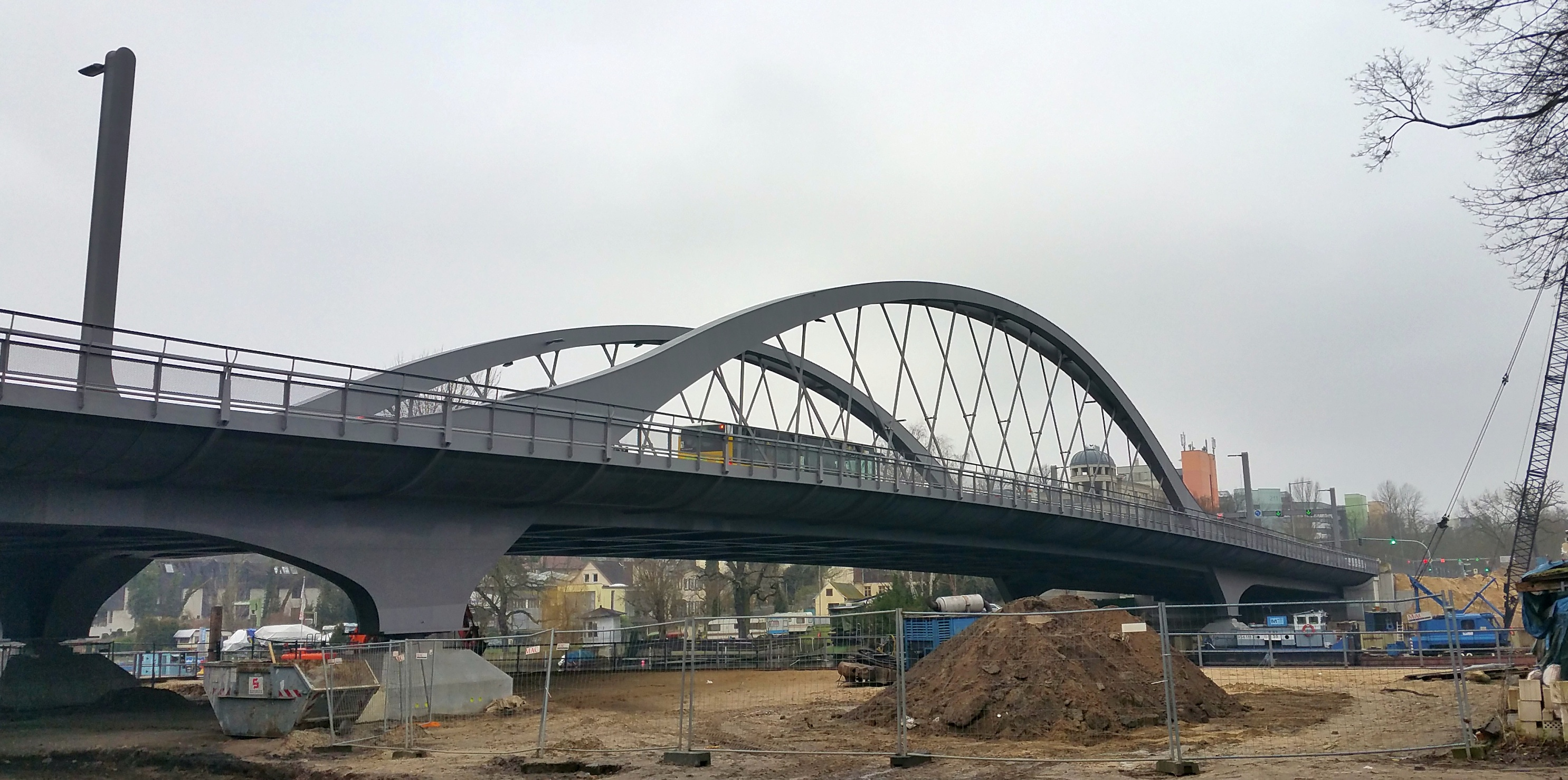
- Construction work on the new Freybrücke, as of January 2018
- Coordinates: 52°30′42″N 13°12′11″E
- Crosses: Havel, Havelseenweg of the Tiefwerder Wiesen
- Locale: Berlin-Wilhelmstadt
- Official name: Freybrücke ( Frey Bridge)

Characteristics
- Total length: 157.90m
- Width: 24.50m
- Height: 5.25m above sea level BWo

History
- Construction start: 2015
- Construction end: December 2017, traffic release: December 20, 2016
- Construction cost: €33 million

Statistics
- Daily traffic: 60,000 vehicles per day

Location
- Interactive map of Freybrücke

The Freybrücke (lit. English: Frey Bridge) is an arch bridge located in the Wilhelmstadt district of the Berlin borough of Spandau. It carries Heerstraße (federal road 2/5) over the Havel and Havelseenweg, connecting Pichelsdorf with the Pichelswerder peninsula. The structure spanning 157.90 meters, serves about 60,000 motorists daily.

The original road bridge, measuring 174 meters in length, was built in 1908-1909 based on plans by civil engineer Karl Bernhard. Despite being designated as a listed structure, this older bridge was demolished due to significant damage, driven by economic considerations as of 2014. The new bridge, retaining the same name, was inaugurated in December 2016.

Initially referred to as the Havelbrücke (Havel bridge), the bridge was renamed Freybrücke in 1913 by a decision of the Osthavelland district. This renaming was intended to pay tribute to the "meritorious leader" of the construction of the Döberitzer Heerstraße (today known as Heerstraße), the Geheime Oberbaurat Adolf Frey.

== Part of the Heerstraße project ==
=== Döberitzer Heerstraße and development of the Pichelswerder ===
Freybrücke was part of the overall project Döberitzer Heerstraße, which was built between 1903 and 1911 as an extension of the Kaiserdamm as a direct connection from the Berlin Palace via the cities of Charlottenburg and Spandau, which were independent until their incorporation into Greater Berlin in 1920, to the military training area Döberitz. The east-west roadway encompasses present-day roads such as Unter den Linden, Straße des 17. Juni, Bismarckstraße, Kaiserdamm, Heerstraße, and, upon exiting the Berlin city limits, Hamburger Chaussee in Dallgow-Döberitz.

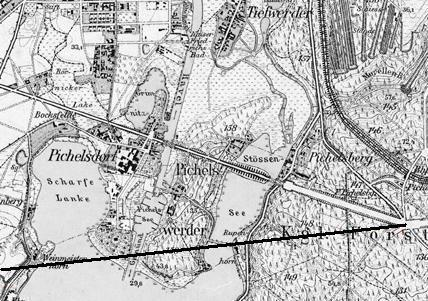
Guide of the Heerstraße through the Havel lowlands with a kink at Scholzplatz on a map from around 1910. The lower black line shows the design line (according to Karl Bernhard ) with a dead straight continuation without a kink, which would also have required the Scharfe Lanke to be bridged.

At the time of its construction, the bridge site fell within the jurisdiction of the Osthavelland district. While the military, financial, and forestry treasury, along with Berlin, Charlottenburg, Spandau, the Teltow district, the Osthavelland district, and various municipalities, all contributed financially to the overall project, the primary funding for the bridge lay largely with the forestry treasury, which the Berlin Monument Database indicates as the builder of the bridge.

The road, built for military reasons, was public from the beginning and made the western Grunewald and Pichelswerder accessible to the broad Berlin and Spandau excursion traffic. Pichelswerder, in particular, had long exerted a great attraction on Berliners. Thus, as early as 1806, when Johann Christian Gädicke described the "Pichelsdorfsche Werder, im Havelländischen Kreise, bei Spandau" in the Lexicon von Berlin und der umliegenden Gegend, stating: "This area is a popular destination for leisure and is considered one of the most beautiful areas surrounding Berlin".

=== Bridging the Havel lowlands and costs ===
The most significant technical and financial challenge in road construction was the bridging of the Havel lowlands at the northwestern foothills of the Teltow plateau. Among several variants, including an additional 250-meter-long bridge over the Scharfe Lanke (with a straight continuation of the Heerstraße at the Scholzplatz), the planners opted for a slight bend in the Heerstraße to the northwest and thus for a routing that managed with two bridges. The neighboring Stößensee Bridge, about 800 meters to the east, spans the Stößensee, an old arm of the Havel River. A dam, around 450 meters long was built in the lake from Pichelswerder, reducing the length of the Stößensee bridge to 100 meters. The 174-meter-long Freybrücke crosses the Havel River, which was canalized in this area in 1880/1881, as well as the Havelseenweg, a pedestrian and bicycle path leading from Pichelswerder between the river and the Tiefwerder Wiesen to the village of Tiefwerder. While the most expensive variant for bridging the Havel lowlands involved the large bridge over the Scharfe Lanke, with an estimated expense of 16.9 million marks, the implemented solution cost a comparatively low sum of 2.54 million marks. Freybrücke accounted for 1.14 million marks (adjusted for purchasing power in today's currency: around 7 million euros).

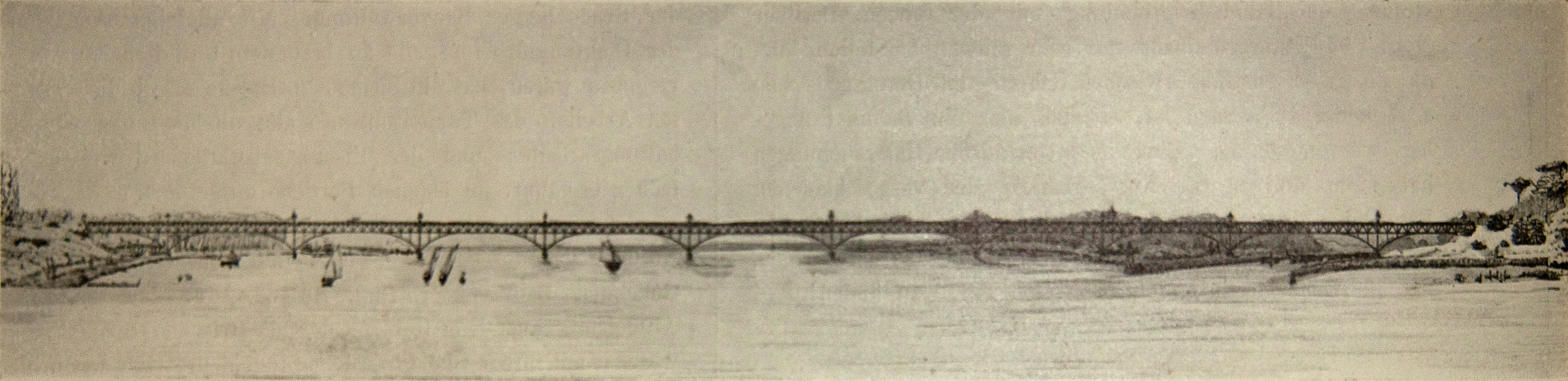
Project sketch by Karl Bernhard with bridging of the Scharfe Lanke and the Havel (right) with the Heerstraße continuing straight as a die at Scholzplatz

== First bridge ==
=== Bernhard's aesthetic steel construction without architects ===
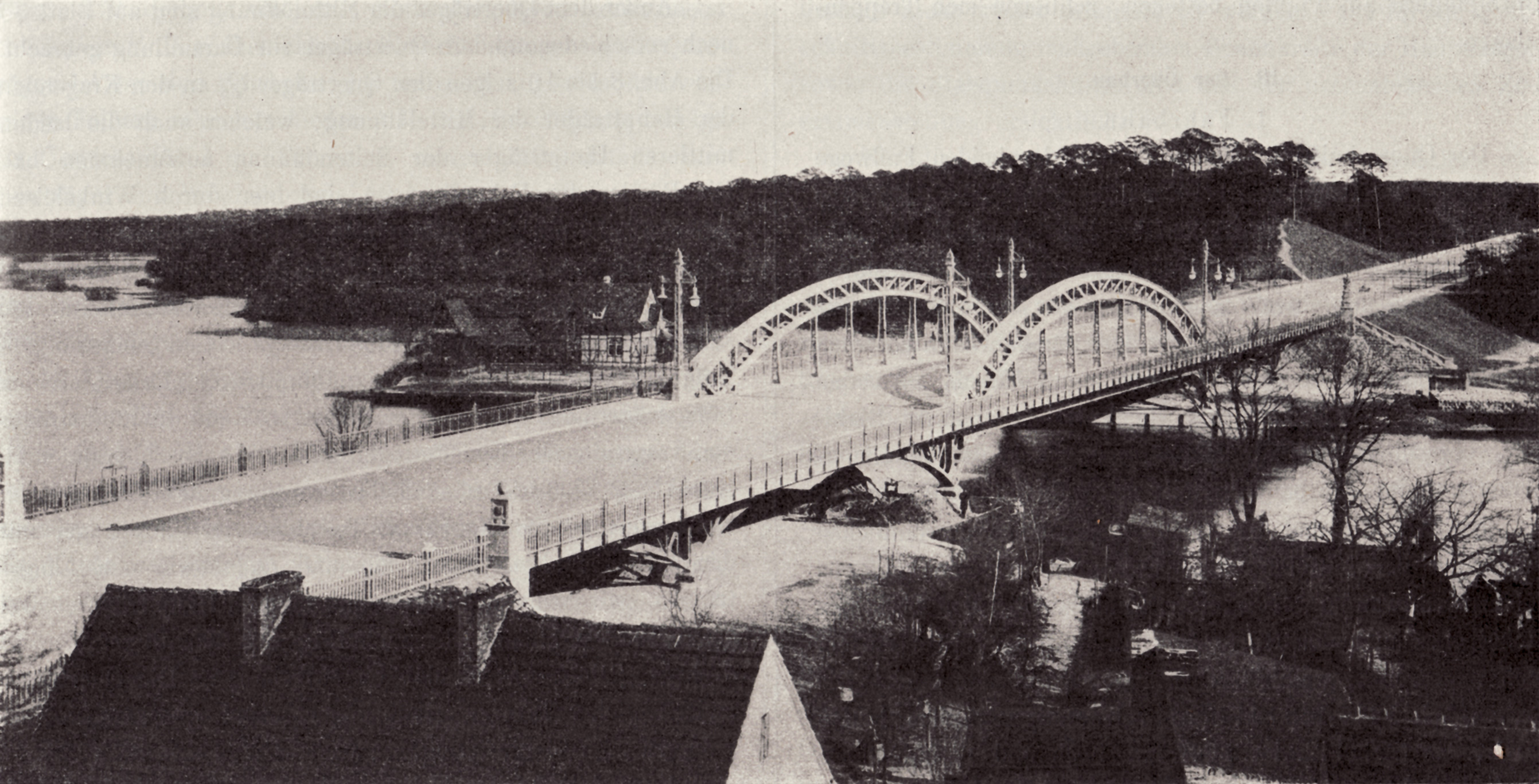
The structure, still known as the Havel Bridge at the time, after its completion in 1909

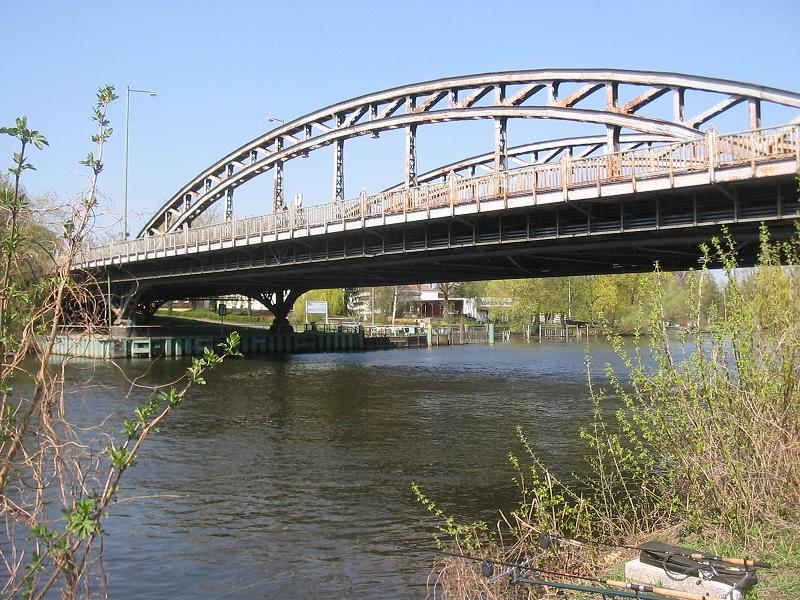
The old bridge in 2009

Drawn by inspiration from the Parisian road bridges during his visit to the 1900 World's Fair, Karl Bernhard went on designing 'pleasing iron bridges without architects,' whose lines were to be achieved only 'through the interplay of static and aesthetic considerations.' In 1903, for the Treskow Bridge, he developed a truss arch featuring a tension band and suspended central span. This innovative approach composed the load-bearing elements of the bridge, utilizing iron girders beneath the side arches. Bernhard employed this same structural system for both the Stubenrauchbrücke (Stubenrauch Bridge) and the Freybrücke. However, for the neighboring Stößenseebrücke (Stößensee Bridge), Kaiser Wilhelm II opted for a distinct system—cantilever girders with appended towed girders—choosing an alternative over Bernhard's proposals. With the Freybrücke, Bernhard further developed the concept of the Treskow Bridge:

"If there is a question of the connection of floor girders above the carriageway of the central opening with girders lying below the carriageway, here there are five openings in such a way that on both sides of the floor girders of the central main opening, there are two side openings each with corresponding girders. The wide-span arches of the central opening alone project above the roadway, while the main girders of all four side openings lie below the roadway, giving the entire bridge appearance a characteristic emphasizing the river opening."

— Karl Bernhard: Stossensee and Havel Bridge as part of the Döberitzer Heerstraße. 1911

=== Construction ===
==== Pillars ====
Originally, the plan involved spanning only the Havel with a 65-meter bridge, while the lateral peat masses were to be shifted through sand fills. However, the fears arose that the fills could remain in motion for a long time and endanger the stability of the piers. The bridge was extended over the banks on both sides until a load-bearing foundation soil was achieved for the embankment fill and end piers. In the bank area, the thickness of the bog layers reached up to eight meters, while at the chosen location of the end piers, it was only around 1.25 to 2 meters thick. This resulted in a central opening of 63 meters and two land openings of 31.5 and 18.9 meters, yielding a total bridge length of 163.8 meters.

The bank piers support the two main beams of the central opening, and due to their considerable spacing, each consists of two single piers. The piers located between the bank and end piers carry four supports and, accordingly consist of four individual piers. These piers rest on a coherent foundation body. Additionally, staircases are attached to each of the four end piers. All piers are founded by air pressure and were executed by Philipp Holzmann & Co. of Frankfurt am Main.

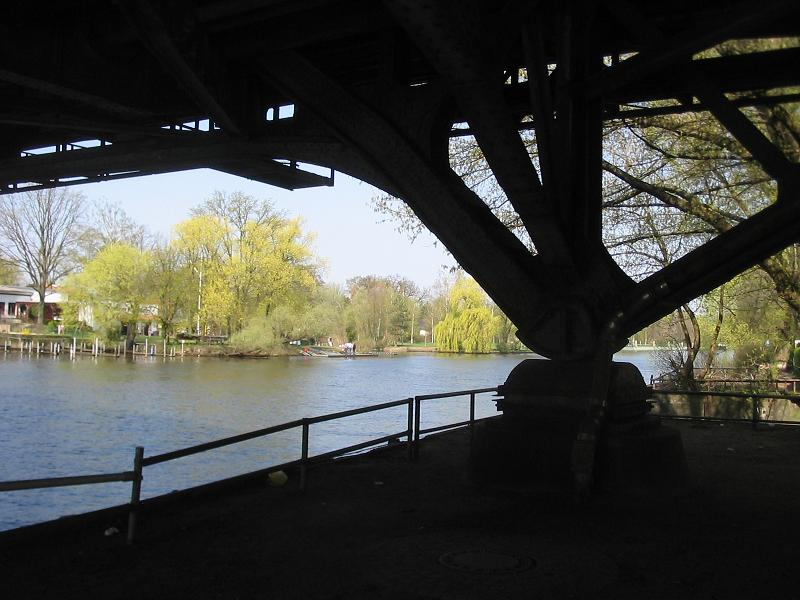
Shore pillar, 2009

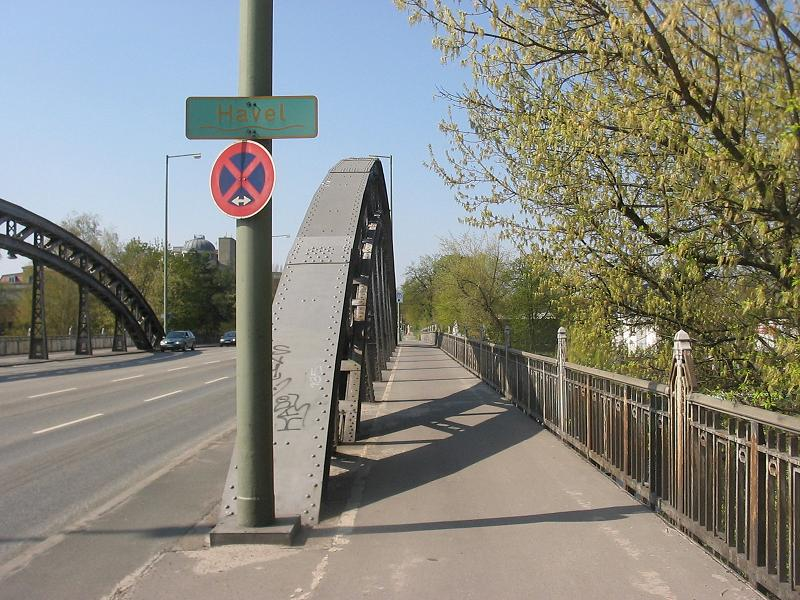
Roadway and the two main girders spanning 63 meters, 2009

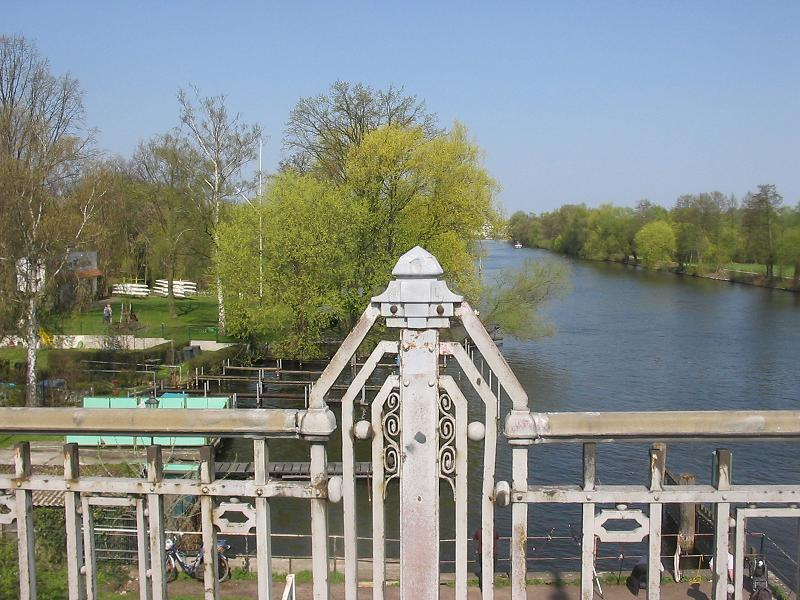
View from the Frey Bridge to the Havel and the Tiefwerder Wiesen (right)

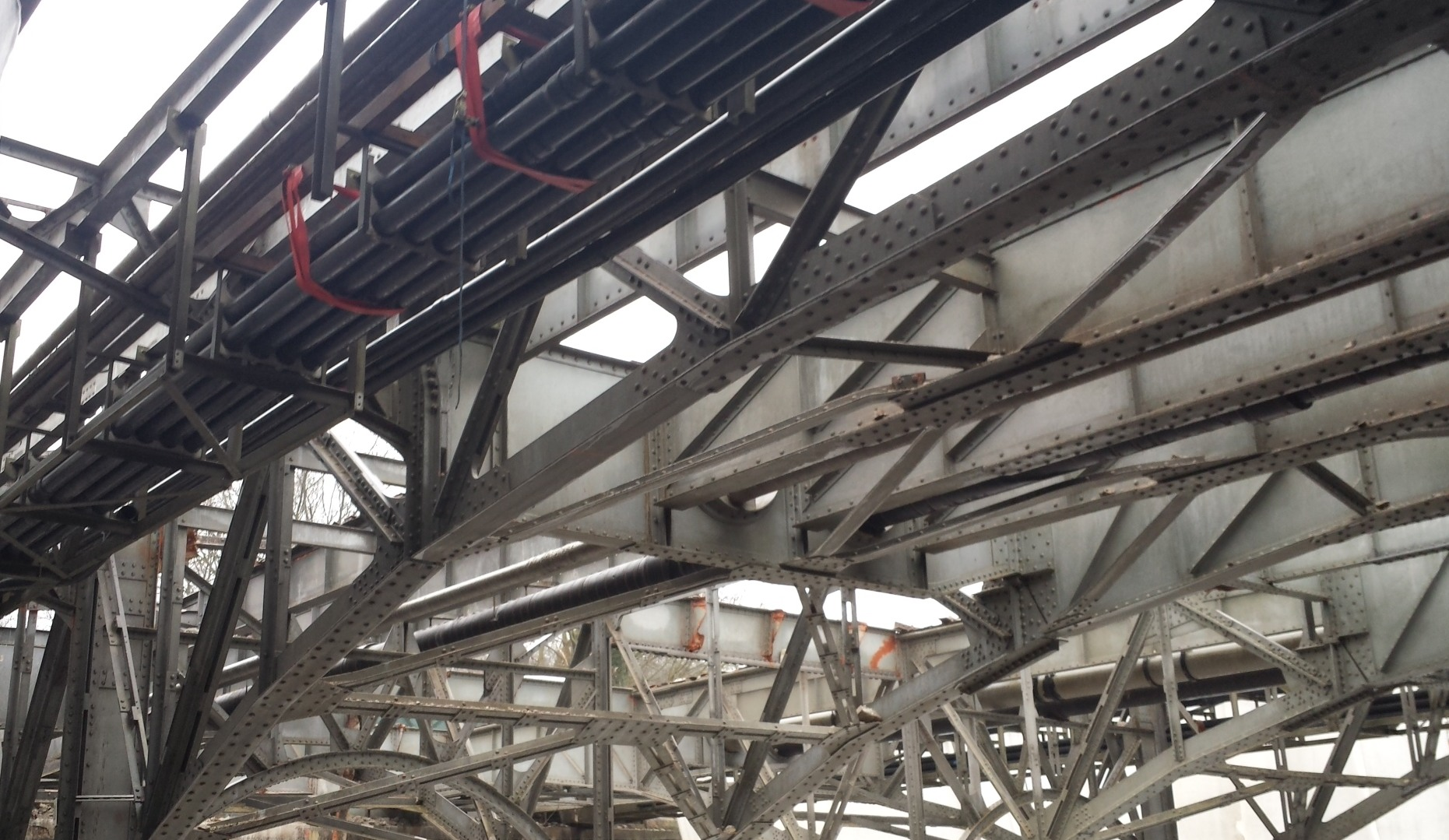
supporting structure during demolition

==== Supporting structure and superstructure ====
During high water, a clearance of four meters needed to be maintained for Havel shipping. This prevented the arrangement of the 63-meter-wide main girders under the bridge. As a result, the main girders were placed on either side of the 16-meter-wide roadway, resulting in a main girder spacing of 17.60 meters, which was unusual for the time. In the side openings, the supporting structure lies below the roadway. The arrangement was made in such a way as to allow the future construction of riverside roads. The upper edge of the carriageway at the center of the bridge was 37.427 meters above sea level, while the lower edge of the structure was 35.25 meters above sea level. The bridge had a one-sided slope of 1:270, which had to be increased to 1:50 from the riverbank to reach the base of the ramp. The Heerstraße does not cross the Havel at right angles, and since the piers were nevertheless to be parallel to the bank, the two main girders of the central opening were adjusted by 2.48 meters in the longitudinal direction of the bridge. This gave the cantilevers on the main girders varying lengths.

The thrust of the two-hinged arch above the central opening is taken up by a tension band that engages the first node of the bottom chord. The arch stands at a height of 4.35 meters above the two supports and 1.60 meters in the center. The arrow height of the bottom chord measures 10.57 meters. The spans of the openings are: end openings 18.90, side openings 32.74 as well as 30.26, and center opening 63 meters. The truss arches within the central opening are filled with a post-truss design, while the main beams of the side openings and cantilevers utilize a strut truss configuration.

A crane with a span of 26 meters and a clearance height of 11 meters was used to erect the 1600-ton superstructure. The process involved two electrically operated trolleys, each with a load capacity of twelve tons for lifting and moving the structural members. The building materials and iron parts were transported to the construction site by the river and driven to the scaffold using light rail cars. The erection took six months and was carried out by the Berlin company Steffens & Nölle.

==== Destruction in the Second World War and reconstruction ====
During World War II, the bridge suffered significant destruction when it was blown up at the southeastern pier adjacent to the Havel River. This caused the bridge's main span to collapse into the Havel River, with the two adjacent edge spans also sustaining severe damage. Additionally, the bridge's foundation suffered irreparable preliminary damage. The 1945 demolition is believed to have been carried out by the German Wehrmacht to impede the advance of Soviet troops towards Berlin.

The process of reconstruction occurred between 1948 and 1951, during which major elements of the original structure were largely removed, refurbished, and then predominantly reutilized.

== Demolition of the old bridge and temporary bridges ==
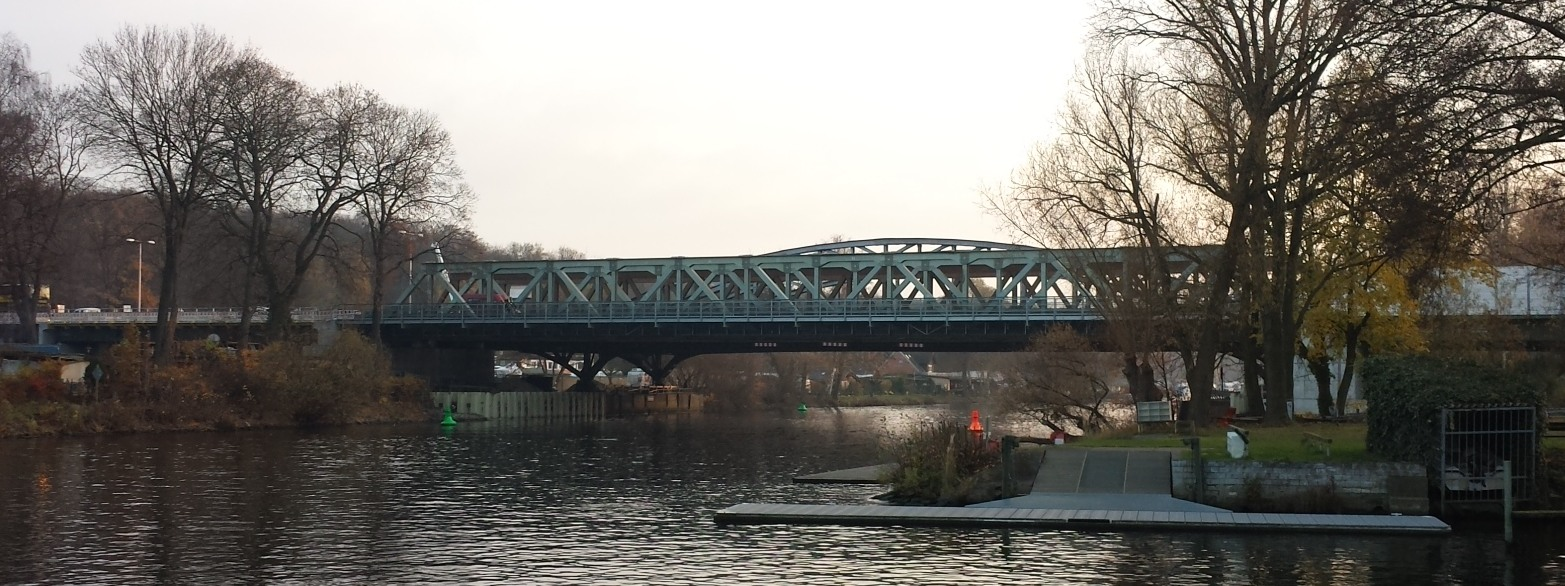
Temporary bridges with the Frey Bridge in the background, November 2014

In 2008, significant corrosion damage was found on the longitudinal and transverse girders. Consequently, the bridge was only passable at 30 km/h, and vehicles with weights over 3.5 tons had to use the right lane. Since January 13, 2014, the bridge has also closed to trucks and buses weighing 18 tons or more (initially reduced to 10 tons). This also affected articulated and double-decker buses in regular service. For economic reasons, the bridge was not to be repaired but replaced with a new structure.

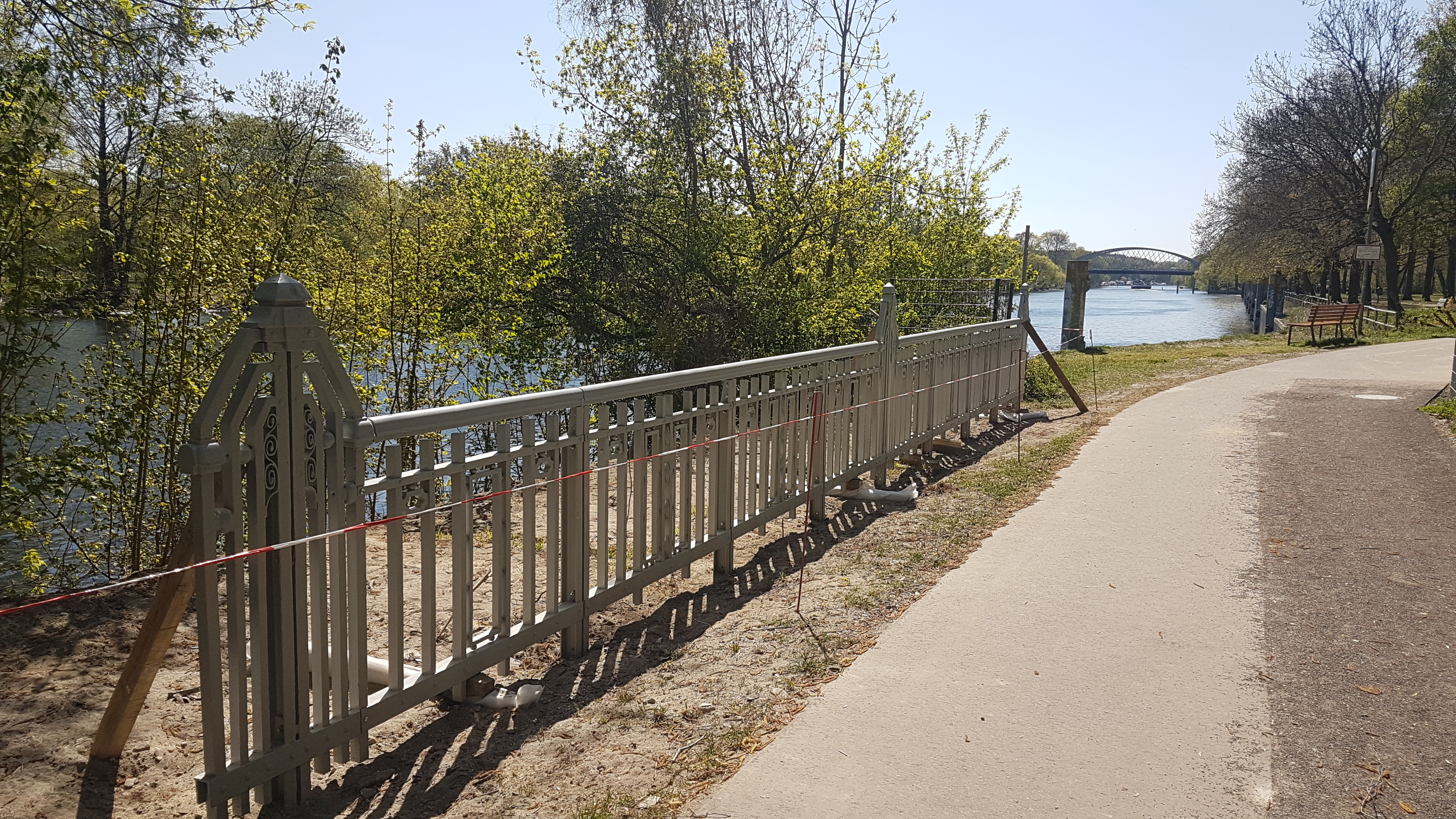
Former bridge railing Freybrücke in Grimnitzpark, 2020

On September 1, 2014, the northern, two-lane temporary bridge was opened for traffic in the direction of Spandau, while traffic in the direction of the city center initially continued to run on the old bridge. This relief of the old structure allowed regular traffic to resume without restriction. Meanwhile, a closure persisted for other vehicular traffic headed toward the city center until the southern temporary bridge opened on October 13, 2014.

The dismantling of the old bridge commenced in mid-December 2014. The final phase of demolition began on March 18, 2015, when the bridge was supported by two pontoons and cut into smaller segments on-site using two mobile cranes. This required the temporary closure of the Havel River for three days, with car traffic being unaffected.

Parts of the bridge railing are set to be used along the nearby lakeside path in Grimnitzseepark by the Havel.

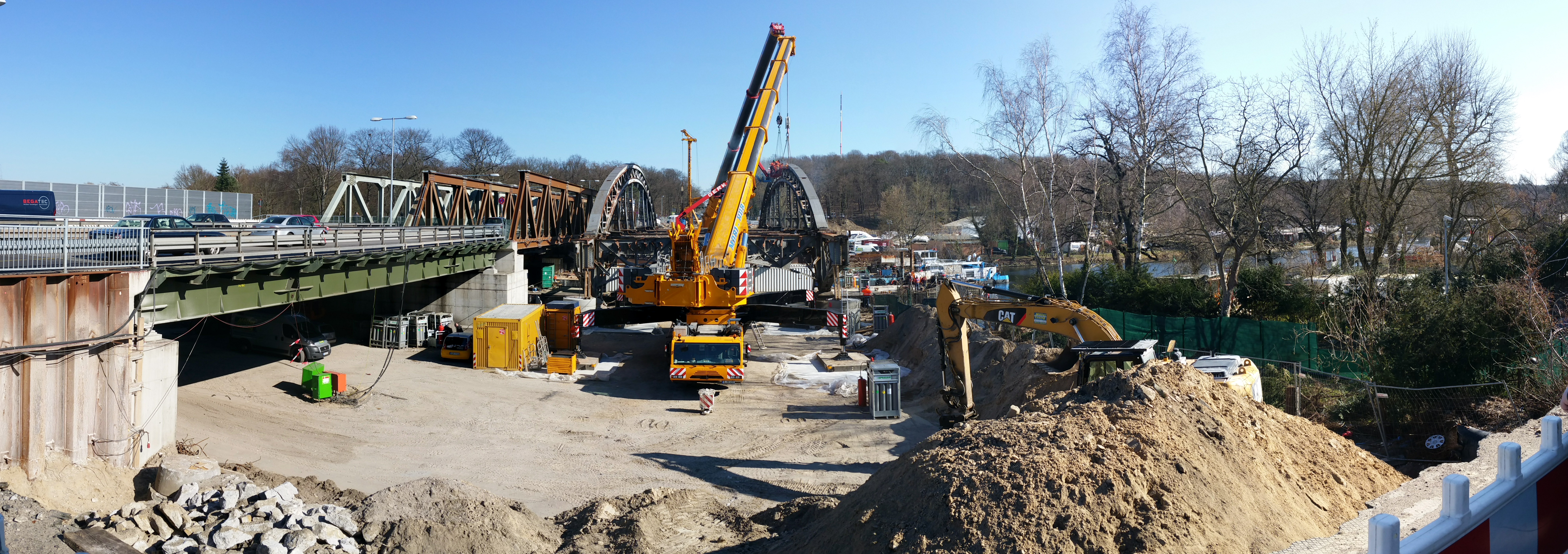
Demolition work on the old Freibrücke, March 18, 2015

== Replacement crossing ==
=== Planning within the framework of the German Unity Transport Project ===
A replacement for the Freybrücke had been planned for a significant duration, regardless of its condition. To illustrate, as part of the German Unity Transport Project No. 17, the objective was to facilitate the passage of double-layer container ships, necessitating a clearance of approximately 5.25 meters above the upper operational water level. However, due to the inadequate height of the bridge and the necessity to widen the navigation opening, it was planned for demolition and reconstruction, alongside other bridges. Nonetheless, further implementation of the project encountered a temporary suspension. The transportation project faced controversy primarily due to ecological concerns. For instance, its execution would significantly impact the water level dynamics of the Tiefwerder Wiesen, Berlin's last remaining natural floodplain and a critical spawning area for pike fish, located downstream from the Freybrücke. Additionally, substantial portions of the Havel biotope network would be adversely affected. Environmental associations and Bündnis 90/Die Grünen, a political party, criticized the expansion plans.

=== Construction data of the new bridge ===
On August 9, 2010, the new replacement bridge was approved and the associated zoning decision was officially announced. The design for the new bridge included a 48cm elevation compared to the previous one; however, the widening of the waterway below was no longer planned. Before the old bridge was dismantled, two temporary bridges of type SS80, each with two lanes and a length of 143 meters, were built to the north of it. The projected duration of the construction phase was approximately three years. Subsequently, on January 19, 2012, the invitation to tender for the construction contract was issued. The construction contract was awarded during the fourth quarter of 2012, and preliminary construction measures began at the start of 2013. On May 16, 2013, the official start of the project was announced. The construction costs were estimated at around 33 million euros, with the Federal Trunk Road Authority contributing around 16.2 million euros, and the State of Berlin providing around 11.4 million euros. The new bridge was built as a steel composite structure boasting a total length of 157.90 meters and a width between the railings measuring 24.00 meters. The passage height under the bridge has been increased to 5.25 meters in connection with the German Unity Transport Project No. 17.

=== Assembly and opening ===
The construction of the new bridge involved pre-assembly at the southern port of Spandau and transportation to its destination via pontoons on the Havel River after the demolition of the old bridge. In September 2015, the components for the pre-bridge arrived by truck, as delivery by ship was not possible due to low water levels. The pre-bridge was assembled on site from October 10, 2015. The arches that linked the riverbanks were reconnected to the banks on April 16, 2016. Another crucial step occurred on June 3, 2016, when the 400-ton center section, known as the Stromfeld, was transported from the upper harbor of the southern harbor north of the Schulenburgbrücke to the Freybrücke and then lifted into place. On June 4, welding began to anchor the lifted center section of the bridge. On both days, the Havel was closed to traffic in this section. Initially, traffic clearance was targeted for November 1, 2016, but weather conditions prevented the final asphalt and marking work.

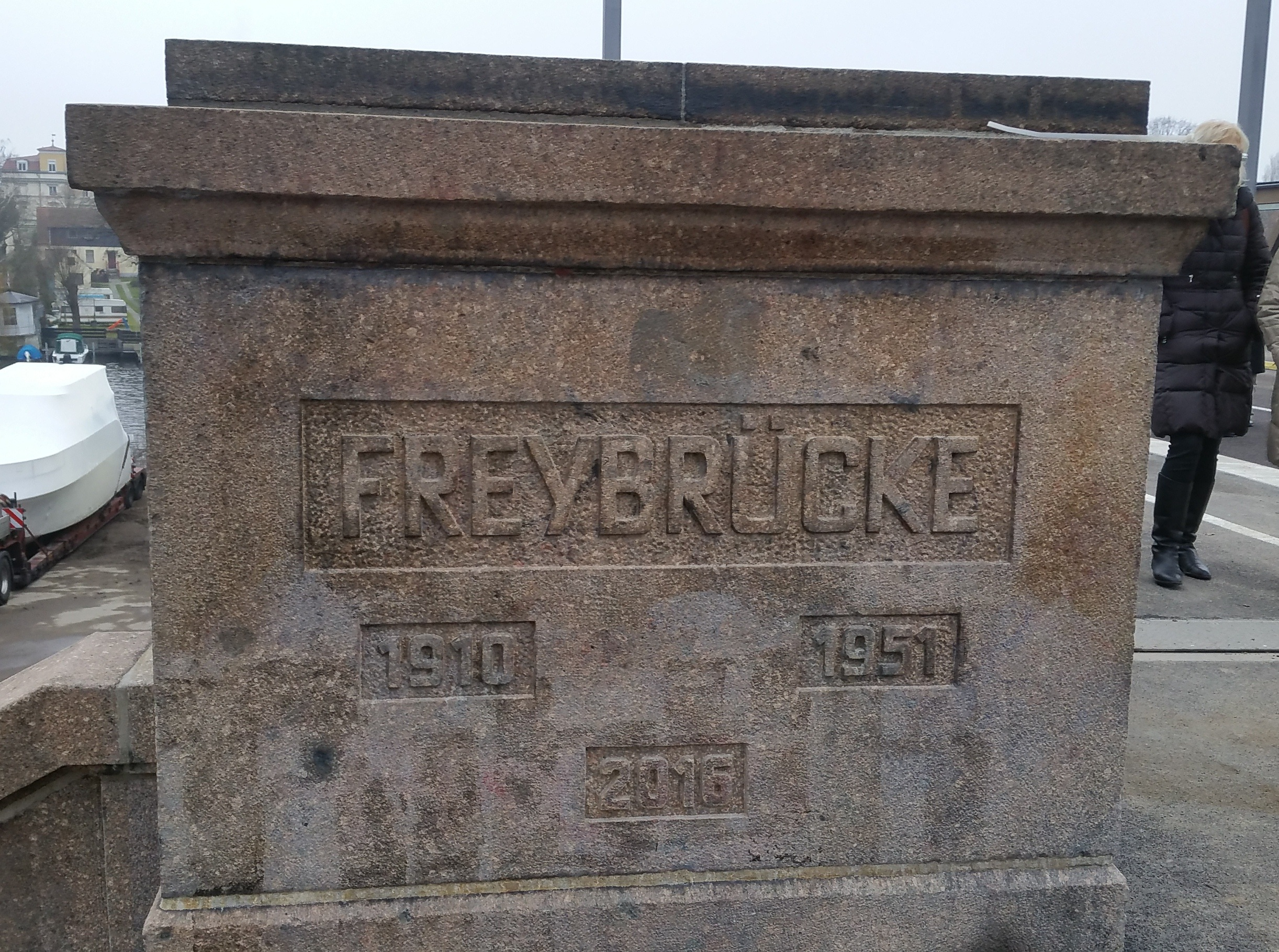
Name stone

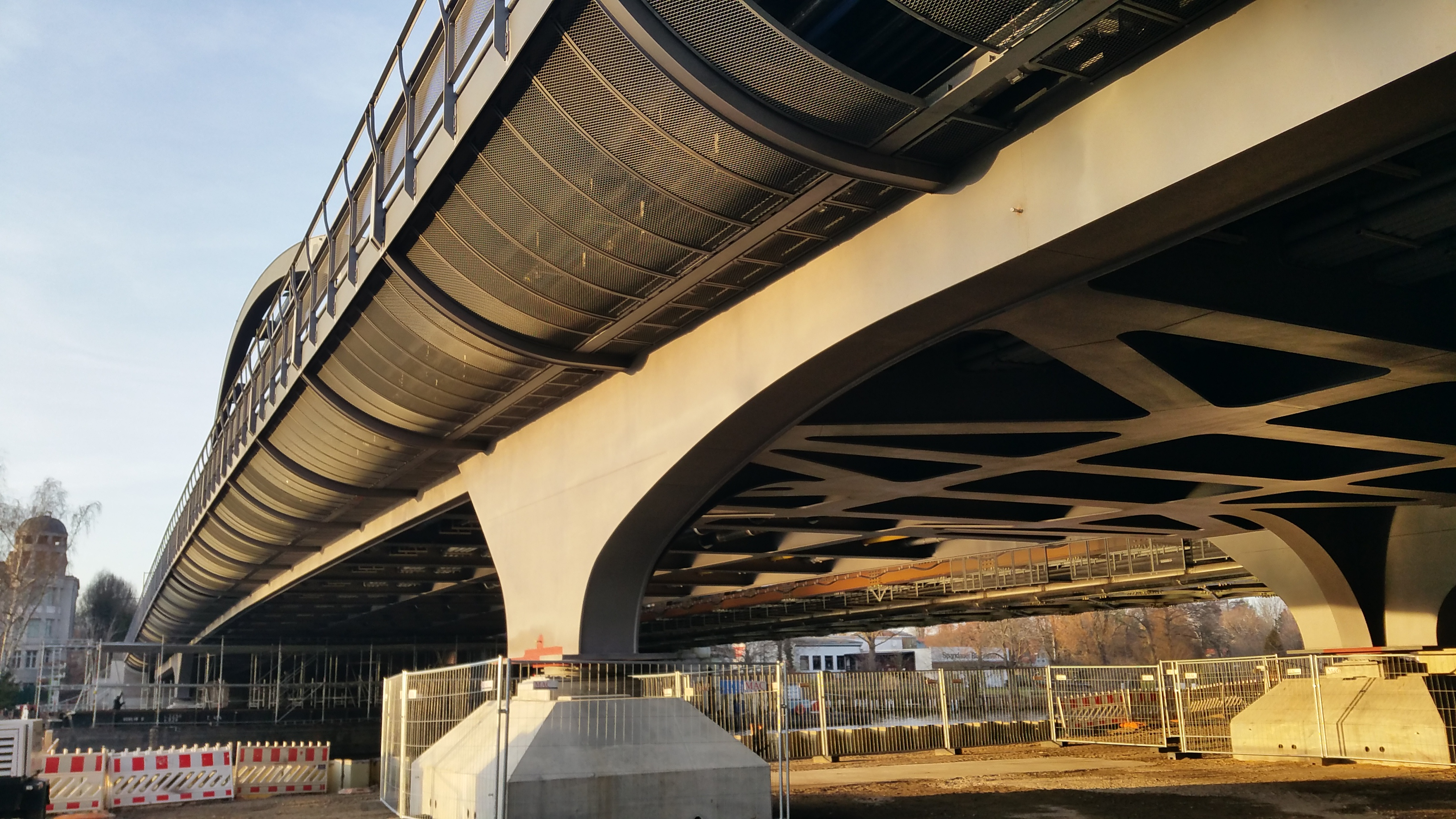
Bridge pier

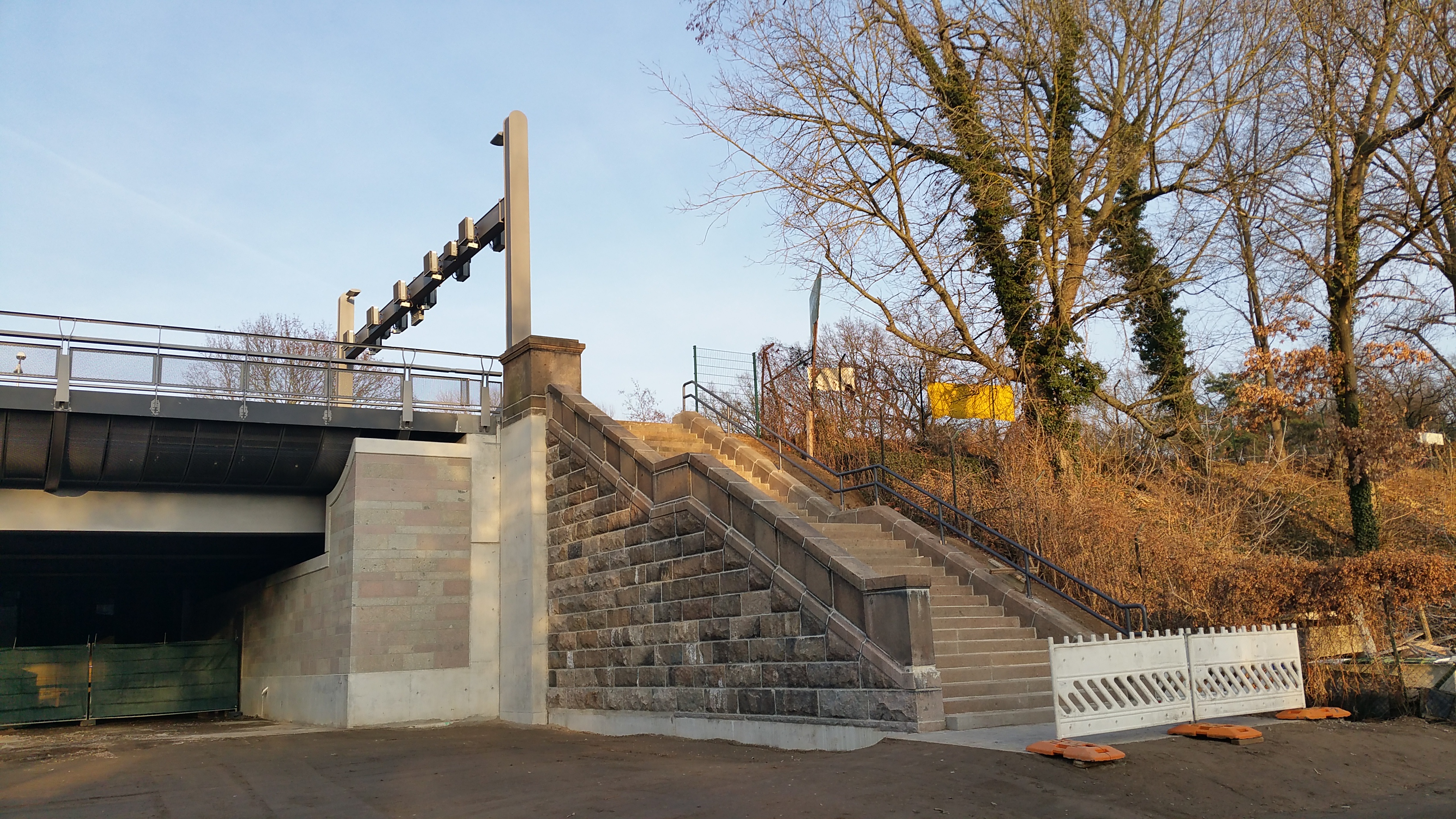
Historical staircase

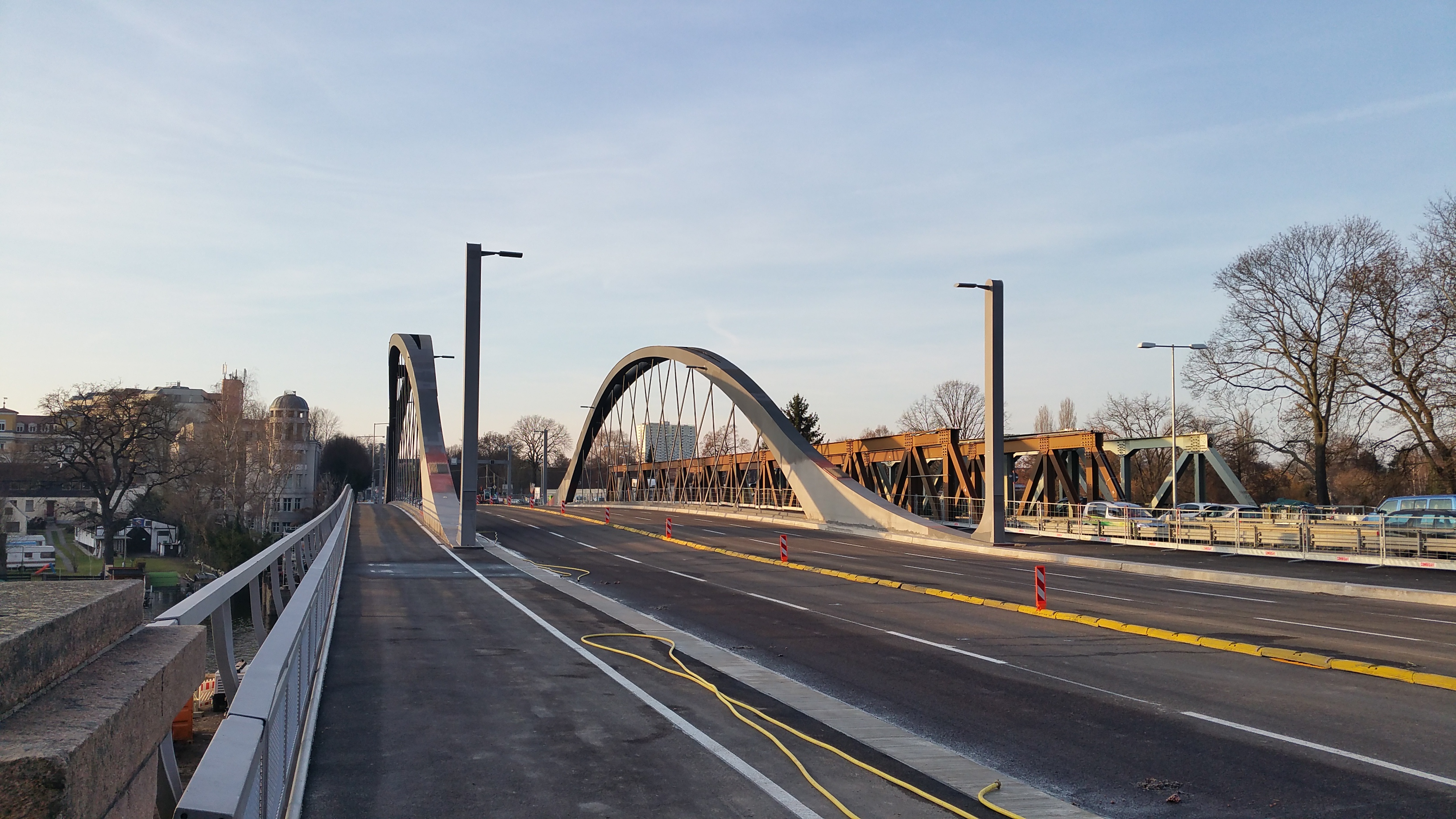
Roadway

Subsequently, the opening of the bridge for traffic occurred on December 20, 2016, after a short speech by State Secretary for Transport Jens-Holger Kirchner. In the beginning, only four lanes were available for use, as the northern pedestrian and bicycle paths could only be installed after the temporary bridges had been dismantled. This task was completed by the end of December 2017. After the removal of the makeshift bridges and the demolition of their approaches, a second stairway to the Havel River, heading in the direction of the city center will be created. In the future, pedestrians will be able to pass under the bridge on the east side and thus change sides of the street.

Construction progress
September 2014: pre-assembly of the bridge

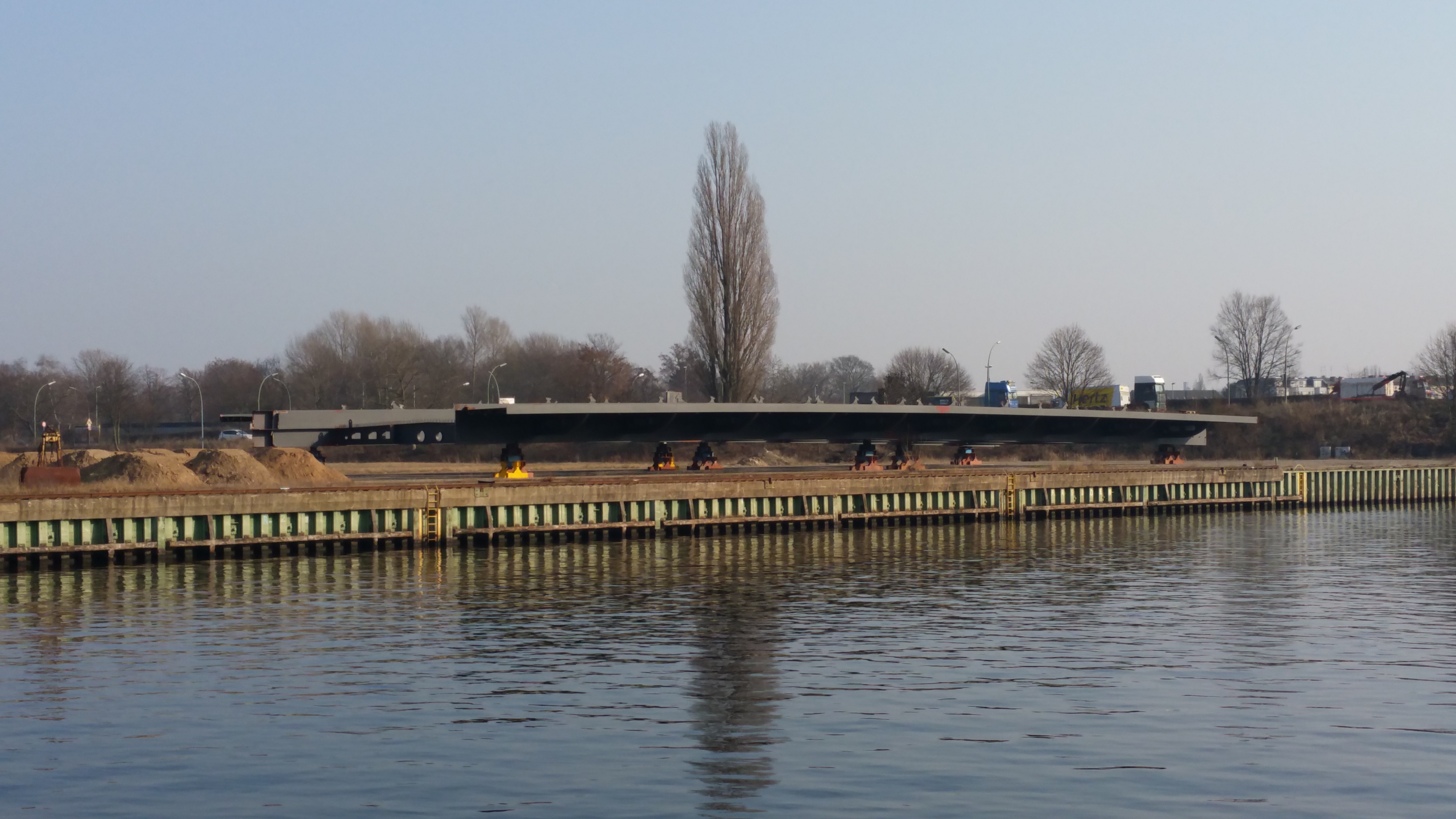
February 2016: Bridge on the side

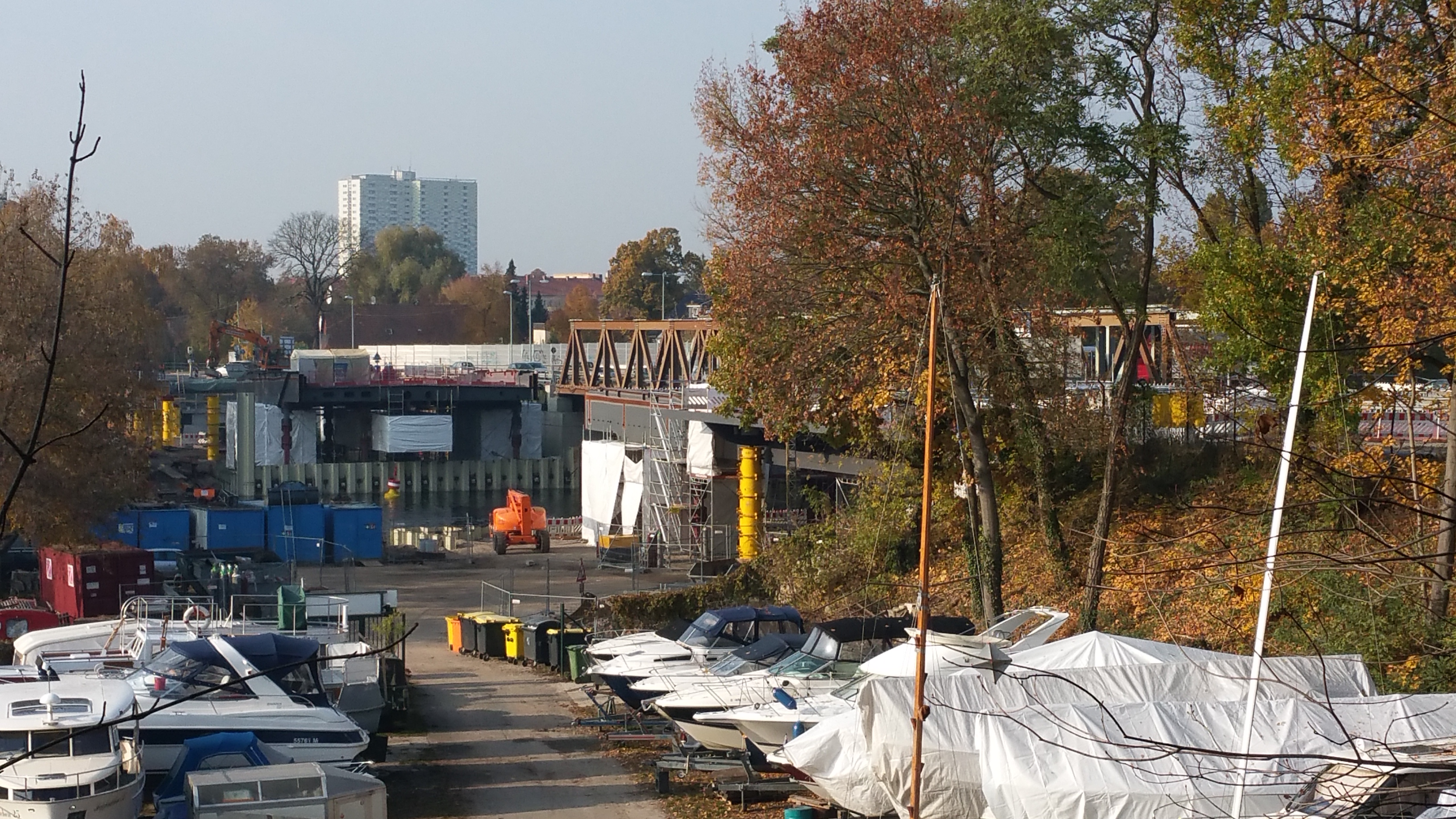
October 2015: Construction of the forerunners

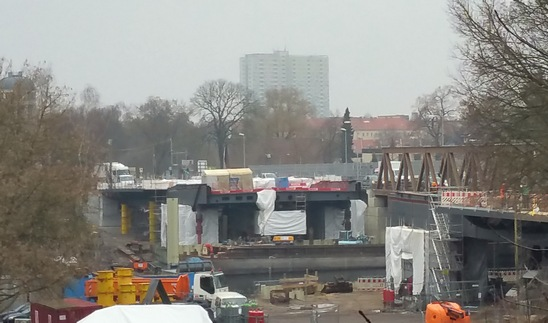
December 2015: Construction of the road surface for the approach bridges

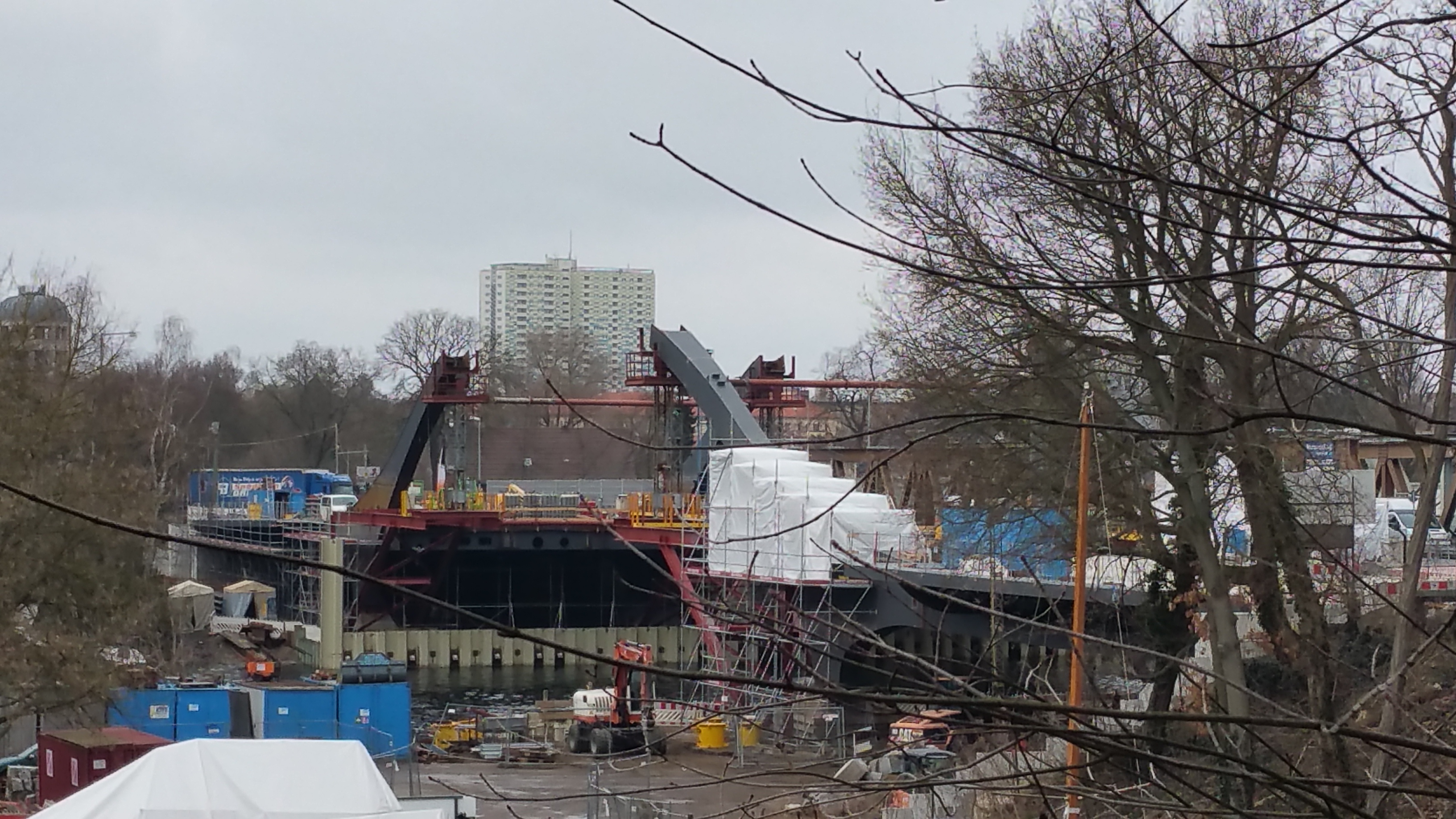
March 2016: Arch construction with support structure

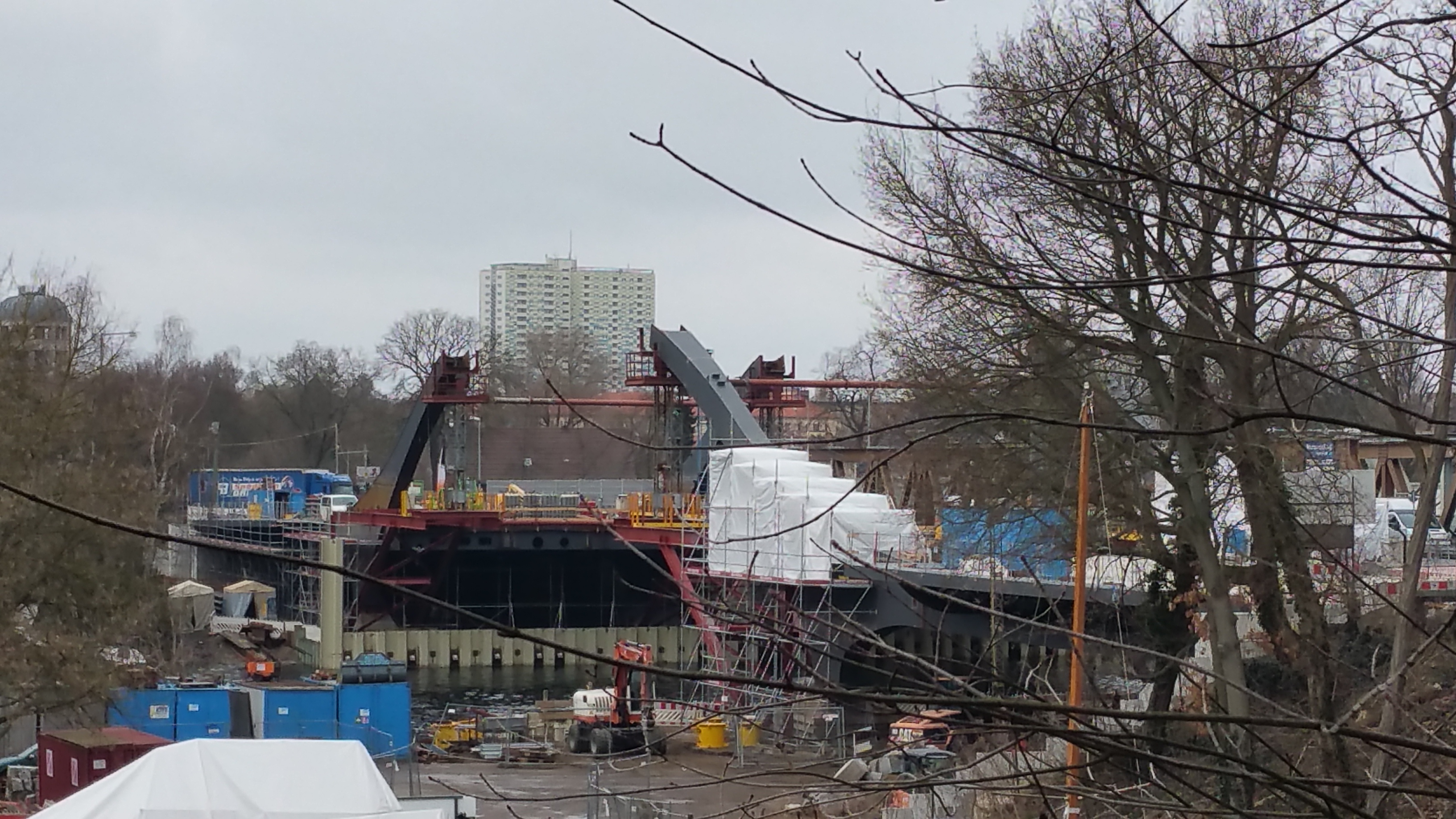
March 2016: Arch construction with support structure

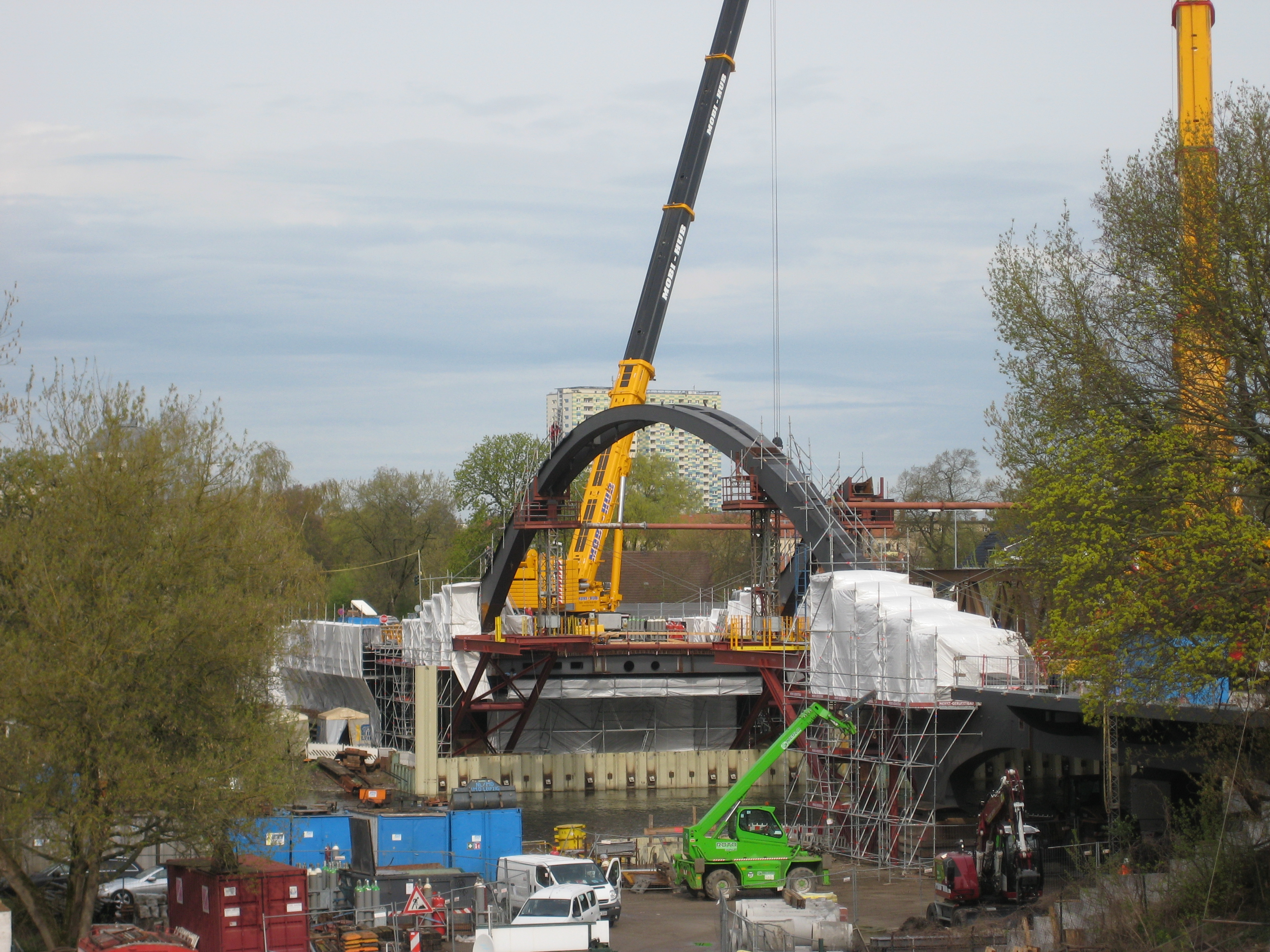
April 2016: Arch completion of the southern part

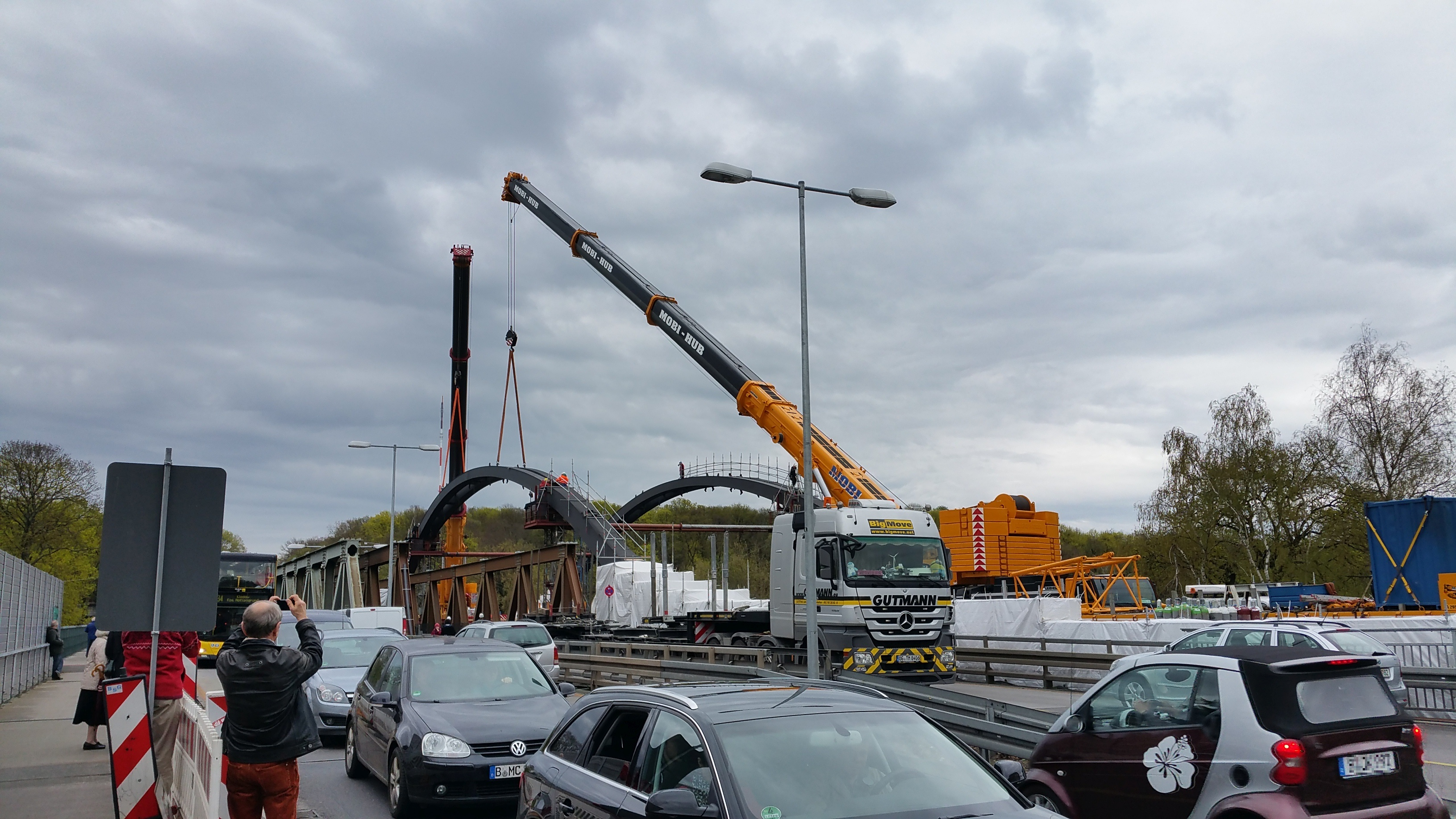
April 2016: Arch completion of the northern part

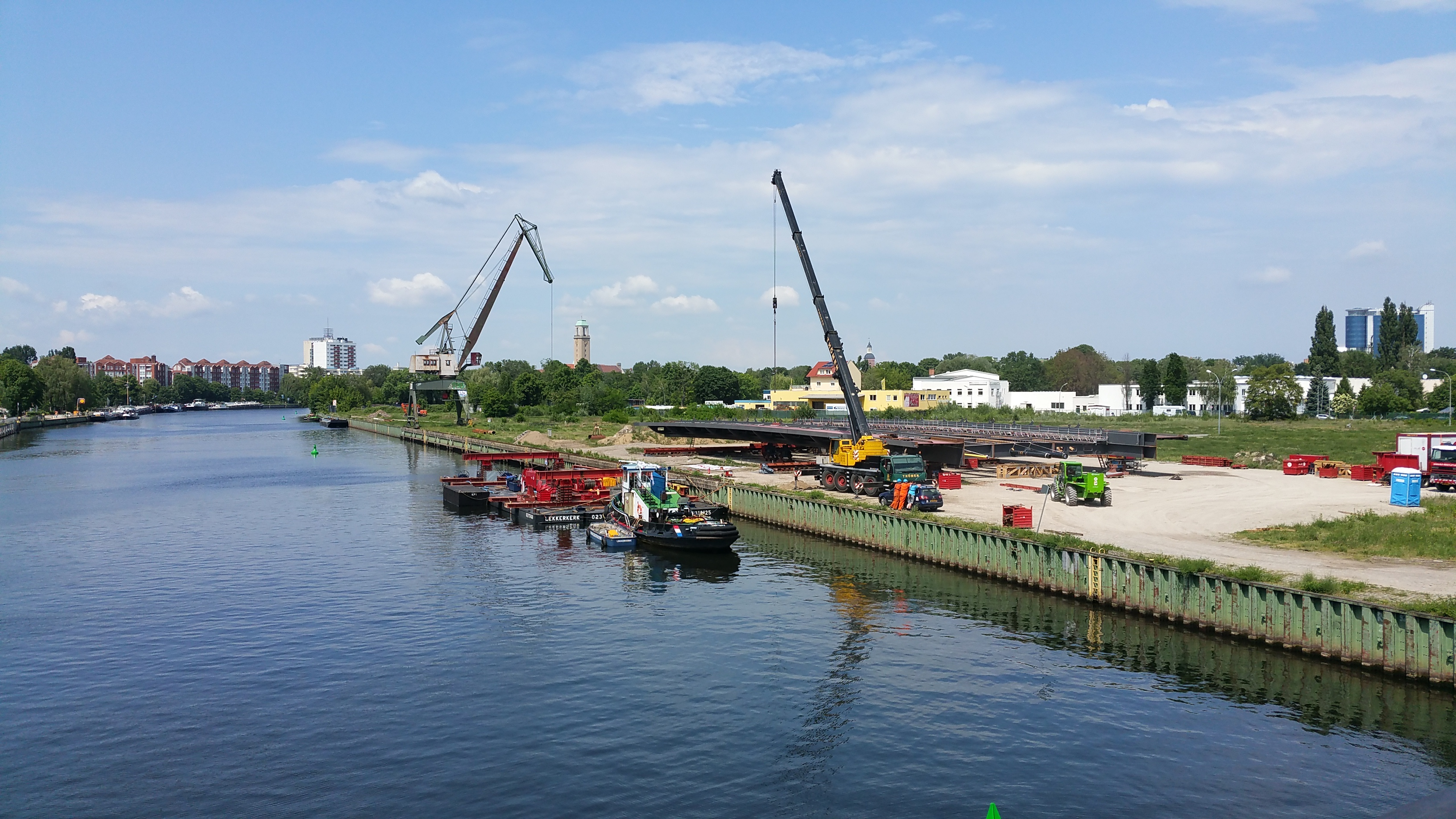
May 2016: Preparation for shipment of the stream field

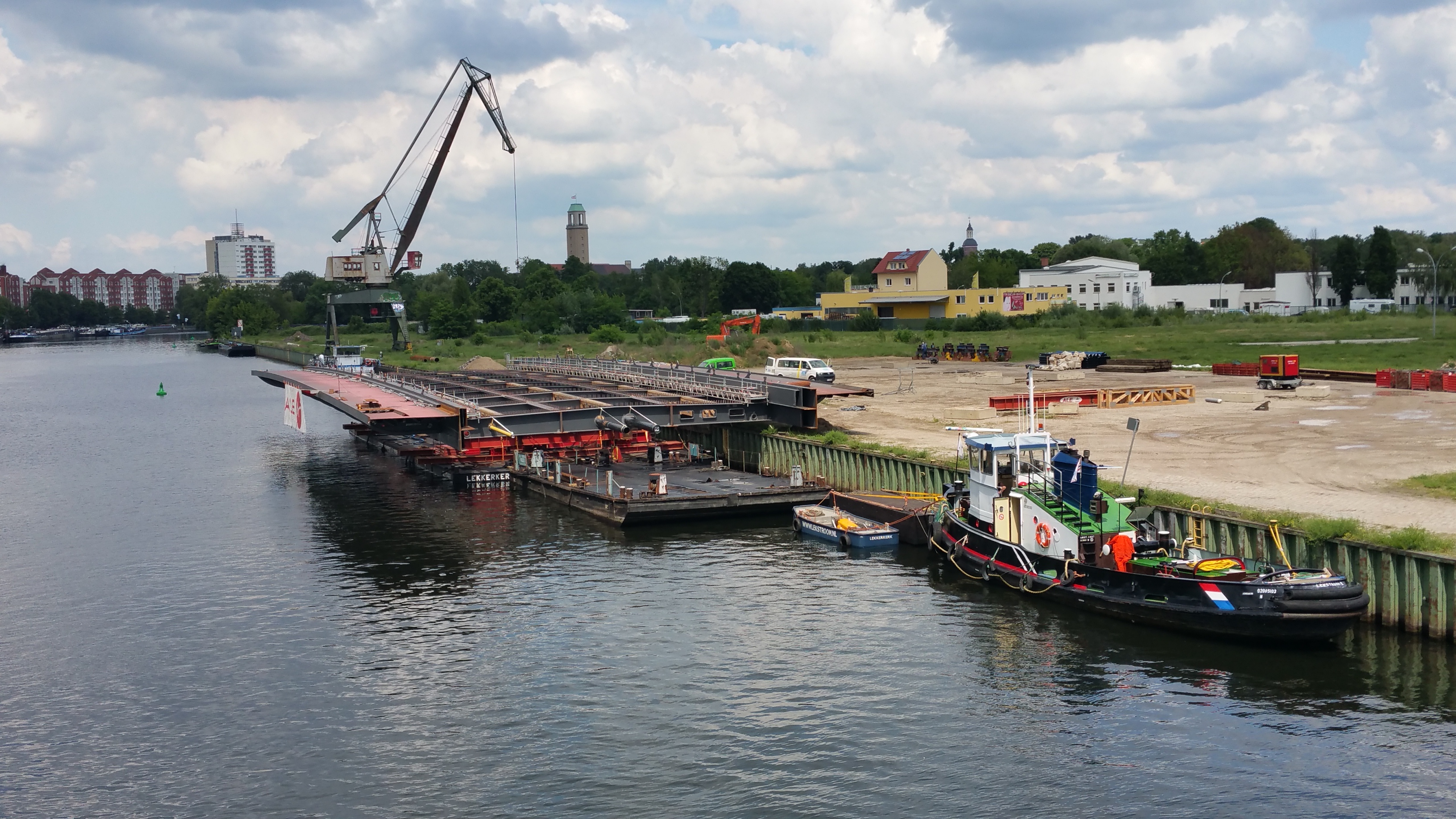
June 2016: The floating stream field (from the south)

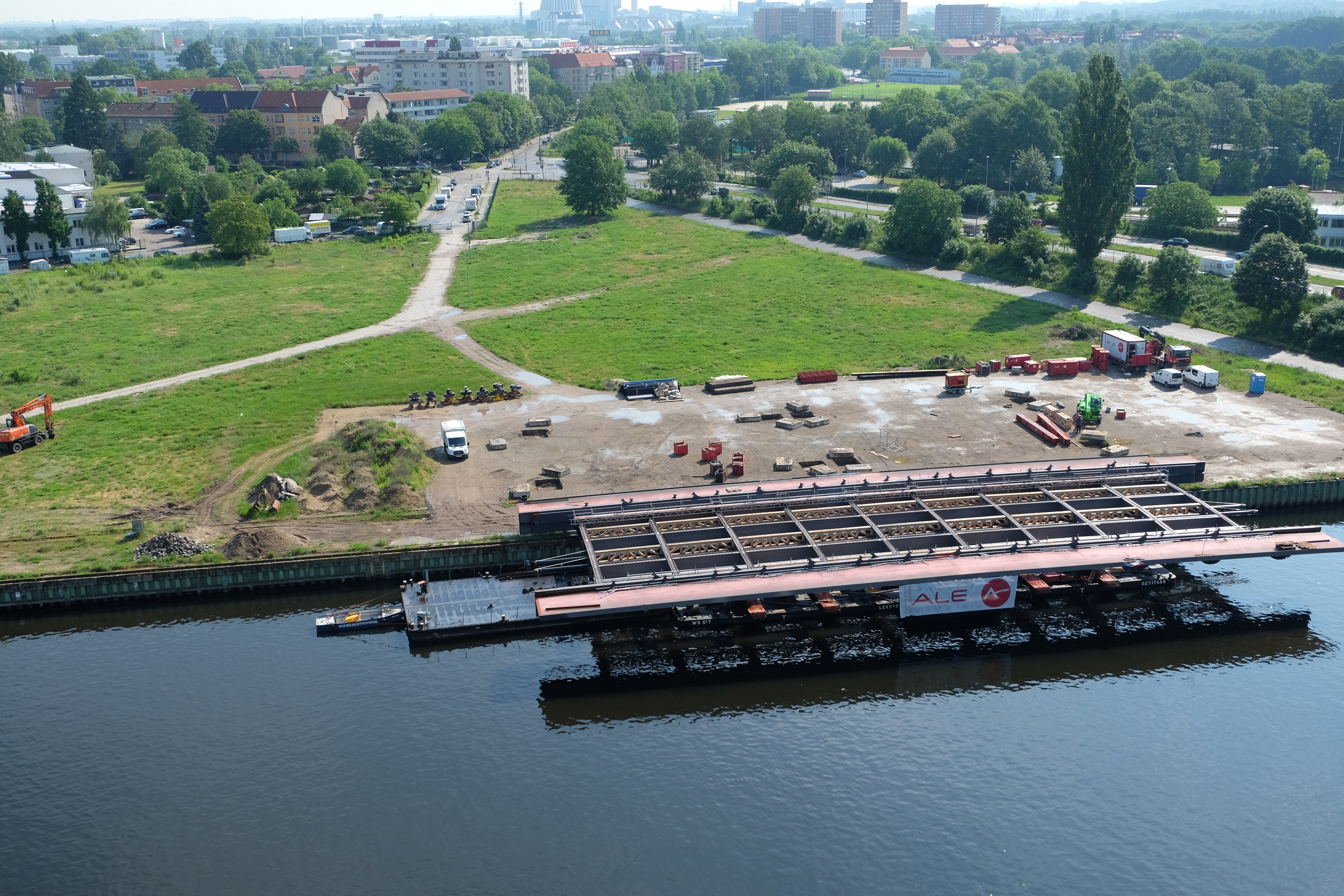
June 2016: The floating stream field (from the west)

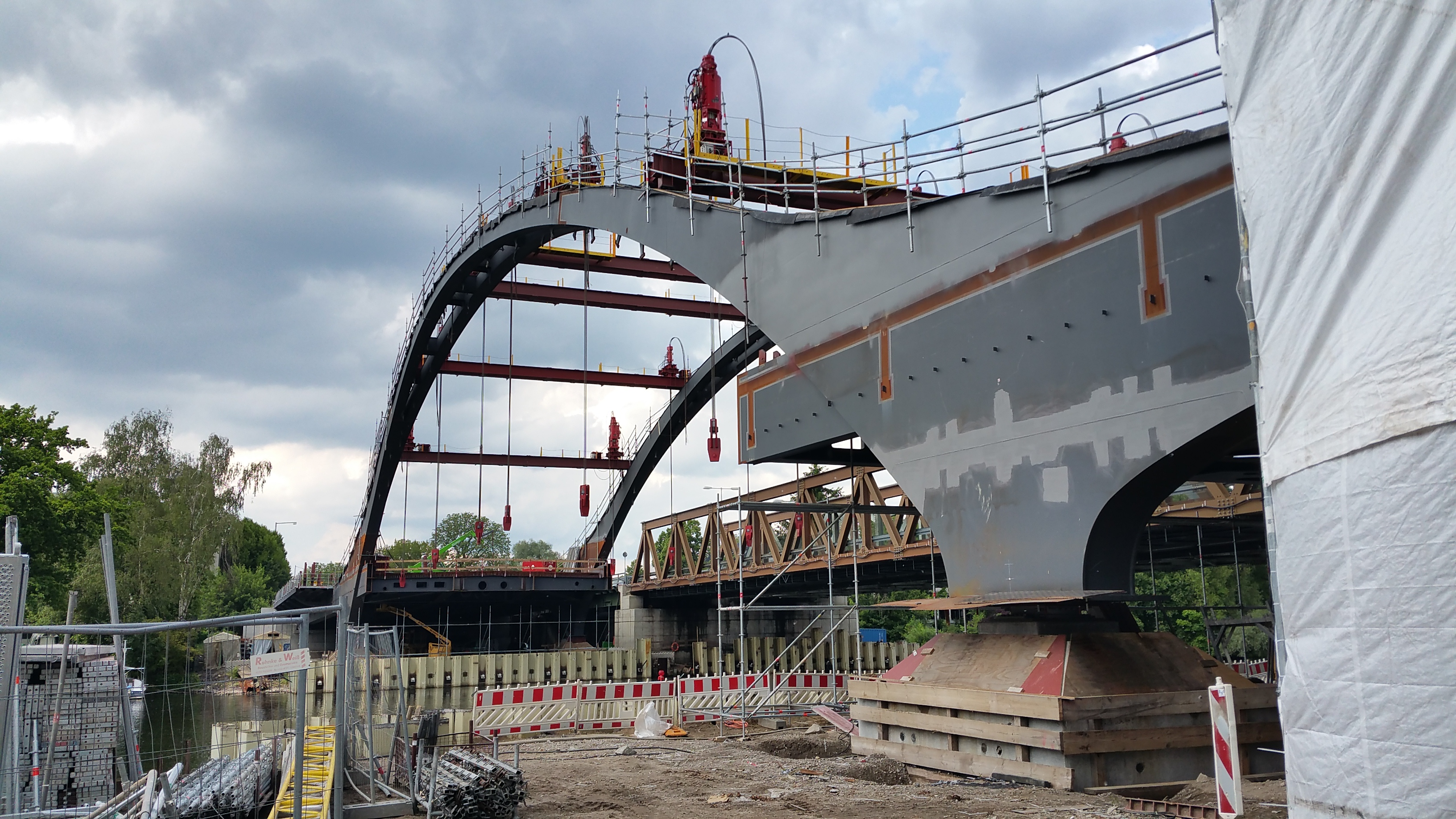
June 2016: Strand lifter to accommodate the current field

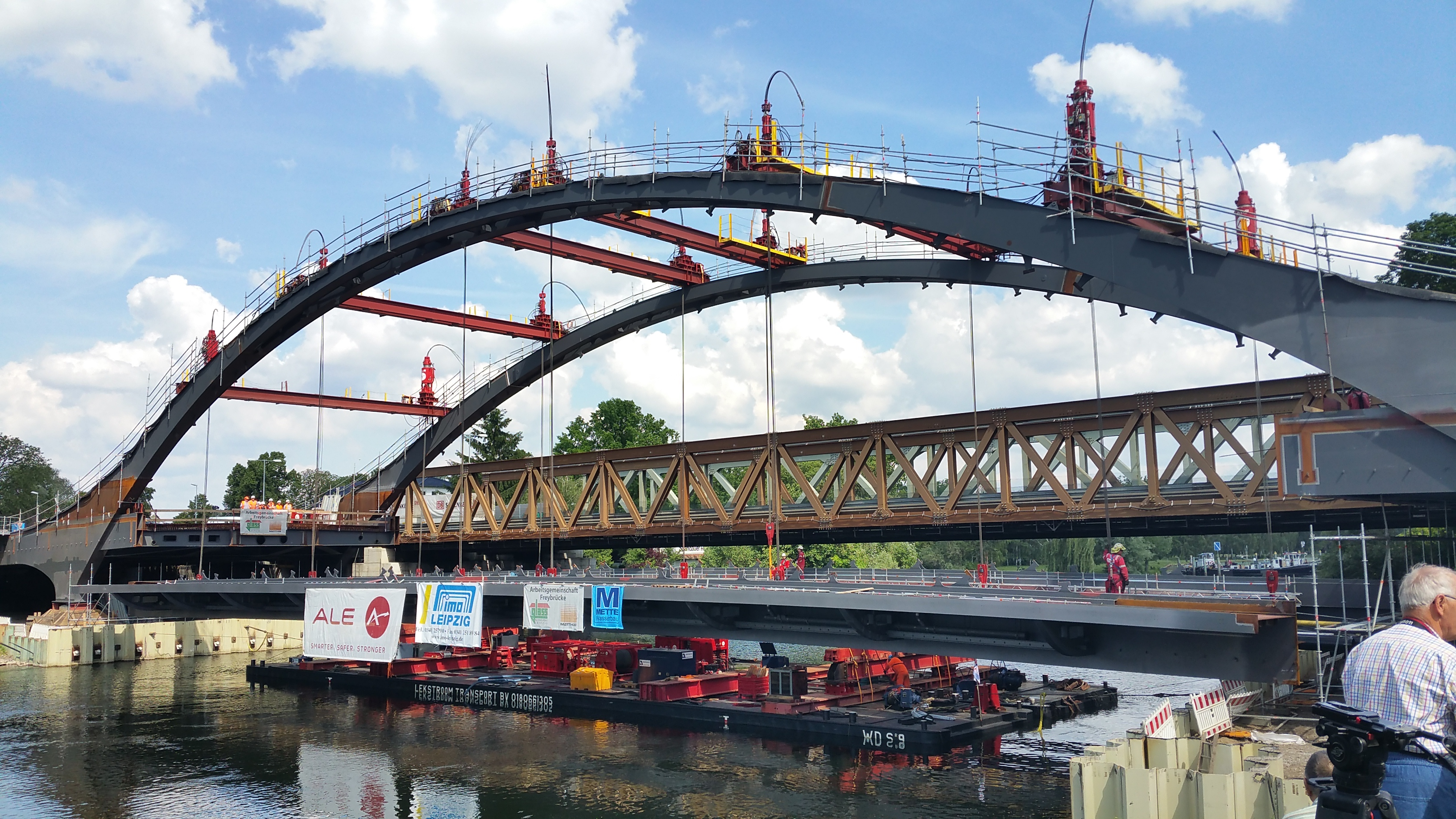
June 2016: Current field is lifted

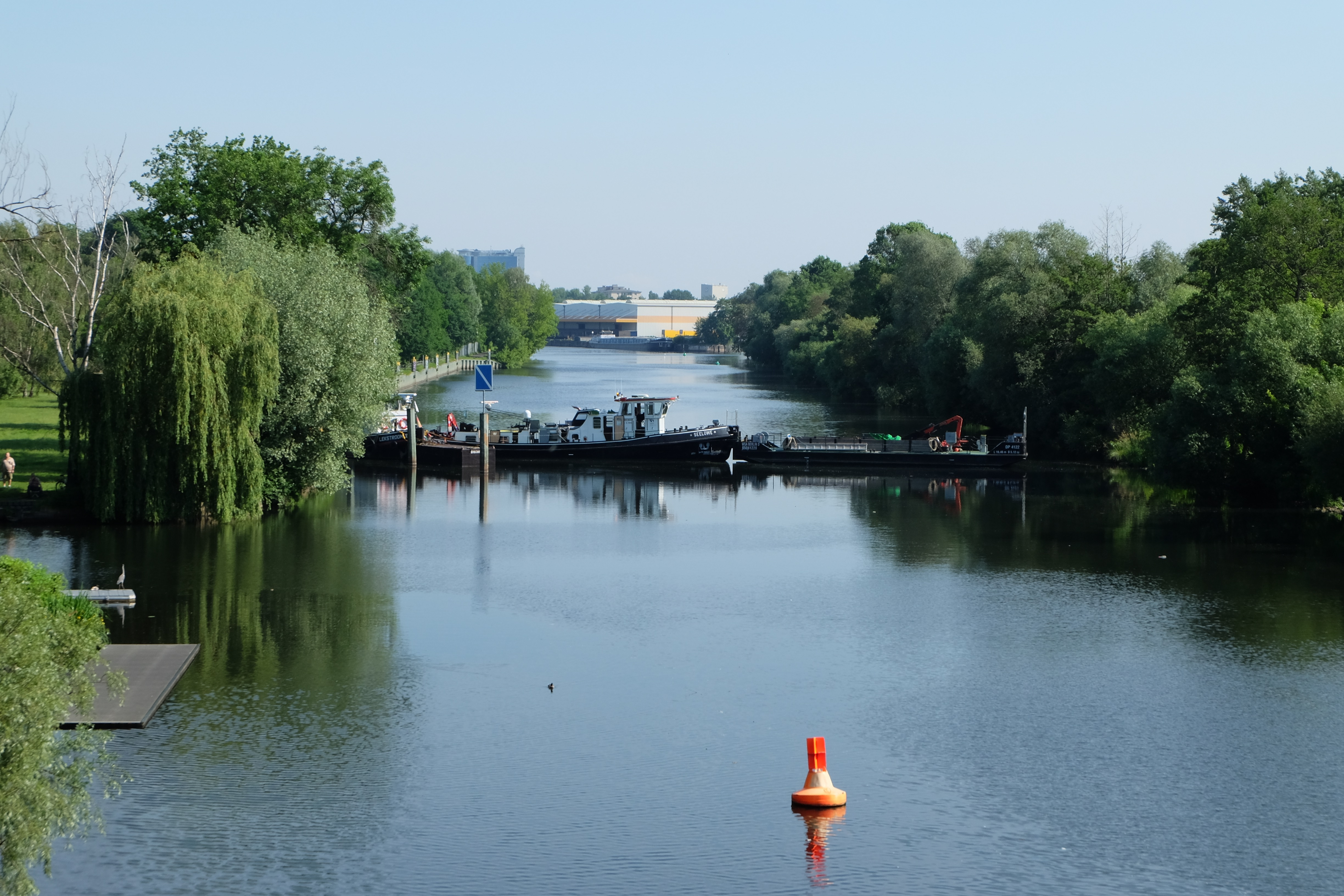
June 2016: Closure of the Havel River (north of the Frey Bridge)

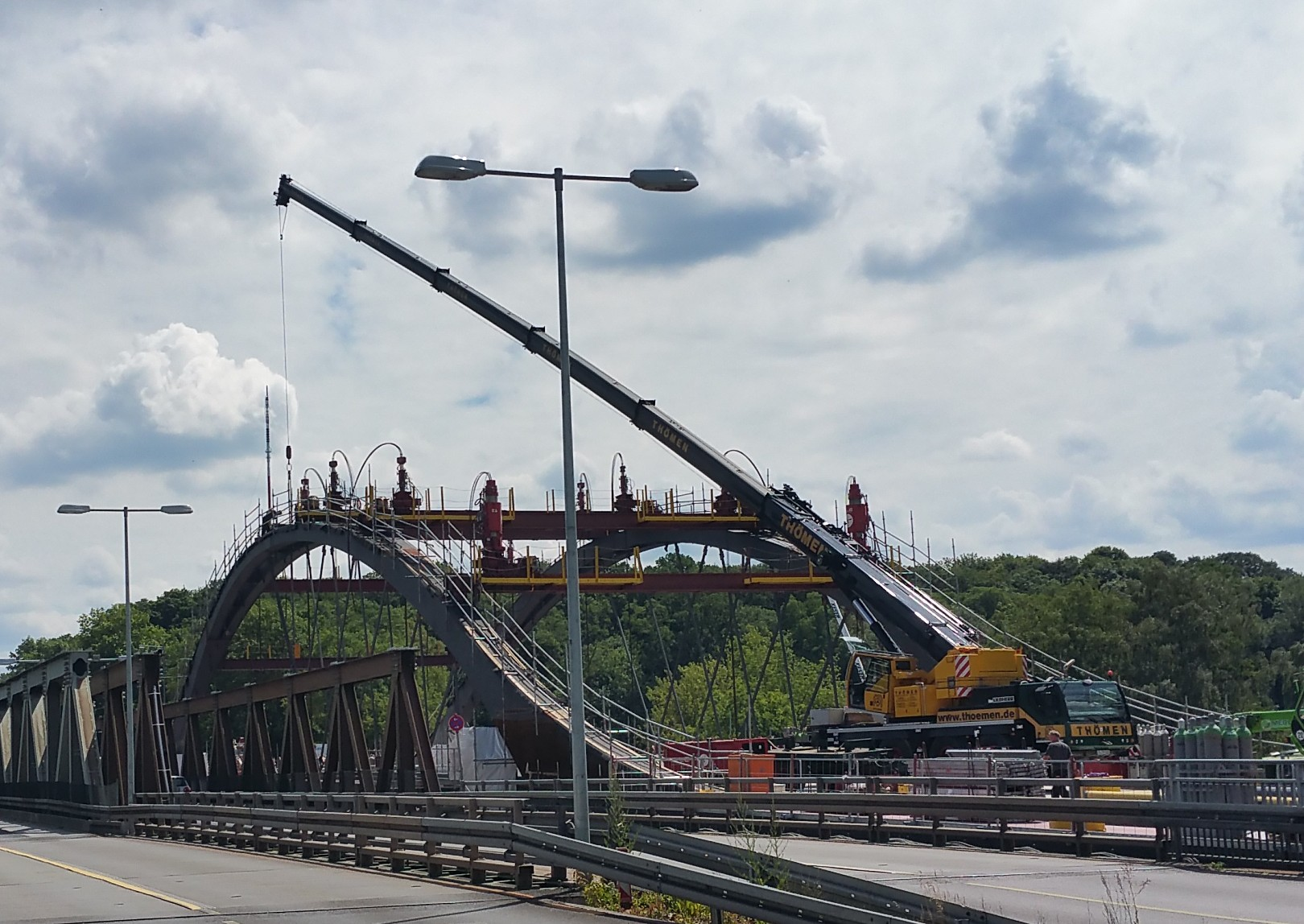
June 2016: Installation of the cross struts

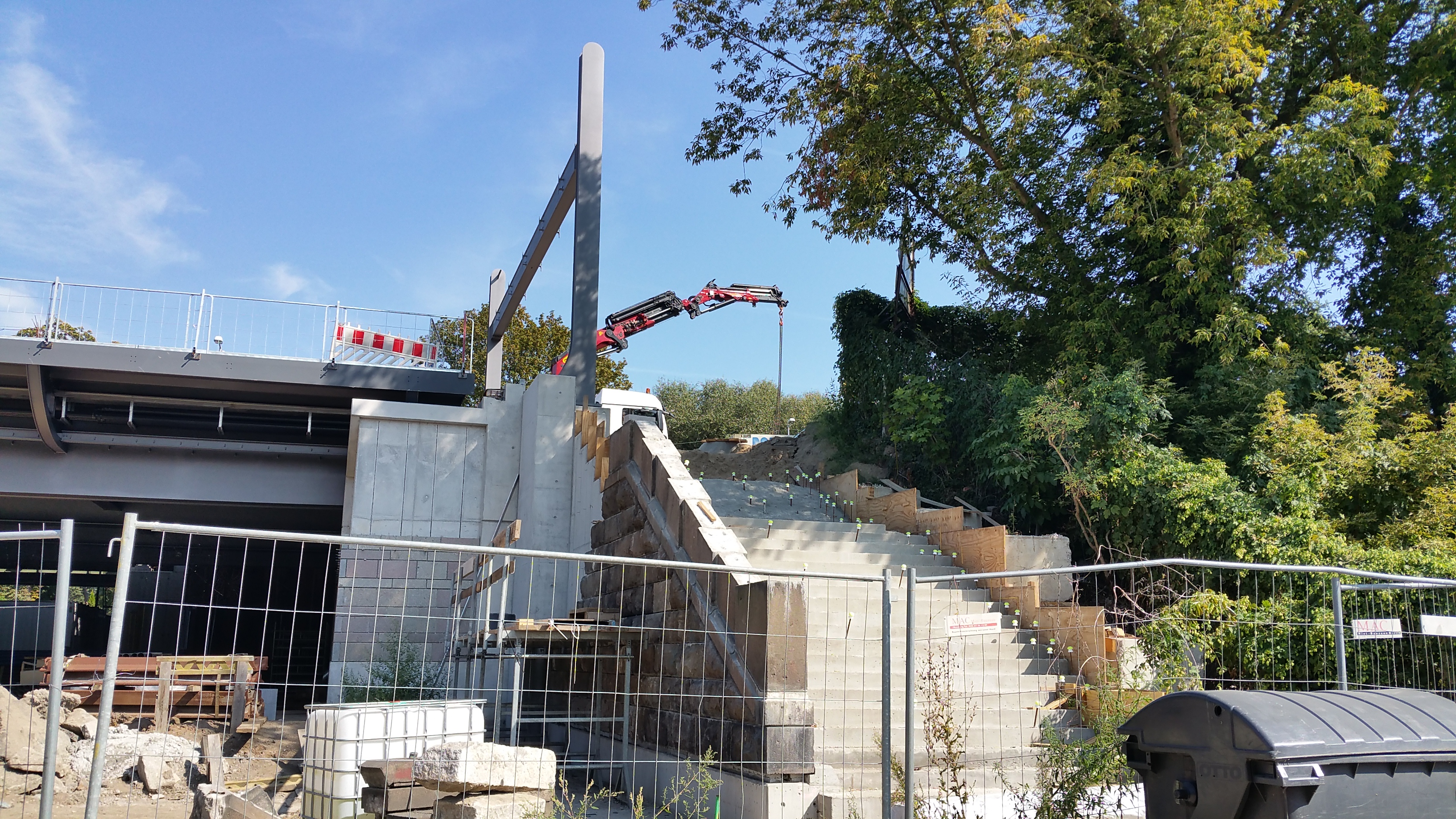
September 2016: Staircase according to historical model

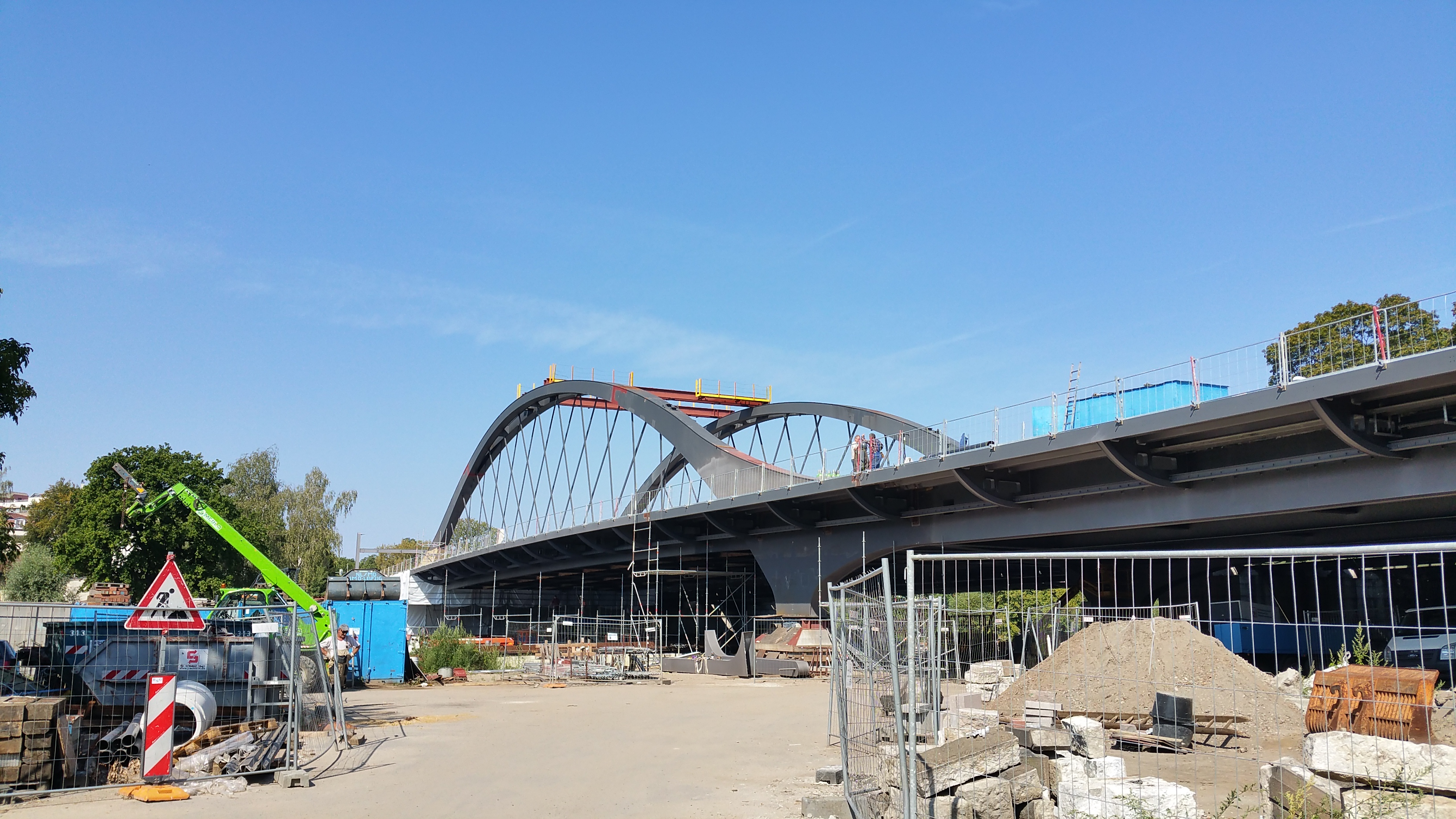
September 2016

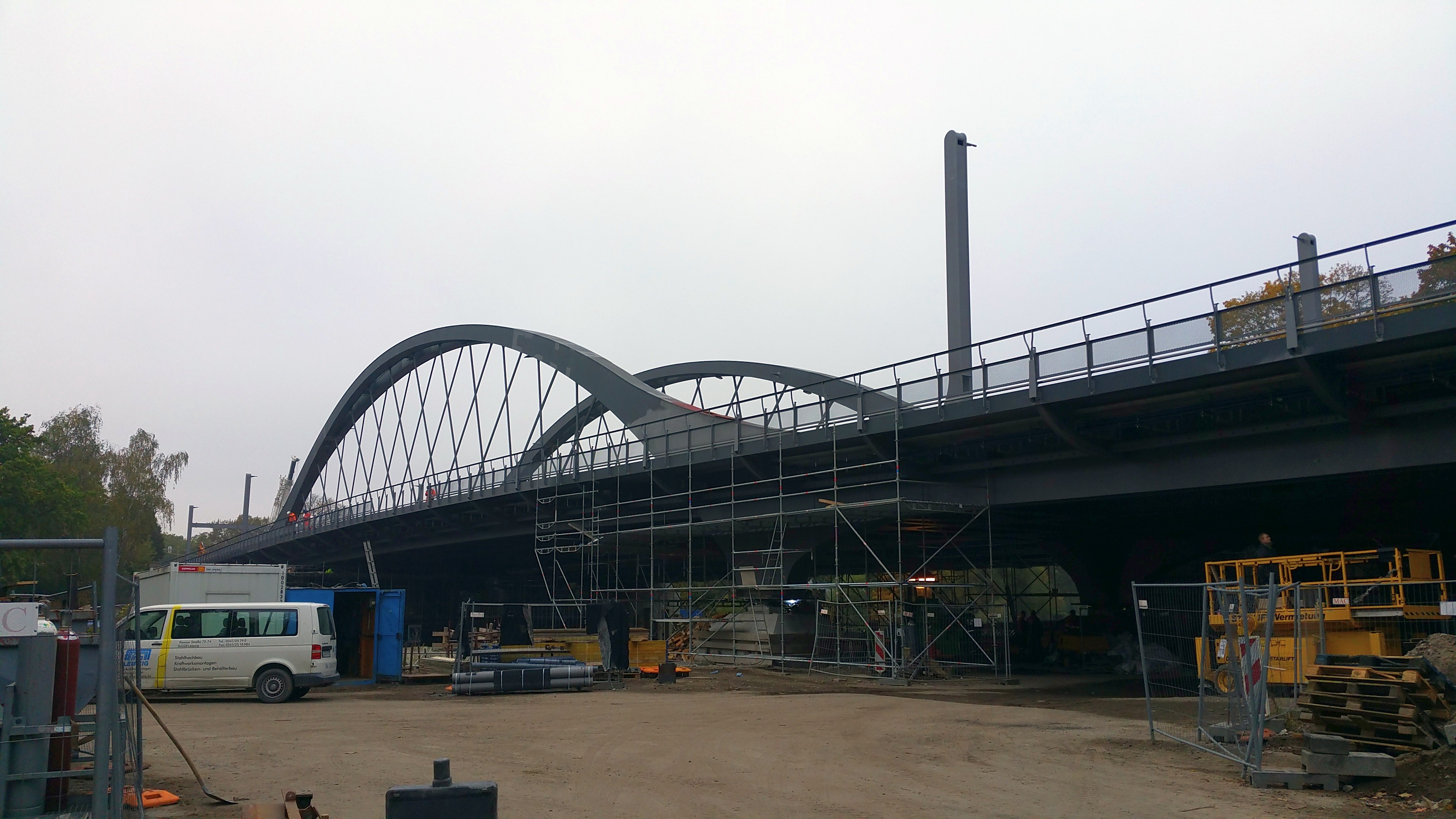
October 2016

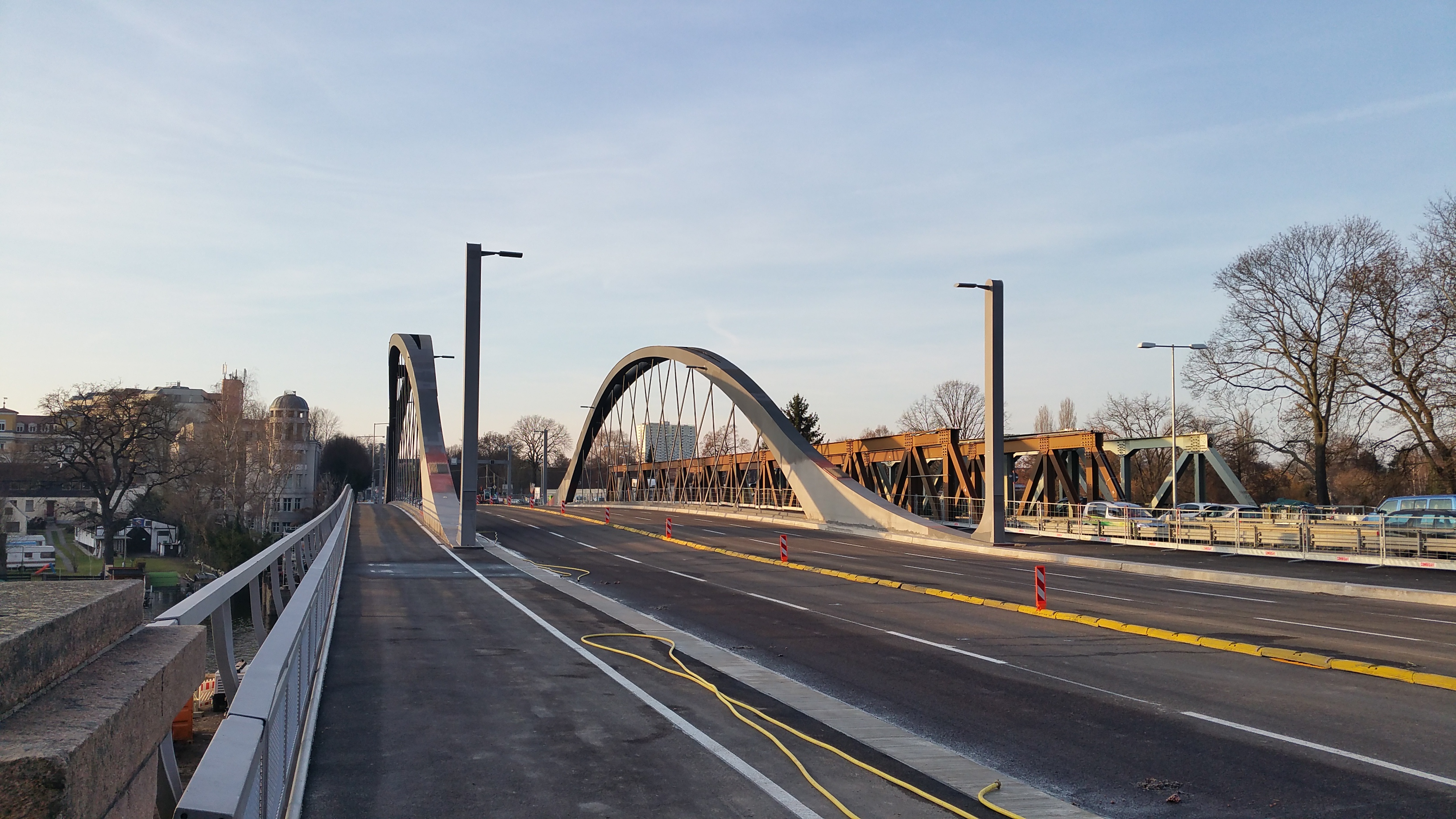
Roadway
