= SNCI Tower =

- Interactive map of the SNCI Tower area

General information
- Type: Apartment
- Location: New York City, New York
- Coordinates: 40.717°N 74.009°W

Height
- Antenna spire: 289.6 m (950 ft)

Technical details
- Floor count: 57
- Lifts/elevators: 2

Design and construction
- Architect: Solus4
- Engineer: LeMessurier Consultants

The SNCI Tower is a planned apartment skyscraper in Tribeca, Manhattan, New York City, New York. The building is planned to rise 289.6 meters (950 ft) with 57 floors. The building was proposed in mid-2011. The SNCI Tower was designed by the solus4 architectural firm and LeMessurier Consultants.

== Design ==
Solus4 designed the tower in accordance with what they dub their 'Sustainable Neighborhood Collaborative Initiative'. The tower features a double walled cladding system that uses a chimney effect to power turbines in the gap between the facades. The tower is supported by a stiff concrete spine that reduces the need for columns at the perimeter, opening up views. Each floor is a separate 3,000-square-foot (280 m^{2}) apartment. The base will have parking for a fleet of communally owned electric cars.

== See also ==
- List of tallest buildings in New York City
