= SunLink =

Renewable energy products manufacturer

SunLink Corporation
- Industry: Solar photovoltaics equipment
- Founded: 2004
- Headquarters: Mill Valley, California, United States
- Services: Designer and manufacturer

SunLink Corporation was a privately owned company headquartered in Mill Valley, California that manufactured renewable energy products. SunLink's Warehouse and Training Center was located in San Leandro, California. Product design, testing and fabrication took place in California. Manufacturing was done in the United States and China. Founded in 2004, SunLink installed more than 120,000 commercial and utility-scale installations throughout the Americas by 2012. In 2018, Nextracker, now known as Nextpower, sued SunLink for infringing on two of its patents regarding mounting, and securing, systems. In 2019, SunLink agreed to withdraw from the market and foreclosed on the majority of its assets.

Prior to the foreclosure, SunLink's product line included tracker, fixed-tilt and roof photovoltaic mounting systems for commercial and utility-scale installations; solar project installation and O&M services; and project intelligence software that offered energy project analytics and remote energy asset controls (SCADA). The company also conducted R&D work in the areas of seismic and wind engineering. Their partners included the Boundary Layer Laboratory at the University of Western Ontario and structural engineering firm Rutherford & Chekene. SunLink also conducted extensive seismic testing for two of its roof mount systems at UC Berkeley’s Pacific Earthquake Engineering Research Center Shake Table.
