= Simpson Gumpertz & Heger =

Engineering firm

- Type: Privately held
- Industry: Architecture, Engineering & Design, Commercial & Residential Construction
- Founded: 1956
- Founder: Frank Heger, Howard Simpson, and Werner Gumpertz
- Headquarters: 480 Totten Pond Road Waltham, MA 02451, Boston
- Number of locations: 8
- Key people: James Parker (CEO) & Niklas Vigener(CTO)
- Services: Design, Investigation, and Rehabilitation
- Revenue: ▲USD$110 million (2014)
- Number of employees: 625
- Website: www.sgh.com

Simpson Gumpertz & Heger Inc. (SGH) is a privately held ENR 500 engineering firm that designs, investigates, and rehabilitates structures and building enclosures. Their work encompasses commercial, institutional and residential buildings, transportation, water/wastewater, nuclear, science, and defense structure projects throughout the U.S. and over twenty foreign countries. SGH has 625 employees at eight offices in Atlanta, Boston, Chicago, Houston, New York City, Oakland, Southern California and Washington, D.C.

== Services ==
SGH provides services in Commercial, Institutional and Residential Buildings; Transportation; Nuclear; Water/Wastewater; and Science/Defense structures. SGH services are supported by technical capabilities, including: Building Enclosure Engineering, Structural Engineering, Engineering Mechanics, Building Science and Construction Engineering. Their practice encompasses design, investigation and performance evaluation, repair and rehabilitation of constructed works. SGH implements innovative techniques for design, analysis, and project management. Their laboratories supports design and investigation work with material, mechanical, and environmental testing. The majority of their projects are buildings in diverse markets, including educational, industrial, healthcare, and residential.

== Background ==
Founded in 1956 by three former Massachusetts Institute of Technology professors – Howard Simpson, Werner Gumpertz, and Frank Heger – SGH specializes in structural design, historic preservation and evaluation of building exteriors. The firm has a reputation for assessing structural or interior damage to buildings. Nationally, SGH is recognized as an expert on the science and causes of structural failure. For example, when mirror-glass panels began falling off Boston's John Hancock Tower and had to be temporarily replaced with plywood in 1973, SGH was hired to analyze what went wrong. More recently, SGH was hired by the National Institute of Standards and Technology (NIST) to investigate the collapse of New York's World Trade Center and assess the Towers' structural response to impact damage and fire after the September 11, 2001 attacks. NIST retained SGH to develop computer models simulating the towers’ structural response to aircraft impact and subsequent fires. Several studies, conducted by NIST and its consultants, provided input for the SGH study, including aircraft impact analysis, fire dynamics and heat transfer models. NIST also tested structural steel recovered from the WTC site to determine its mechanical and metallurgical properties including temperature-dependent thermal expansion, modulus, plastic flow, and creep properties. SGH first developed models of components, connections, and subsystems of the WTC towers and studied their structural response to fire-induced temperatures over time. Using results of such studies, SGH developed computationally efficient global models of the towers and performed FE analyses from initial impact through each tower's collapse.

=== Financial development ===
Under the leadership of Glenn R. Bell as chief executive officer from 1995 through 2016, SGH experienced dramatic growth. In his tenure, the firm expanded from two offices with $14 million in annual revenue to six offices and nearly $104 million in revenue. According to a 2007 interview, the company's revenues grew 15–20 percent annually the last 5–10 years. In addition to daily corporate management, Glenn led strategic planning, rebranding, and company reorganization – while maintaining the best of its existing culture with low staff turnover. Charles J. Russo took over as CEO in January 2017. As of January 2022 James Parker is Chief Executive Officer (CEO) and Niklas Vigener is Chief Technical Officer (CTO).

From 2001 to 2005, SGH increased total revenues more than 72.2 percent. By 2006, SGH had become a $50 million, 300-person firm, with the Waltham office accounting for $30 million and 160 employees. Revenue increased 25 percent from 2006 to 2007, while revenue from the New York office doubled between 2006 and 2007. Total billings for fiscal 2007 amounted to approximately $70 million (up from $37.1 million in 2003, $46.5 million in 2005, and $56.7 million in 2006). One factor widely credited with contributing to SGH's growth was a new marketing strategy which introduced the company to a nationwide audience through seminars, publications, and newsletters.

== Projects ==
The firm has influenced the design or restoration of many recognizable structures, including Spaceship Earth, the 160-foot-diameter (49 m) geodesic sphere at the entrance of Epcot Center; New York's Grand Central Terminal; and the Hultman Aqueduct in Massachusetts. Further, masonry design (construction and reconstruction) always has been a major part of the SGH's project portfolio. These skills have been used on several high-profile and/or award-winning masonry projects, including both contemporary designs and historic restorations. Some projects in these categories include: the New Jersey Performing Arts Center (Newark, New Jersey), the Miami Dade Center/Stephen P. Clark Government Center (Miami, Florida), and the Bowdoin College Chapel Restoration (Brunswick, Maine).

== Awards ==
SGH has picked up several industry awards over the years. In 2013, they received 15 national and regional project awards and recognitions. This included two lifetime achievement awards, one international "best of" award, and 4 "top firms" rankings from the Boston and San Francisco Business Journals. Since 2004, SGH has ranked as a "Best Firm to Work For" by Structural Engineer and CE News magazines, and has been ranked in the top 10 of structural firms since 2005.

In March 2006, SGH received the Gold Engineering Excellence award from the American Council of Engineering Companies of Massachusetts (ACEC-MA). ACEC-MA recognized SGH for its project, Global Analysis of World Trade Center Towers Subjected to Impact Damage and Fire. The entry detailed SGH's work for the National Institute of Standards and Technology (NIST) determining the events sequence in the WTC collapse on 9-11. The annual Engineering Excellence program recognizes exceptional performance in engineering. Winning firms are ranked as silver, gold, platinum, and Grand Conceptor.

=== Recognitions ===
==== Design services ====
- "Dancing Ladies" – East Station Plaza "Danseurs" Sculptures, Union City, California
  - SEAONC 2014 Excellence in Structural Engineering Awards for Special-Use Structures
- China Basin Landing – San Francisco, CA
- Massachusetts Institute of Technology, Simmons Hall – Cambridge, MA
  - 2004 Harleston Parker Medal, American Institute of Architects
- De Young Museum – San Francisco, CA
  - 2006 Excellence in Architecture: Civic Achievement Award; American Institute of Architects, San Francisco Chapter
- New Museum of Contemporary Art – New York City, NY
  - 2007 "Best of 07" Award, Best Cultural Project of the Year, New York Construction Magazine

==== Investigation services ====
- World Trade Center Towers – New York, NY
- John Hancock Center Scaffold – Chicago, IL
- Pacific Park Plaza – Emeryville, CA

==== Rehabilitation services ====
- University of Arizona, Phoenix Biomedical Campus, Health Sciences Education Building
  - Metal Architecture Design Awards, Natural Metals Award, 2013 Metal Architecture magazine
  - Most Challenging Project, 2013 RED Awards Arizona Commercial Real Estate
  - 2013 Honor Award for Architectural Design AIA California Council
- Massachusetts Institute of Technology, Building 10 Dome Restoration, Cambridge, MA
  - Silver Award, Engineering Excellence Competition – 2011 American Council of Engineering Companies of Massachusetts (ACEC/MA)
  - Aon Build America Award, Construction Management Renovation category – 2010 Aon Build America
- Sutro Tower – San Francisco, CA
- Griffith Observatory – Los Angeles, CA
  - 2007 24th Annual Reconstruction Award, Gold, Building Design & Construction Magazine;
  - 2007 Los Angeles Conservancy Preservation Award;
  - 2007 National Preservation Honor Award, National Trust for Historic Preservation;
  - 2007 Preservation Design Award Rehabilitation Category, California Preservation Foundation;
- Longfellow Towers – Cambridge, MA
  - 2005 Award of Excellence in the Repair of High-rise Structures; International Concrete Repair Institute
- New York State Capitol Building – Albany, NY
  - 2013 Best Safety Project, Engineering News Record;
  - 2007 Preservation Merit Award, Historic Albany Foundation;
  - 2007 Excellence in Historic Preservation, Preservation League of New York State
  - 2004 Gold Circle Award, National Roofing Contractors Association;
  - 2003 Best of Hudson Valley, Best Interior Lighting, Hudson Valley Magazine

== See also ==
- AECOM
- Arcadis US
- Bechtel
- HNTB Cos.
- Jacobs
- LeMessurier Consultants
- Louis Berger Group
- Walter P Moore Engineers and Consultants
