= Staggered truss system =

Type of steel framing used in high-rise buildings

The staggered truss system is a type of structural steel framing used in high-rise buildings. The system consists of a series of story-high trusses spanning the total width between two rows of exterior columns and arranged in a staggered pattern on adjacent column lines. William LeMessurier, the founder of LeMessurier Consultants has been credited in developing this award winning system as part of his research at the Massachusetts Institute of Technology.

== History ==
The staggered truss system came about due to sponsored research at Massachusetts Institute of Technology's Departments of Architecture and Civil Engineering in the 1960s by U.S. Steel. The research attempted to achieve the same floor-to-floor height with steel as you could with flat plate concrete. The system was presented at the 1966 AISC Conference (the predecessor to the current North American Steel Construction Conference). Additional benefits discovered were high resistance to wind loads and versatility of floor layout with large column-free areas.

It has been used with on a number of LeMessurier Consultants work in hotels including Lafayette Place Hotel in Boston and the Aladdin Hotel in Las Vegas. Other locations that use this system include the Resorts International Hotel in Atlantic City, New Jersey, Embassy Suites hotel in New York City, Baruch College Academic Center in New York City, Trump Taj-Mahal in Atlantic City NJ, and the Renaissance Hotel in Nashville TN

== Description ==
The staggered truss system for steel framing is an efficient structural system for high-rise apartments, hotels, motels, dormitories, and hospitals. The arrangement of story-high trusses in a staggered pattern at alternate column lines provide large column-free areas for room layouts. These column free areas can be utilized for ballrooms, concourses, and other large areas.

The staggered truss structural system consists of story-high steel trusses placed on alternating column lines on each floor so that the long axis of one truss is always between the trusses on the floor below. The system staggers trusses on a 12’ module, meaning that on any given floor the trusses were 24’ apart.

The interaction of the floors, trusses, and columns makes the structure perform as a single unit, thereby taking maximum advantage of the strength and rigidity of all the components simultaneously. Each component performs its particular function, totally dependent upon the others for its performance.

The total frame behaves as a cantilever beam when subjected to lateral loads. All columns are placed on the exterior wall of the building and function as the flanges of the beam, while the trusses which span the total transverse width between columns function as the web of the cantilever beam.

While earlier staggered truss systems utilized channels for web diagonals and verticals, today most of the trusses are designed with hollow structural sections (HSS) for vertical and diagonal members because they are more structurally efficient and easier to fabricate. The trusses are fabricated with camber to compensate for dead load and are transported to the site, stored and then erected—generally in one piece.

Fabrication of this type of structure requires certified welders and overhead cranes capable of lifting 10 to 15-ton trusses and columns for projects up to 20 stories. Fabrication involves the following components: Columns, Spandrel Beams, Trusses, Secondary Columns & Beams and the Floor System.

== Advantages ==
- Large clear span open areas for ballrooms, or other wide concourse are possible at the first floor level, because columns are located only on the exterior faces of the building. This allows for spaces as much as 60 feet in each direction with columns often only appearing on the perimeter of a structure. This also increases design flexibility especially for atrium placement and open space floor plans.
- Floor spans may be short bay lengths, while providing two column bay spacing for room arrangements. This results in low floor-to-floor heights. Typically, an 8'-8" floor-to-floor height is achieved.
- Columns have minimum bending moments due to gravity and wind loads, because of the cantilever action of the double-planar system of framing.
- Columns are oriented with their strong axis resisting lateral forces in the longitudinal direction of the building.
- Maximum live load reductions may be realized because tributary areas may be adjusted to suit code requirements.
- Foundations are on column lines only and may consist of two strip footings. Because the vertical loads are concentrated at a few column points, less foundation formwork is required.
- Drift is small, because the total frame is acting as a stiff truss with direct axial loads only acting in most structural members. Secondary bending occurs only in the chords of the trusses.
- High strength steels may be used to advantage, because all truss members and columns are subjected, for all practical purposes, to axial loads only.
- A lightweight steel structure is achieved by the use of high strength steels and an efficient framing system. Since this reduces the weight of the superstructure, there is a substantial cost savings in foundation work.
- Faster to erect than comparable concrete structures. Once two floors are erected, window installation can start and stay right behind the steel and floor erection. No time is lost in waiting for other trades, such as bricklayers, to start work. Except for foundations, topping slab, and grouting, all "wet" trades are eliminated.
- Fire resistance; steel is localized to the trusses, which only occur at every 58-to-70-feet on a floor, so the fireproofing operation can be completed efficiently. Furthermore, the trusses are typically placed within demising walls and it is possible that the necessary fire rating can be entirely by enclosing the trusses with gypsum wallboard. Finally, if spray-on protection is desired, the applied thickness can be kept to a minimum due to the compact nature of the truss elements.
