= List of structural engineering companies =

The following is a list of notable structural engineering companies. Only companies with a Wikipedia article should be included in the list. Many of the companies included in this list do not practice only structural engineering, but may also be involved in civil engineering, architecture, and other related practices.

See also list of structural engineers and lists of engineers.

== A ==
- AKT II
- Arup Group
- Aurecon

== D ==
- Dar Al-Handasah

== E ==
- Expedition Engineering
- Exponent

== G ==
- Geiger Engineers
- GHD Group

== H ==
- HDR

== L ==
- LeMessurier Consultants
- Louis Berger Group

== M ==
- Magnusson Klemencic Associates
- Miyamoto International
- Mott MacDonald

== P ==
- Popp & Asociații

== R ==
- Rutherford + Chekene

== S ==
- Severud Associates
- Simpson Gumpertz & Heger Inc.
- Skidmore, Owings & Merrill

== T ==
- Thornton Tomasetti

== W ==
- Walter P Moore
- Weidlinger Associates
- Whitbybird
- Wiss, Janney, Elstner Associates, Inc.
- WSP Global
  - WSP USA
