= Structural system =

Load-bearing sub-system of a building or object in structural engineering

The term structural system or structural frame in structural engineering refers to the load-resisting sub-system of a building or object. The structural system transfers loads through interconnected elements or members.

Commonly used structures can be classified into five major categories, depending on the type of primary stress that may arise in the members of the structures under major design loads. However any two or more of the basic structural types described in the following may be combined in a single structure, such as a building or a bridge in order to meet the structure's functional requirements.

- Tensile structures: Members of tensile structures are subject to pure tension under the action of external loads. Because the tensile stress is uniformly distributed over the cross-sectional area of members, the material of such a structure is utilized in the most efficient manner.
- Compressive structures: Compression structures develop mainly compressive stresses under the action of axial loads. Because compressive structures are susceptible to buckling or instability, the possibility of these failures should be considered in their design. If necessary, adequate bracing must be provided to avoid such failures.
- Trusses: Trusses are composed of straight members connected at their ends by hinged connections to form a stable configuration. Because of their light weight and high strength, they are among the most commonly used types of structure.
- Shear structures: These are structures such as reinforced concrete or wooden shear walls, which are used in multistory buildings to reduce lateral movements due to wind loads and earthquake excitations. Shear structures develop mainly in-plane shear with relatively small bending stresses under the action of external loads.
- Bending structures: Bending structures develop mainly bending stresses under the action of external loads. The shear stresses associated with the changes in bending moments may also be significant, and should be considered in their design.

== High-rise buildings ==
The structural system of a high-rise building is designed to cope with vertical gravity loads as well as lateral loads caused by wind or seismic activity. The structural system consists only of the members designed to carry the loads, and all other members are referred to as non-structural.

A classification for the structural system of a high-rise was introduced in 1969 by Fazlur Khan and was extended to incorporate interior and exterior structures. The primary lateral load-resisting system defines if a structural system is an interior or exterior one. The following interior structures are possible:

- Hinged frame
- Rigid frame
- Braced frame and Shear-walled frame
- Outrigger structures (supporting overhangs)

The following exterior structures are possible:

- Buttresses
- Diagrid
- Exoskeleton
- Space truss
- Superframe
- Tube (structure)

== See also ==
- Base isolation
- Body-on-frame (automotive)
- Buttressed core
- Double wishbone suspension (automotive)
- MacPherson strut (automotive)
- Monocoque (automotive)
- Space frame
- Staggered truss system
- Superleggera (automotive)
