= LeMessurier Consultants =

Engineering support company

LeMessurier Consultants, Inc.
- Type: Private
- Industry: Architecture, Structural Engineering
- Founded: 1961; 65 years ago
- Founder: William LeMessurier
- Headquarters: 1380 Soldiers Field Road, Boston, Massachusetts, US
- Number of locations: 1
- Key people: Greg Shreve (president, chairman)
- Number of employees: 50
- Website: www.lemessurier.com

LeMessurier Consultants, Inc. is an American firm, founded by William LeMessurier in 1961. It provides engineering support services to architects and construction firms. They focus on advanced structural techniques and impacts to construction materials. They are known for their modular construction techniques including the Mah-LeMessurier System for precast concrete in high-rise housing, the Staggered Truss System for high-rise steel structures, and the tuned mass damper used to reduce tall building motion. One of the best known uses of the damper is the John Hancock Tower in Boston. In addition to new construction, they also work with retrofitting buildings and historic preservation.

== See also ==
- Simpson Gumpertz & Heger Inc.
- Thornton Tomasetti
- Arup Group
- Skidmore, Owings, and Merrill
