= Rutherford + Chekene =

Engineering firm in California, United States

- Company type: Private
- Industry: engineering consulting
- Founded: 1960 by John Rutherford and Constantine Chekene
- Headquarters: San Francisco
- Website: www.ruthchek.com

Rutherford + Chekene is a structural and geotechnical engineering firm in California specializing in new design and retrofit of structures for clients in sectors that include healthcare, higher education, corporate, research and development, art and education, and technology.

Rutherford + Chekene began implementing 3-D modeling to produce building information models (BIM) in 2005. R+C has developed more than $3 billion in construction using BIM created with Revit, Tekla and other software.

== History ==
Rutherford + Chekene was founded in San Francisco in 1960 by two structural engineers, John Rutherford and Constantine Chekene. John served as the company’s first president, and in 1975, Constantine Chekene succeeded John as President.

== Notable projects ==
- Bakar Precision Cancer Medicine Building, San Francisco
- Structural engineer of record for the new Jan Shrem and Maria Manetti Shrem Museum of Art at UC Davis
- Seismic consulting for bridging documents and structural and geotechnical peer review of the San Francisco International Airport Air Traffic Control Tower
- UCSF Smith Cardiovascular Research Building at Mission Bay
- UC Merced Science and Engineering Building 2, Merced
- New Exploratorium, San Francisco
- UC Berkeley Boalt Hall Law Library, Berkeley
- UC Davis Gallagher Hall and Conference Center for the UC Davis Graduate School of Management, Davis
- Designing for Wind Loads on Solar Arrays, California
- De Young Museum, San Francisco
- Monterey Bay Aquarium, Monterey
- Monterey Bay Aquarium Research Institute, Moss Landing
- Renovation and expansion of the UC Santa Cruz McHenry Library, Santa Cruz
- Genentech Hall, QB3, and hospital at the UCSF Mission Bay campus
- Pixar Animation Studios, Emeryville
- California Strong Motion Instrumentation Program (CSMIP) Study
- Geotechnical engineer of record for the California Academy of Sciences in Golden Gate Park
- Seismic consulting after the 2011 Christchurch earthquake, New Zealand
