= Schulenburgbrücke =

Steel arch bridge over the Lower Havel Waterway in Berlin-Spandau

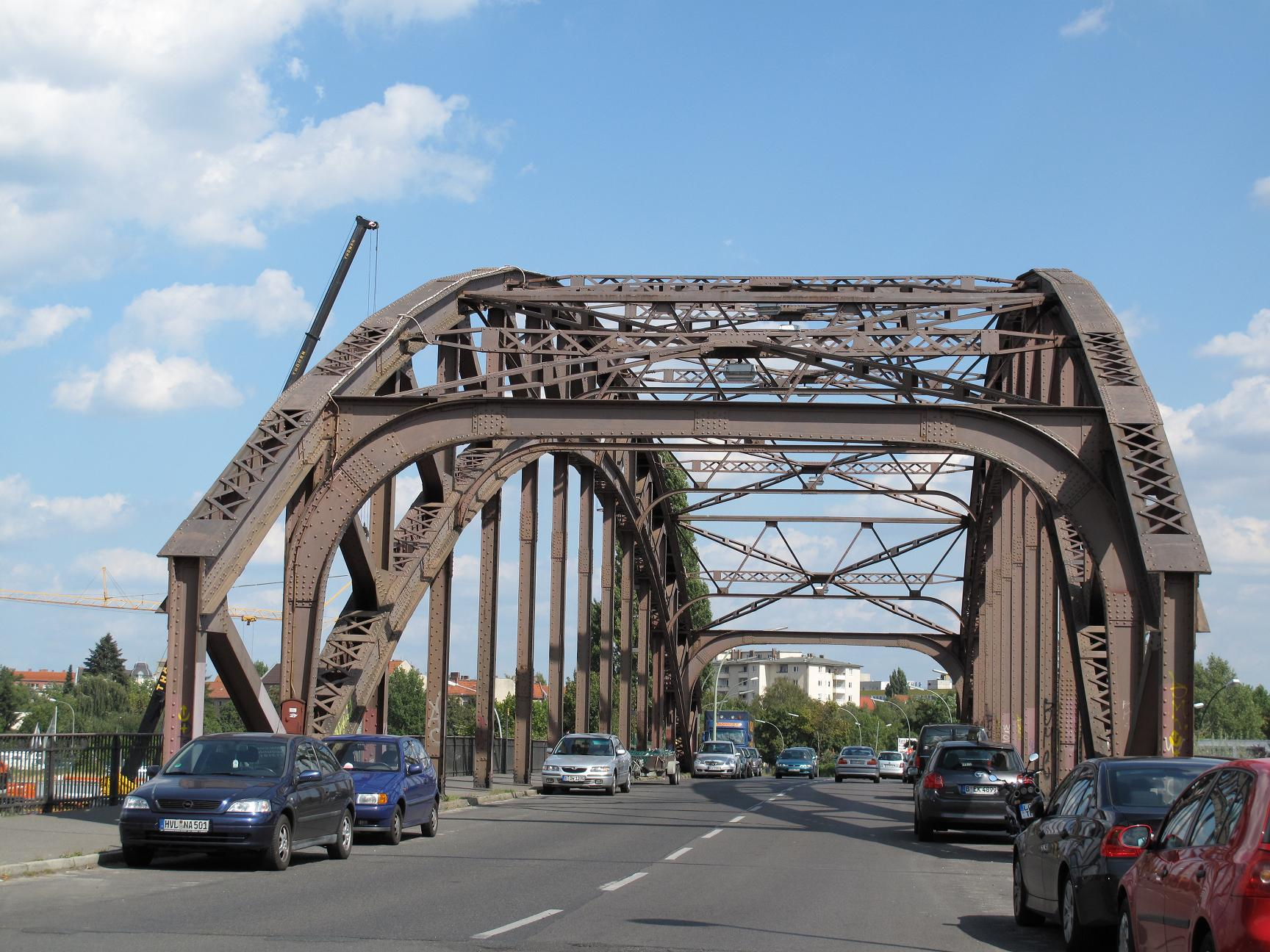
- Schulenburgbrücke
- Coordinates: 52.524331°N 13.204619°E
- Carries: Road traffic
- Crosses: Havel (Lower Havel Waterway)
- Locale: Wilhelmstadt, Berlin

Characteristics
- Design: Arch bridge, arch above the roadway, truss arch
- Total length: 79.10 m (259.5 ft)
- Width: 18.25 m (59.9 ft)

History
- Opened: 1909

Location
- Interactive map of Schulenburgbrücke

The Schulenburgbrücke is a steel arch bridge with a central roadway and wind bracing in the Berlin district of Wilhelmstadt in the Spandau borough, spanning the Lower Havel Waterway. It is listed in the list of cultural heritage monuments in Spandau with object documentation no. 09085791.

== Location ==
In connection with the expansion of the Berlin–Stettin major shipping route and the Spandau Lock, the Havel was straightened here, creating a flood-free island between the old Havel arm and the regulated river. Between 1906 and 1911, the Spandau South Harbor was built in Spandau along the newly created main arm of the Havel on a 160,000 m^{2} site. The Schulenburgstraße runs on a dam between the two parts of the harbor. The steel truss arch bridge completed in 1909 in riveted steel construction connects the Schulenburgstraße east of the Havel with Götelstraße and Weißenburger Straße.

The navigable channel of the federal waterway is 68 m wide under the bridge. The bridge has two driving lanes and two parking lanes.

== Future ==
Due to existing structural damage, the bridge is no longer maintainable in its current design according to the Berlin Senate Department for the Environment, Mobility, Consumer and Climate Protection. In its meeting on 20 July 2021, the Berlin Senate approved 35.7 million euros for a replacement new build at the same location. According to the tender dated 15 January 2023 titled "Replacement construction of the Schulenburgbrücke and intersection reconstruction", the new build is planned between the 1st quarter of 2025 and the 1st quarter of 2028.

== Bibliography ==
- Hans-J. Uhlemann: Berlin und die Märkischen Wasserstraßen. Transpress Verlag, Berlin 1987, ISBN 3-344-00115-9.
- Schriften des Vereins für europäische Binnenschifffahrt und Wasserstraßen e.V. Various years. WESKA (Westeuropäischer Schifffahrts- und Hafenkalender), Binnenschifffahrts-Verlag, Duisburg-Ruhrort. OCLC 48960431
