= Schöneweide =

Schöneweide may refer to:

== Places ==
Germany:

- Schöneweide, a suburban area of Berlin divided into the localities of Niederschöneweide and Oberschöneweide
  - Niederschöneweide, a locality of the Berliner district of Treptow-Köpenick
  - Oberschöneweide, a locality of the Berliner district of Treptow-Köpenick
- Schöneweide, a civil parish of the municipality of Nuthe-Urstromtal (Brandenburg)

== Infrastructures ==
- Berlin Schöneweide, a railway station in Berlin (Germany)
- Berlin Betriebsbahnhof Schöneweide, a railway station in Berlin (Germany)
