= Stößensee Bridge =

Steel truss bridge in Berlin, Germany

B 2 B 5 Stößensee Bridge
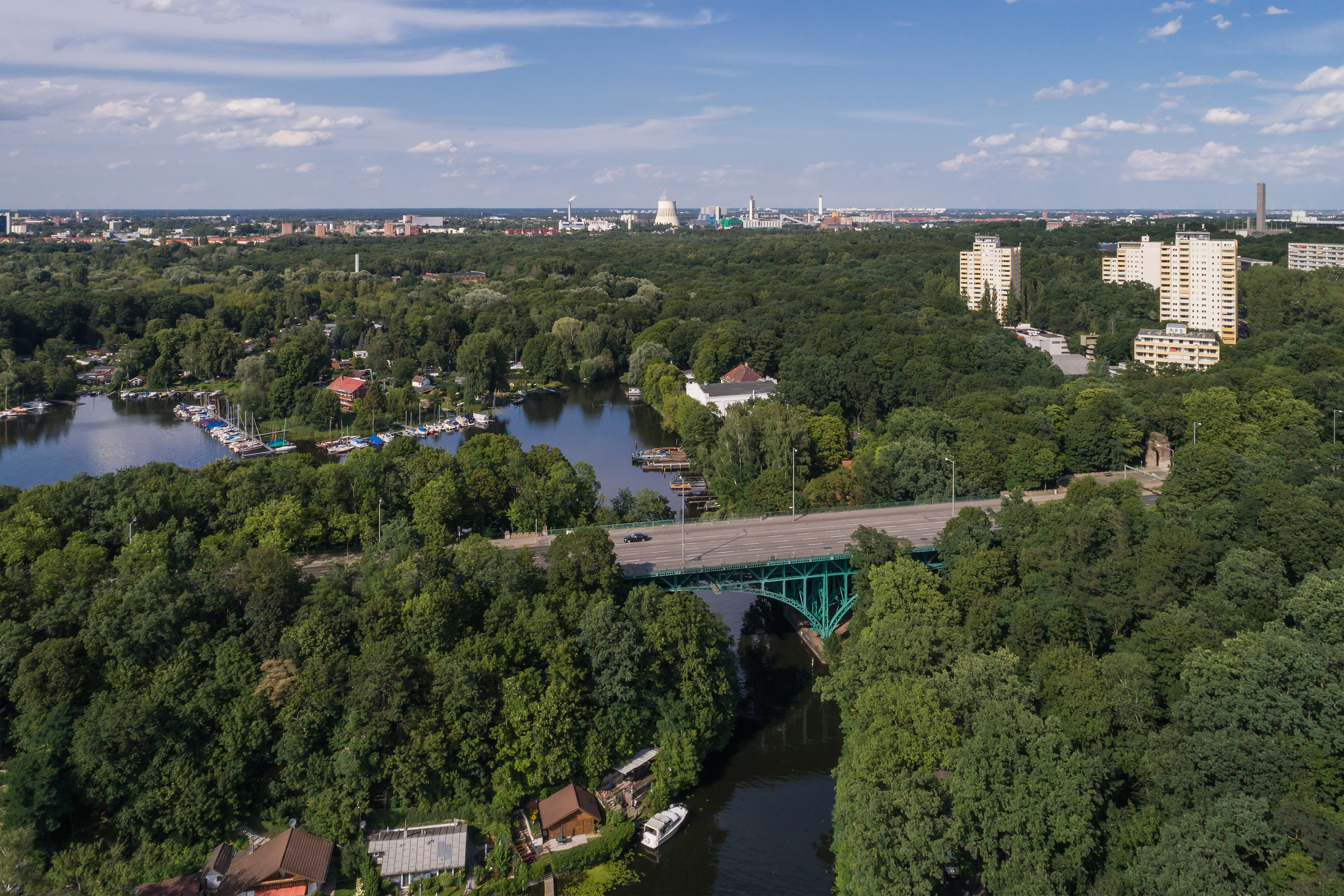
- Coordinates: 52°30′33″N 13°12′53″E
- Carries: Heerstraße (Bundesstraße 2/5)
- Crosses: Stößensee, Havelchaussee
- Locale: Berlin-Wilhelmstadt (on the border to Berlin-Westend)
- Begins: 1908
- Ends: 1909
- Named for: Karl Bernhard

Characteristics
- Material: Steel truss bridge
- Total length: around 100 m
- Width: 24 m (roadway and sidewalks)
- Height: approx. 20 m
- Capacity: 500 kg/m² (assumed load on roadway and sidewalks)

History
- Construction cost: 850,000 Mark (plus dam 550,000 marks)

Location
- Interactive map of B 2 B 5 Stößensee Bridge

The Stößenseebrücke is a steel truss bridge over the Stößensee and the Havelchaussee in the Berlin district of Spandau. The listed bridge from 1908 to 1909 is part of Heerstraße (federal highway 2/5) and connects the Spandau district of Wilhelmstadt with the Westend district of Charlottenburg-Wilmersdorf. The biggest technical and financial problem during the construction of the Heerstraße was bridging the Havel lowland, which includes the Stößensee, an old arm of the Havel. From several options, including an additional 250-meter-long bridge over the Scharfe Lanke, the planners opted for a route that could manage with two bridges – over the Havel and the Stößensee. With regard to the variants of the Stößensee bridge, the "small" solution with a dam embankment and a bridge around 100 meters long was chosen instead of a bridge over the entire lake. The bridge consists of a system of cantilever girders with connected towing girders and has a span of around 50 meters. It was designed by civil engineer Karl Bernhard.

== Bridging the Havel lowlands ==
Together with the Frey Bridge 800 meters to the west, which crosses the Havel, which was canalized in this area in 1880/1881, the Stößensee Bridge spans the waters of the Havel lowlands. The Stößensee is a bulge of old Havel arms, the remains of which are preserved in the area of the Tiefwerder Wiesen with the Faulen See, the Hohlen Weg and the main ditch. The eastern shore of Stößensee rises towards Grunewald, the western shore towards Pichelswerder – both part of the north-western foothills of the Teltow Plateau, which borders the Havel to the west. The original soft-ice glacial Rinnsee lake, or the later Havel branch, had dug into the edge of the plateau, so that the bridge height of around 25 meters, which is unusual for Berlin conditions, had to be built. For landscape planning reasons and to save costs and avoid having to bridge the entire 350-meter-long Stößensee, the Stößensee was filled in with a dam from the Pichelswerder and divided in two except for a channel that was kept open. Beyond the division of the lake, the embankment and the bridge connected the former island of Pichelswerder to the western land and turned the Werder into today's peninsula.

== Planning ==
=== Part of the Döberitzer Heerstraße, Bauherr ===
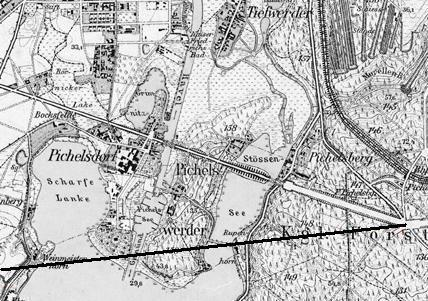
Route of the Heerstraße through the Havel lowlands with a bend at Scholzplatz on a map from around 1910. The lower black line shows the design line (according to Karl Bernhard) with a dead straight continuation without a bend, which would have required bridging the Scharfe Lanke as well.

The bridge was part of the overall Döberitzer Heerstraße project, which was built between 1903 and 1911 as an extension of Kaiserdamm as a direct link from Berlin Palace via the towns of Charlottenburg and Spandau, which were independent until their incorporation into Greater Berlin in 1920, to the Döberitz military training area. The east–west road comprises today's streets Unter den Linden, Straße des 17. Juni, Bismarckstraße, Kaiserdamm, Heerstraße and, after the Berlin city limits, Hamburger Chaussee in Dallgow-Döberitz. The road, built for military reasons, was public from the outset and opened up the western Grunewald forest and Pichelswerder for Berlin excursion traffic.

At the time of construction, the site of the bridge belonged to the Grunewald-Forst estate district (partly merged into the Heerstraße estate district in 1914) in the district of Teltow. While the military, finance and forestry treasury as well as Berlin, Charlottenburg, Spandau, the district of Teltow, the district of Osthavelland and some municipalities were financially involved in the overall project, the Stößensee Bridge was largely financed by the forestry treasury, which the Berlin Monument Database lists as the bridge's builder.

=== Variants and costs ===
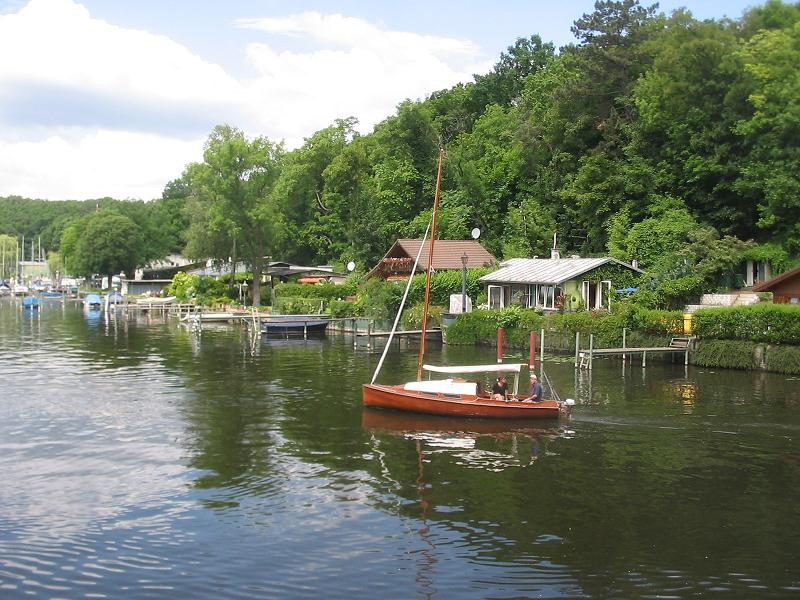
Overgrown southern flank of the embanked dam, Pichelswerder in the background on the left, view to the northwest.

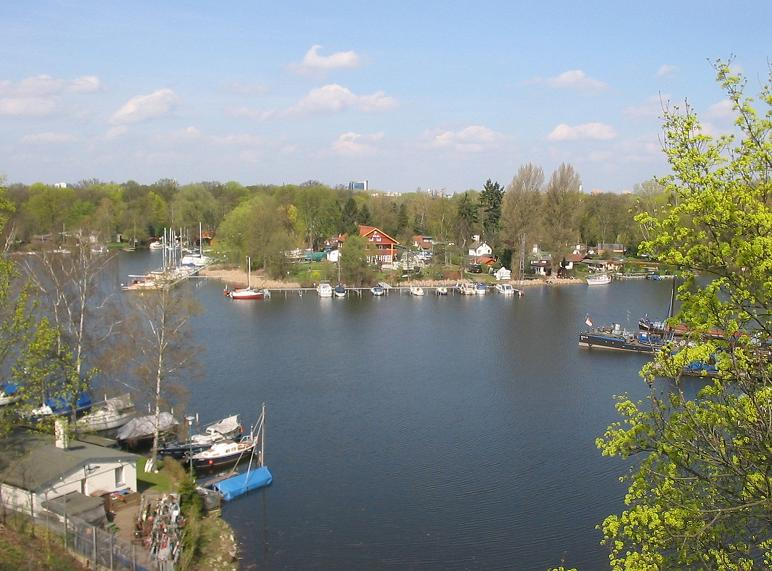
View of the northern part of Lake Stößensee from the bridge.

The otherwise dead straight east–west axis of the entire street makes a single bend and turns slightly to the northwest at Scholzplatz. The route supposedly drawn by Kaiser Wilhelm II using a ruler could not be adhered to for cost reasons, which were due to the difficulties of bridging the Havel lowlands. The dead straight continuation would not only have required bridging the Havel and Stößensee, but also the Scharfe Lanke. A 250-metre-long bridge would have had to be built here. The costs for this variant were estimated at 16.9 million marks, ten million of which were accounted for by the Scharfe Lanke bridge alone. A slimmed-down version with embankments in all the waterways touched and shorter bridges would still have cost 11.2 million marks. The chosen variant with the slightly bent route left the Scharfe Lanke to the south untouched. Although the road, which simply continued straight ahead after the bend, reached the Döberitz military training area at a different point than planned, the deviation seemed justifiable to everyone involved in view of the significantly reduced costs and other advantages. The Stößensee Bridge including the dam and the Frey Bridge cost a comparatively low 2.54 million marks. The Stößensee Bridge accounted for 850,000 marks and the dam for 550,000 marks.

Both the planners involved in the road construction and the bridge engineers endeavored to make the impact on nature as gentle as possible and to affect the landscape as little as possible. According to Adolf Frey, the decision in favor of the small Stößensee bridge with the dam instead of a large bridge over the entire lake was made for landscape planning reasons, after the senior civil engineer Hoßrat had made sketches showing the effects of the variants on the landscape. According to these sketches, a "dam, if it was built in the style of the adjacent banks with foreshore and planted accordingly, seemed to have less of an impact on the landscape than a [large] bridge." Excavated material from the army road and from the widening of a nearby valley was used for the dam, which was around 350 meters long and 125 meters wide.

=== Problems with dam construction ===
The above information comes from articles published in 1911 by the bridge designer Karl Bernhard and the head of Heerstraße construction, the Charlottenburg Privy and Chief Building Councillor Adolf Frey (the neighboring Frey Bridge, which until then had been called the Havel Bridge, was named after Frey in 1913). There appear to have been problems with the construction of the dam that the two parties involved in the project did not mention. The morning edition of the Berliner Tageblatt reported on March 1, 1907:

"Fifty meters of dam sunk. The construction of the Döberitzer Heeresstraße seems to have found an unfathomable opponent in the Stößensee. The gravel embankment built in this swampy recess of the Havel had already sunk repeatedly."
– Berliner Tageblatt, morning edition, March 1, 1907.

Four years after the dam was completed, the local politician, historian and local historian Ernst Friedel noted that the planners might have opted for a longer bridge if they had known about the problems and the actual costs of backfilling:

"They were thoroughly mistaken about the subsoil conditions of this ancient, rotten and overgrown lake. If one had known that solid ground could only be found at the enormous depth of 35 meters, and that the burdened embankment on both sides had been constantly rising for months before one could stop and tame the escape of the pressed up mud masses with pile and fascine works, one might have preferred a longer bridge as cheaper."
– Ernst Friedel: Döberitzer Heerstraße, 1913.

In total, the embankment required around one million m³ of soil. The digested sludge masses were mixed with water to form a flowing slurry and pushed through hoses into the northern, silted-up part of the lake.

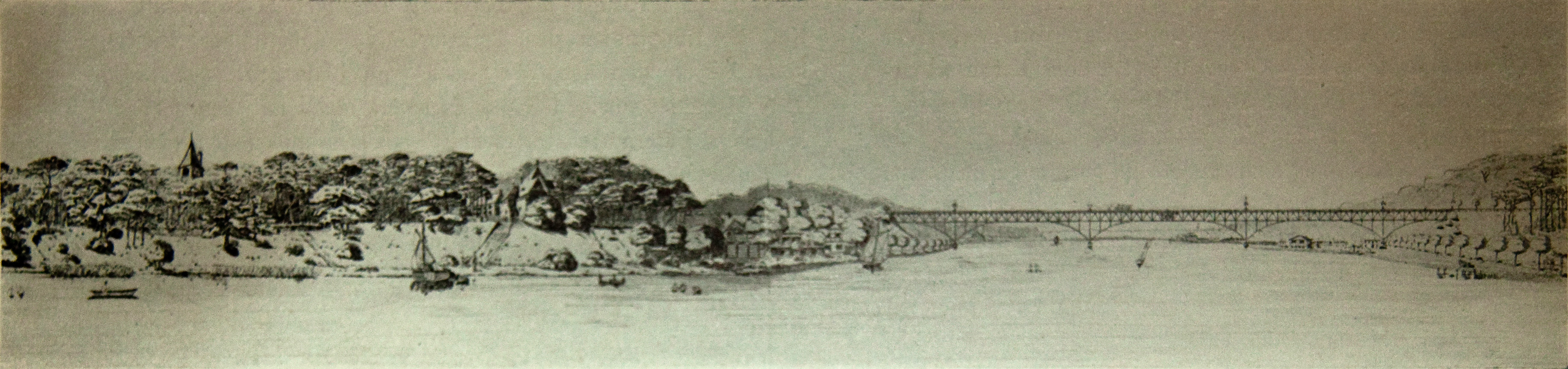
Project sketch by Karl Bernhard for bridging the Stößensee without a dam and with a straight continuation of the Heerstraße. Pichelswerder on the left, Rupenhorn on the right, where the road would have met the Stößensee in this variant.

== Construction and maintenance ==
=== Bridge system ===
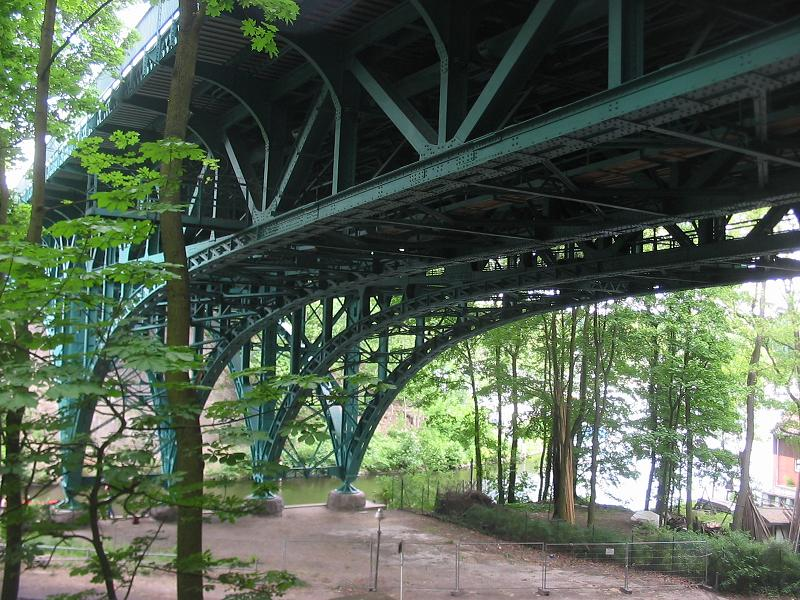
Substructure of the bridge (view towards the dam).

Inspired by the road bridges in Paris during his visit to the 1900 World Exhibition, Karl Bernhard went on to design "pleasing iron bridges without architects", the lines of which were to be created only "through the interaction of static and aesthetic aspects". For the Treskow Bridge in 1903, he developed a trussed arch with a tie beam and suspended central span, which formed the supporting members of the bridge with iron girders under the side arches. While he also used this system for the Stubenrauch Bridge and the neighboring Frey Bridge, Kaiser Wilhelm II chose a different variant for the Stößensee Bridge from several of Bernhard's proposals: a system of cantilever girders with connected towing girders.

"The opening on the land side was spanned by a truss girder, which rests on a masonry pier on the land slope and on a pier founded on a pile grid in the shoreline and extends a cantilever girder over the opening on the sea side. A towing beam is suspended at the end of this cantilever beam, which can follow the lowering of the embankment and can later be screwed back up to the correct position as required via its embankment-side support. When the cantilever girder is fully loaded, low tensile stresses arise on the landside support; almost the total bridge load [...] then rests on the middle support."
– Adolf Frey: Döberitzer Heerstraße, 1911.

=== Construction ===
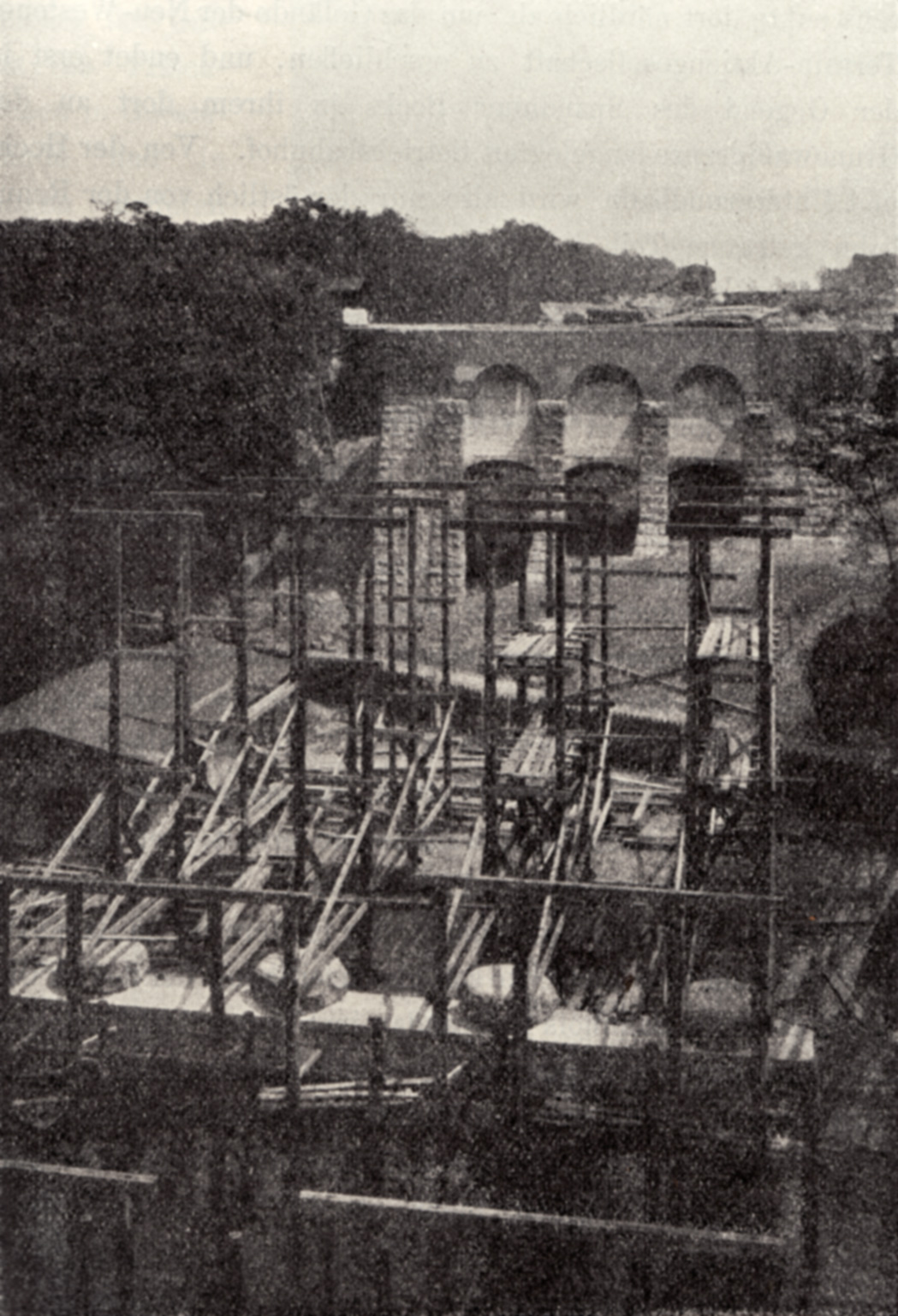
View of the land pier during construction in 1908/1909 (in the foreground the four round support stones of the central girder).

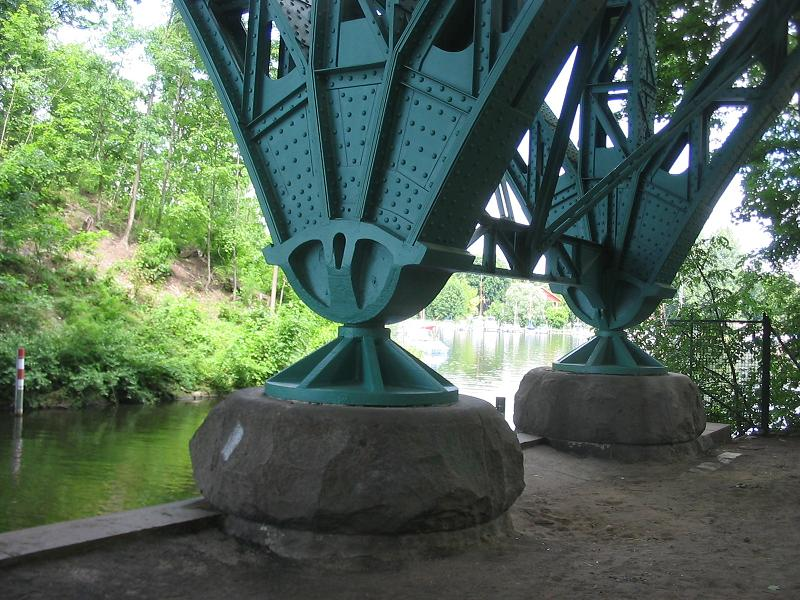
Zwei der vier Auflager des Mittelpfeilers

The bridge support on the Grunewald and embankment side resulted in a height of around 20 meters above mean water level for the upper edge of the carriageway, so that the supporting structure could be arranged under the carriageway, which has a one-sided gradient of 1:200. The fixed bearings of the central girder are designed as tilting bearings and consist of an upper saddle piece and the lower bearing body with the spherical trunnion. The height of the embankment support can be adjusted by up to 20 cm if the fill should settle. The designers used a finger construction to adjust the Grunewald support for changes of up to ± 14 cm due to the expected movements of the embankment support. The cantilever is 29.17 meters, resulting in a span of 20.83 meters for the towing girders. The four main girders run parallel to the roadway as truss girders in the upper chord and only in the middle section of the lower chord. The infill consists of strut trusses. The lower chord is strongly curved for "aesthetic reasons". "The eye of the beholder" should follow its clear lines.

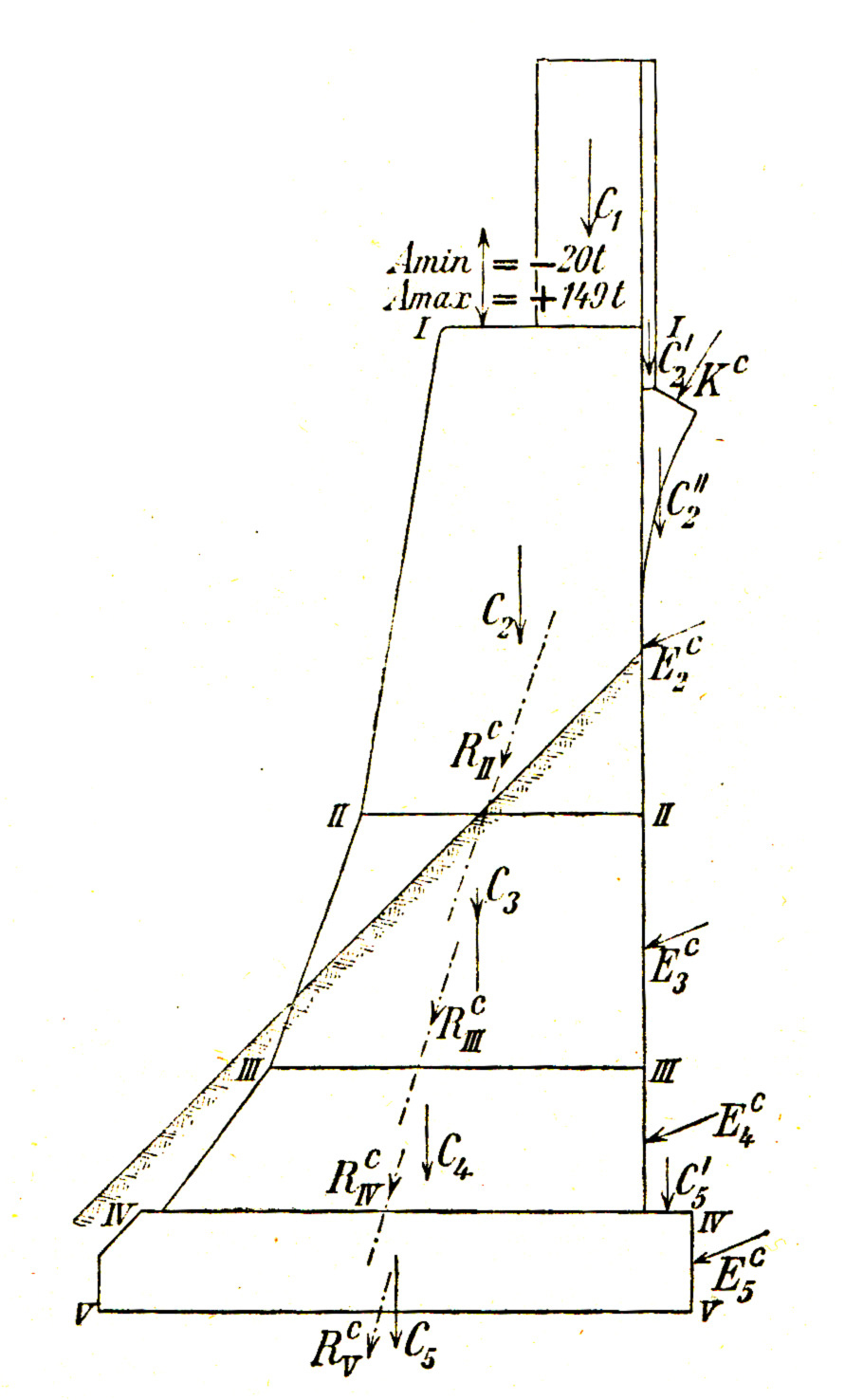
Section through the land pier.

The mighty Grunewald pillar consists of four supporting pillars stiffened by reinforced concrete vaults, which in turn support the earth. The pillar is largely clad with rough embossed granite and partly paved with boulders. At the bridgehead, it widens out into a viewing platform. The end piers on the embankment are in three parts, carry the bridge bearings and support the backfill. As the sandy embankment side does not form a fixed support point, the main load falls on the central pillar, which stands in the middle of the approximately 100-metre-long section next to the open shipping channel. It carries a total load of 3,900 tons, which is distributed over piles set into the ground at one-metre intervals, each carrying a load of 20 tons. The foundation base rests on the piles, which are around 3.14 meters below mean water level (29.81 m above sea level) and around 2.30 meters below low water level (28.97 m above sea level). The bank has a height of two meters and the round support stones, whose upper edge is 1.09 meters above high water (31.25 m above sea level), have a diameter of 2.43 meters. Brickwork on the central pillar was out of the question to protect the natural surroundings and keep the view clear. It was therefore formed from four cage arches with three centers, which initially rise steeply from the low-lying bearing and then merge tangentially into the lower chords of the truss girders, which rise slightly at the ends. The four main girders are spaced 5.85 meters apart. The outer main girders support the footpaths on cantilever arms, while the roadway is suspended from the inner main girders on short cantilever arms. The total road width is 24 meters, four of which are for the footpaths and 16 for the carriageway. For the main girders, Bernhard originally assumed a load of 500 kg/m^{2} for the carriageway and footpaths.

The supporting structure was made of river iron, the bearings, joints and expansion devices of cast iron. The substructure was built by Aktiengesellschaft für Hoch- und Tiefbau, Frankfurt/Main, the superstructure by the Berlin company Belter und Schneevogel. Construction of the bridge began in 1908 and was completed a year later. On the two sidewalks on the Charlottenburg side, two massive granite gates announce the bridge. They open up steep steps that lead down the slope to the Havelchaussee and the lake (there is a narrow sliding lane for bicycles next to the southern steps). The Havelhöhenweg also begins at the southern portal.

Bernhard also retained his concept of achieving aesthetics without architectural additions for the Stößensee Bridge. The structural "design of the cantilevers in connection with the main girders, the edge girders with the railings, i.e. the entire footpaths projecting over the main girders" illustrates, as Bernhard writes, the "uniform architectural effect of the pure iron construction without architectural additions".

=== Reconstruction, repairs and transit traffic ===
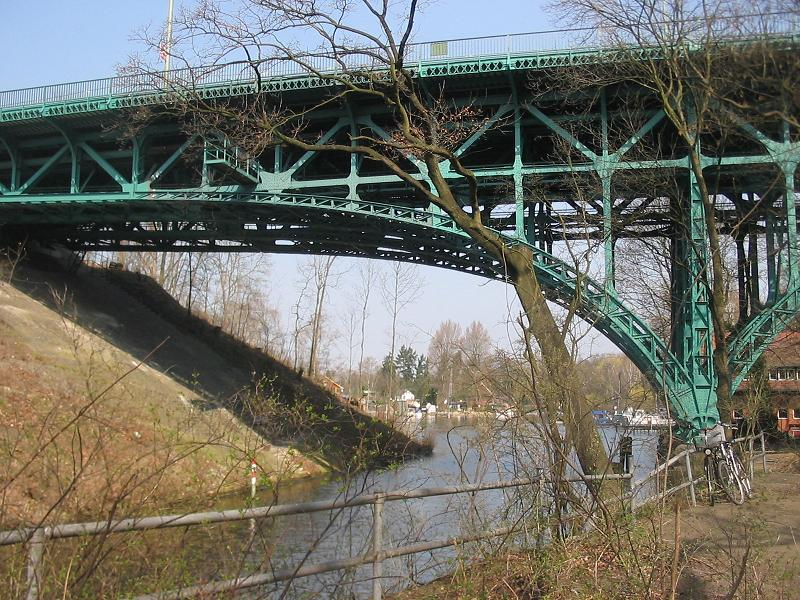
Bridging the remaining shipping channel of the two-part Stößensee (left: embankment fill, central pillar of the bridge, right: Grunewald side, view to the north-west).

The bridge was destroyed during the Second World War. Like the Freybrücke, it was most likely blown up by the German Wehrmacht in 1945 to prevent the Soviet troops from advancing further towards Berlin. Reconstruction took place between 1948 and 1951. According to the entry in the state monument list, the bridge was rebuilt in 1959. From July to October 2001, the state of Berlin carried out repair work because the south-western base had started to lean. In addition, the paved embankment cone in this area showed settlement cracks and deformations. Traffic on the bridge was able to continue during this time, albeit somewhat restricted.

At the time of the division of Germany, transit traffic to Hamburg flowed over the Stößensee Bridge. Before the expansion of the Autobahn 24, the connection was also the only transit route in the form of a country road, so that it could also be used by cyclists between West Berlin and the former federal territory. Today, Heerstraße is one of many entry and exit roads that connect Berlin city center with the western districts and the surrounding areas of Brandenburg, including the Havelpark shopping center in Dallgow-Döberitz and the factory outlet center in Elstal, as well as the Berlin freeway ring (junction 26 – Berlin-Spandau). The continuation of the Heerstraße as the B 5 in the federal state of Brandenburg is called Hamburger Chaussee. It leads into Havelland, crosses the Berlin ring road and runs via Hamburg to the Danish border. Currently (as of 2010) around 70,000 vehicles cross the Stößensee Bridge every day.

== Climbing ==
Climbers use the 20-metre-high stone wall of the Landpfeil for practice. Although the sport is not permitted, it was tolerated, at least as recently as 2011. However, climbing groups and clubs are advised to register at the Spandau police station. The grippy natural stone offers routes from 4 to 7+. Climbing in the lead is only possible to a limited extent due to the small number of pitons. There are rings at the bridgehead for top-rope belaying.

== Literature ==
Karl Bernhard: Stößensee and Havel bridges in the course of the Döberitzer Heerstraße. No. 4, 1911, pp. 321–358 (zlb.de).

- Adolf Frey: Döberitzer Heerstraße. No. 1, 1911, pp. 69–86.
- Döberitzer Heerstraße. In: Ernst Friedel (ed.): Groß Berliner Kalender, Illustriertes Jahrbuch 1913. Verlag von Karl Siegismund, Königlich Sächsischer Hofbuchhändler, Berlin 1913, pp. 291–295.
- Arne Hengsbach: The Berlin Army Road. A chapter in planning history. In: Der Bär von Berlin, Berlin 1960, F. 9, pp. 87–112.
- Peter Rode, Michael Günther: Berliner Verkehrsorte im Wechsel der Zeiten: The Pichelswerder and its bridges. 38th volume, issue 6 (November/December 2011), pp. 157–167.
- Werner Lorenz, Roland May, Hubert Staroste, with the assistance of Ines Prokop: Ingenieurbauführer Berlin. Michael Imhof Verlag, Petersberg 2020, ISBN 978-3-7319-1029-9, pp. 80–81.
