= Stubenrauchbrücke (Treptow-Köpenick district) =

Bridge in Berlin

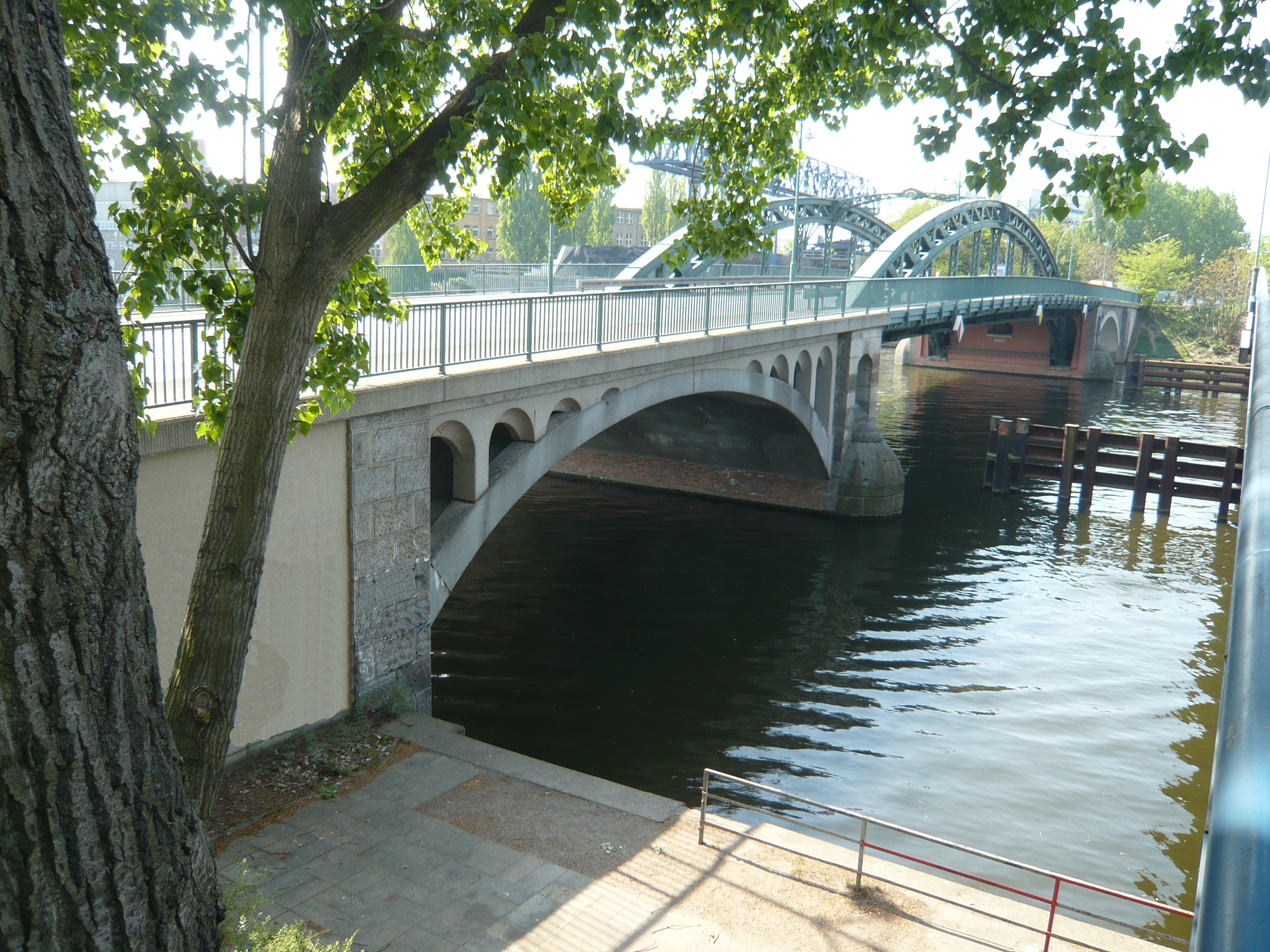
- Original bridge from 1908 after major renovation
- Coordinates: 52°27′44″N 13°30′23″E
- Crosses: Spree
- Locale: Treptow-Köpenick district, Oberschöneweide

Characteristics
- Total length: 123.5 m
- Width: 14.9m
- Height: Arch height from the road about 5.0 m
- Capacity: Bridge class 30/30

History
- Engineering design by: Civil engineer Karl Bernhard (1908), engineering company Gregull + Spang (1999)
- Construction start: July 1907
- Construction end: June 20, 1908, 1959: general repairs, August 23, 1999: basic repairs
- Construction cost: 133,000 Marks

Location
- Interactive map of Stubenrauchbrücke

The Stubenrauchbrücke (lit. English: Stubenrauch Bridge), built in 1908, is a three-arch iron truss bridge. In recent years, it has effectively become two separate bridges running parallel to each other, facilitating both vehicular and pedestrian traffic. This bridge links the Berlin neighborhoods of Oberschöneweide and Niederschöneweide, situated on either bank of the Spree River, within the Treptow-Köpenick district.

== History of the Spree Crossing ==
During the late 19th century, the growth of Oberschöneweide and Niederschöneweide was closely linked to the rapid expansion of Berlin's large-scale industry. The presence of railways and waterways provided favorable conditions for the establishment of industrial settlements. At the same time, however, constructing paths and roads and connecting them to the Chausseenetz of the district of Teltow became necessary. To create the first permanent link between the two banks of the Spree River, a chain ferry was established in 1885, and funded by the district.

The ferry connection operated until 1891 when it was replaced by a wooden bridge in 1890/1891. This bridge also accommodated the tracks of the Oberschöneweide industrial railroad (Bullenbahn), which connected seventeen newly established factories in Oberschöneweide to the Berlin-Görlitz railroad line. The 121-meter-long bridge over the Spree was a wooden truss structure with nine openings, with three in the middle serving as ship passages. In addition to this bridge, other Spree crossings were built around the same time, such as the Kaisersteg (1898, pedestrian bridge) and the Treskowbrücke (1904), which together helped to relieve traffic in Schöneweide. However, the wooden bridge quickly deteriorated and, after only ten years, a new fixed crossing was urgently needed. The district administration opted for a steel bridge constructed of three arches of unequal length, which also had to accommodate the tracks of the industrial railroad leading to the Oberschöneweide factories. The new construction led to re-routing streetcar lines operated by the Berlin Ostbahnhof exclusively over the neighboring Treskow Bridge. The bridge plans were developed by Berlin civil engineer Karl Bernhard, who was also responsible for the superstructure. Preparatory work began in 1905, and the entire construction costs were covered by the municipality. Before the new Stubenrauch Bridge was built, there was only the Kaisersteg for pedestrians to cross the Spree and the later Treskow Bridge for vehicles, but the latter was a rather dilapidated wooden structure at the time. When the new bridge was inaugurated, it was named Stubenrauchbrücke in honor of the former Teltow district administrator, Ernst von Stubenrauch.

== Arched bridge as a steel structure ==
The realized bridge with span widths of 21.5 m, 60 m, and 21.5 m was adapted to the requirement of the Spree navigation of a passage width of at least 50 m. The central large arch was built as an iron truss arch with a tension band in the central opening. The two arch sections were connected at their apex, which stood at a height of 7.90 meters. The side arches, also designed to accommodate navigation, were made of reinforced concrete to ensure stability while maintaining a filigree appearance that matched the main arch. All bridge abutments and piers were faced with granite. During the 1920s, the Stubenrauchbrücke faced significant structural demands, with up to 14 trains a day from the private connecting railroad operated by the Berlin tramway, sometimes with up to 130 axles, crossing the bridge. A stretching of the steel train band in the central span led to the closure of traffic on January 6, 1925. After the demolition of the deck and excavation of the truss arches, new tension bands and a new deck were installed from a substructure.

== Destruction and reconstruction after World War II ==
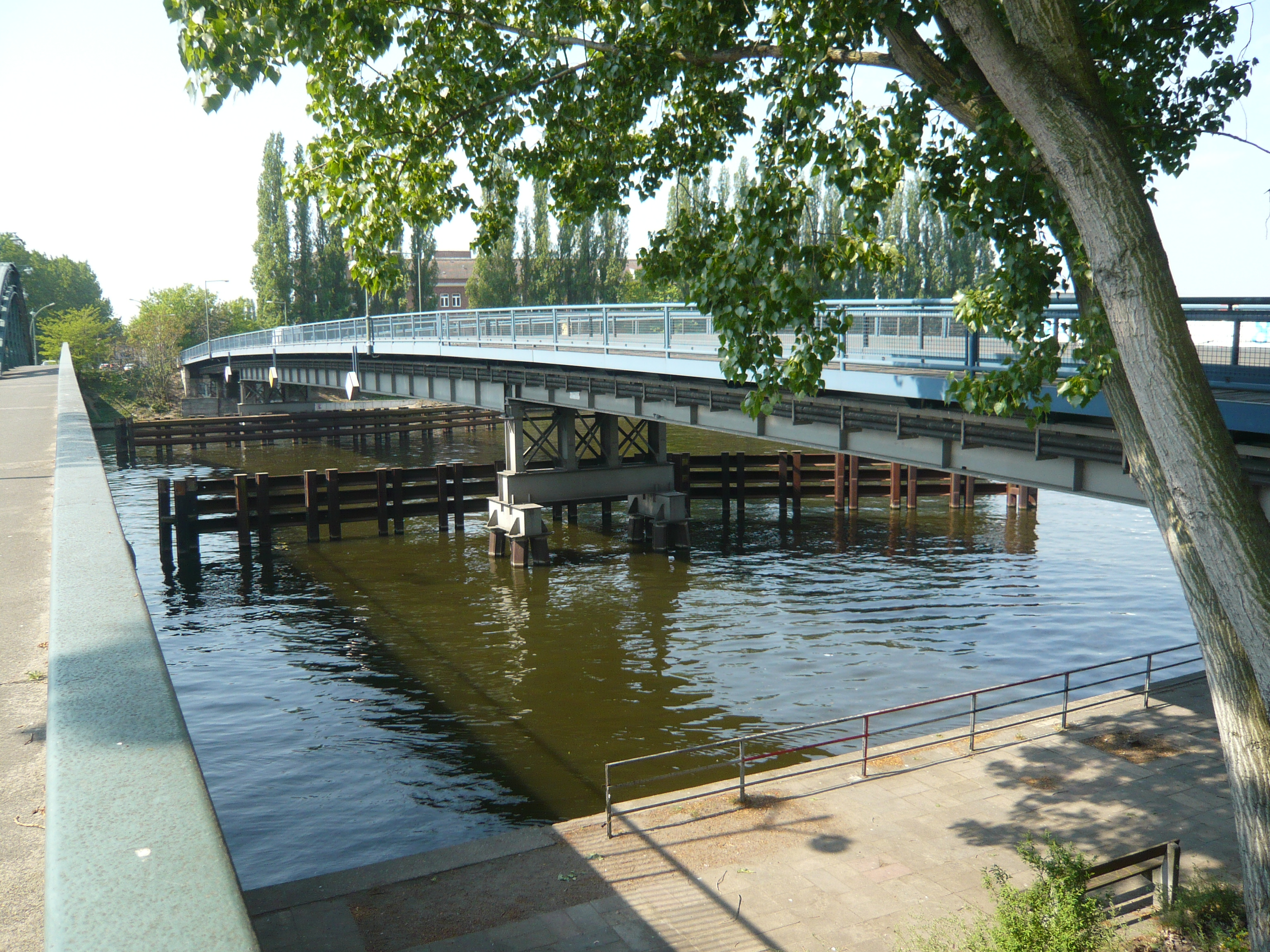
Makeshift bridge

Allied bombing at the end of World War II severely damaged the bridge by hitting the central and northern openings. Despite the damage, Soviet pioneers built a makeshift bridge over the northern span in 1945, and straightening work was carried out on the steel structure, allowing the bridge to remain in use during this period. After the war, the destruction of the Treskow Bridge resulted in the absence of a streetcar connection between Ober- and Niederschöneweide. To address this, streetcar tracks were laid across the Stubenrauchbrücke in 1947, although they were later removed in 1951 following the reconstruction of the Treskow Bridge. With the Treskow Bridge repaired, comprehensive restoration work was undertaken on the Stubenrauchbrücke, largely restoring its original appearance by 1959. Additionally, the operation of the industrial railroad across the bridge was discontinued at this time, leaving only car traffic to use the bridge. In 1969, the operating track was abandoned, and since 1971, north-south car traffic has been permanently diverted over the Stubenrauchbrücke. However, over the subsequent decades, traffic congestion in this area continued to increase.

In addition to the historic Stubenrauchbrücke, which has been a listed building since the 1980s, the Berlin Senate, which has been responsible for all of Berlin since the fall of the Wall, had a parallel reinforced concrete beam bridge built 20 meters downstream from the Spree in the early 1990s, which served as a makeshift construction for traffic between Ober- and Niederschöneweide. However, in 1994, both bridges had to be closed to truck traffic. Between 1998 and 1999, extensive repairs were carried out on the Stubenrauch Bridge. These renovations were funded by the Joint Task for Improvement of the Regional Economic Structure and the European Regional Development Fund, with a total cost of 12.5 million marks (equivalent to about 9.5 million euros in today's currency). Engineers from the firm Gregull + Spang were responsible for the project, which included reinforcing the metal structure by installing an orthotropic deck and replacing corroded metal components of the main opening. On the south side of the bridge, a new concrete arch was added to match the design of the northern bridge arch, based on historical plans. Additionally, several historic-style streetlights were installed in the middle section of the bridge.

As of 2022, vehicular traffic on the Stubenrauchbrücke flows in one lane in each direction, and the plan calls for the temporary bridge to be deconstructed.
