= Volkspark Wuhlheide =

Public forest- and recreation park in Berlin, Germany

- Pionierpark Ernst Thälmann (1950 – 1990)
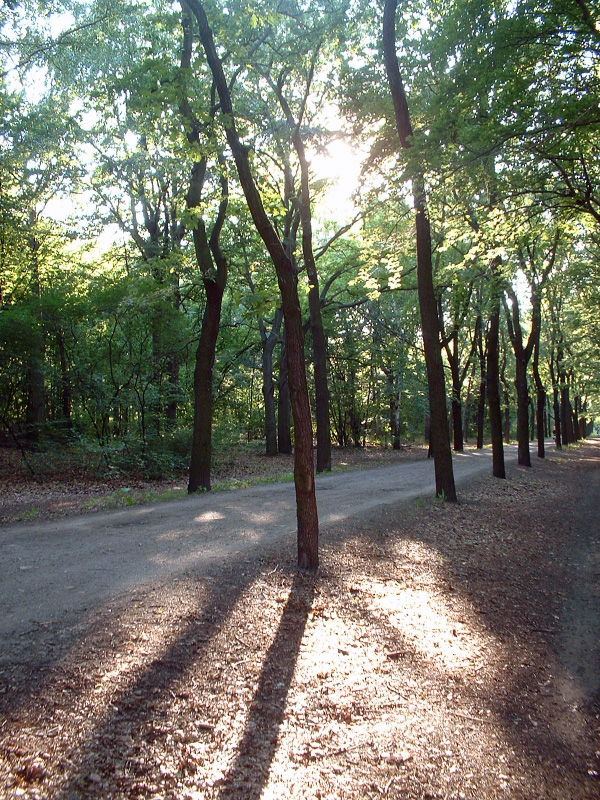
- Main pathway (Hauptweg) in Volkspark Wuhlheide

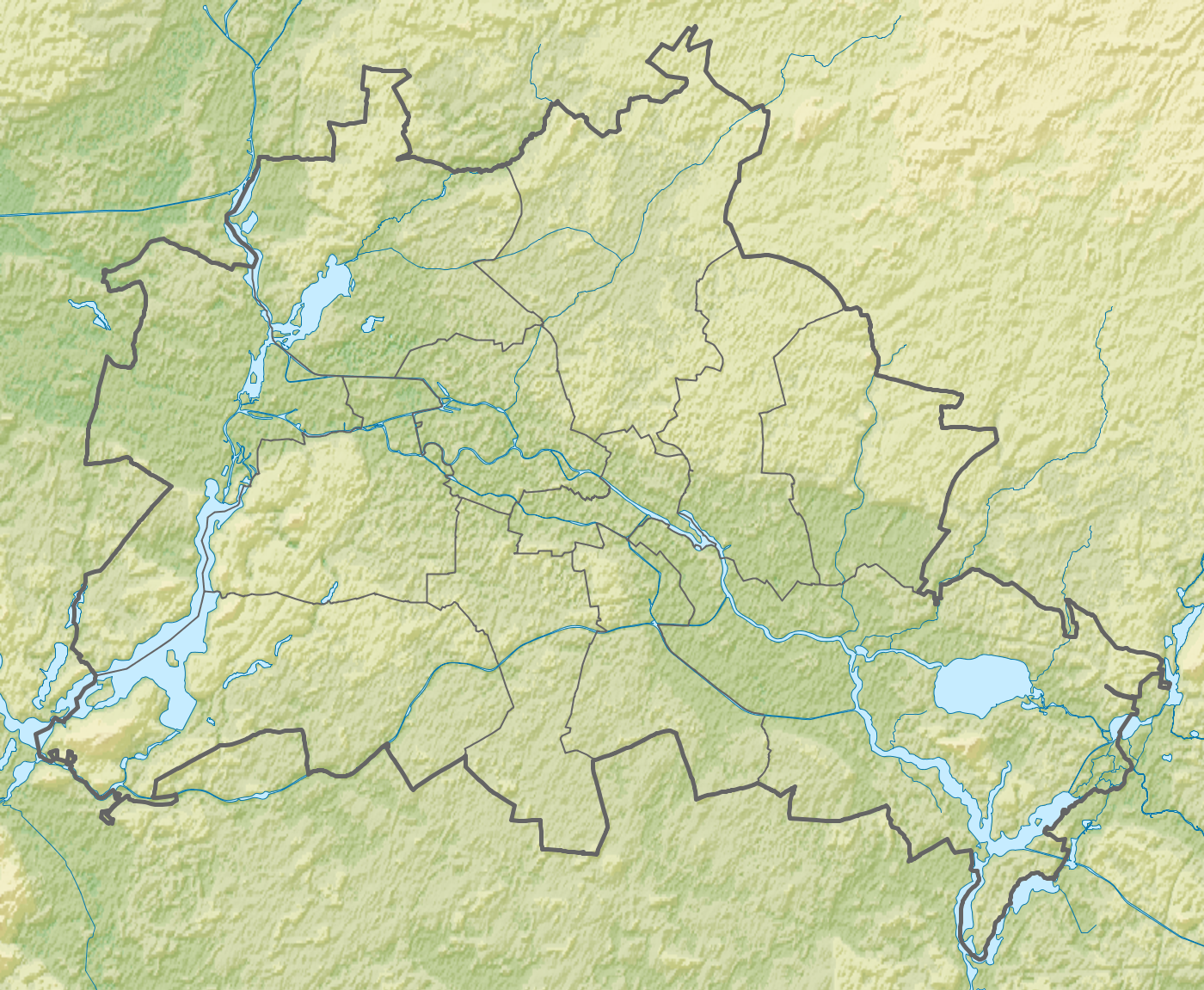
- Location within Berlin
- Type: Urban forest park
- Location: Oberschöneweide, Treptow-Köpenick, Berlin, Germany
- Coordinates: 52°28′07″N 13°31′24″E
- Created: 1920s–1932 (major layout)
- Operator: State of Berlin / Bezirksamt Treptow-Köpenick (park management)
- Status: Open all year

Volkspark Wuhlheide (often simply Wuhlheide) is a large public forest park in south eastern Berlin, Germany. Laid out mainly between the 1920s and 1932 under garden director Ernst Harrich, it combines woodland and designed recreation areas. During the former German Democratic Republic (GDR) period its eastern section operated as the youth oriented Pionierpark Ernst Thälmann (1950 – 1990). Within the park are the children’s park railway, the leisure and education complex now known as FEZ Berlin (opened in 1979 as the Pionierpalast; operating as FEZ since 1990), and the listed open air amphitheatre Parkbühne Wuhlheide.

== History ==
=== Origins (1920s to 1932) ===
The Wuhlheide forms part of a historic forest belt in Berlin’s east; in 1911 the Greater Berlin association acquired land in the area for drinking water purposes, with obligations to preserve forest and create a public park. After 1919 the Treptow gardens authority resumed planning a combined public forest and landscape park; the city assembly approved the project in 1922, and Ernst Harrich produced plans in 1923 (supplemented in 1924). Implementation continued until 1932, merging quiet woodland with open lawns and sports/play fields.

=== Soviet and GDR time (1950–1990) ===
War damage and subsequent Soviet military use altered parts of the landscape after 1945. From about 1950, following Soviet models, the eastern section was converted into the Pionier- und Kulturpark Ernst Thälmann (Pioneer's and Culture park Ernst Thälmann) for state youth work, including a children’s railway. The large open air stage (later Parkbühne Wuhlheide) was built on rubble mounds for the 3rd World Festival of Youth and Students in summer 1951; the opening ceremony took place on 27 July 1951 under (East) Berlin's mayor Friedrich Ebert. In 1979, the Pionierpalast Ernst Thälmann opened within the park as a central venue for youth education and leisure.

=== Since reunification ===
After 1990, restoration and reactivation of facilities progressed. The open air stage, protected as a garden monument, was renovated in 1996–1997 (architect Werner Weickenmeier), adding a permanent tented roof and modern visitor infrastructure; it reopened in June 1996. Since 1990, the former Pionierpalast has operated as the FEZ Berlin (Abbreviation for Freizeit- und Erholungszentrum; English: Leisure and Recreation Center), a major children's and youth complex. In May 2025 the FEZ complex was formally listed as a monument by the State Monuments Office (Landesdenkmalamt) Berlin.

== Name ==
The toponym refers to the stream Wuhle and the adjoining heath/forest. Administrative sources distinguish the broader landscape unit (forest and facilities) from the historic garden monument core.

== Features and attractions ==
- Park landscape and trails: The park combines woodland, meadows and designed gardens (including the historical terrace garden north of the Waldfriedhof), with extensive foot and cycle paths.
- Children's park railway: A narrow-gauge park railway operates seasonally across parts of the park and toward the S-Bahn connection.
- FEZ Berlin (complex opened 1979; FEZ since 1990): It is Europe's largest non-profit children’s, youth and family centre. It includes an orbitall space education centre, an Astrid Lindgren children's theater, and a children's cinema; the complex is a listed monument.
- Parkbühne Wuhlheide: Open air amphitheatre (built 1951; renovated 1996–1997) used for large concerts and events.
- Modellpark Berlin-Brandenburg: After the demolition of the Ernst-Thälmann-Stadion, the Modellpark Berlin-Brandenburg opened on the site in June 2007. It launched with about 45 architecture models at 1:25 and has since expanded to more than 80 exhibits within a landscaped setting.

== Gallery ==
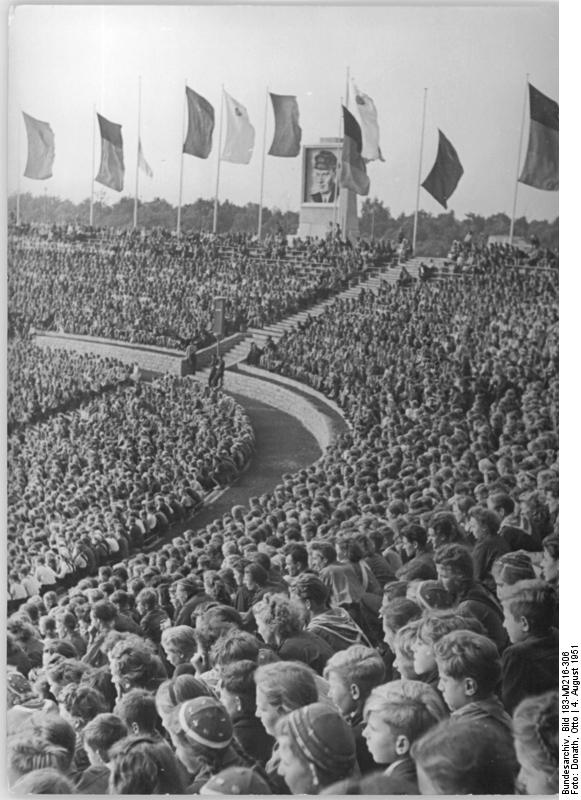
Opening of the new stadium area in the Pionierpark during the 1951 World Festival of Youth and Students.

== See also ==
- Parkbühne Wuhlheide
- Berlin Wuhlheide station
- List of parks and gardens in Berlin
