= Wuhlheide =

Urban forest in Berlin, Germany

Coordinates: 52.465°N 13.544°E

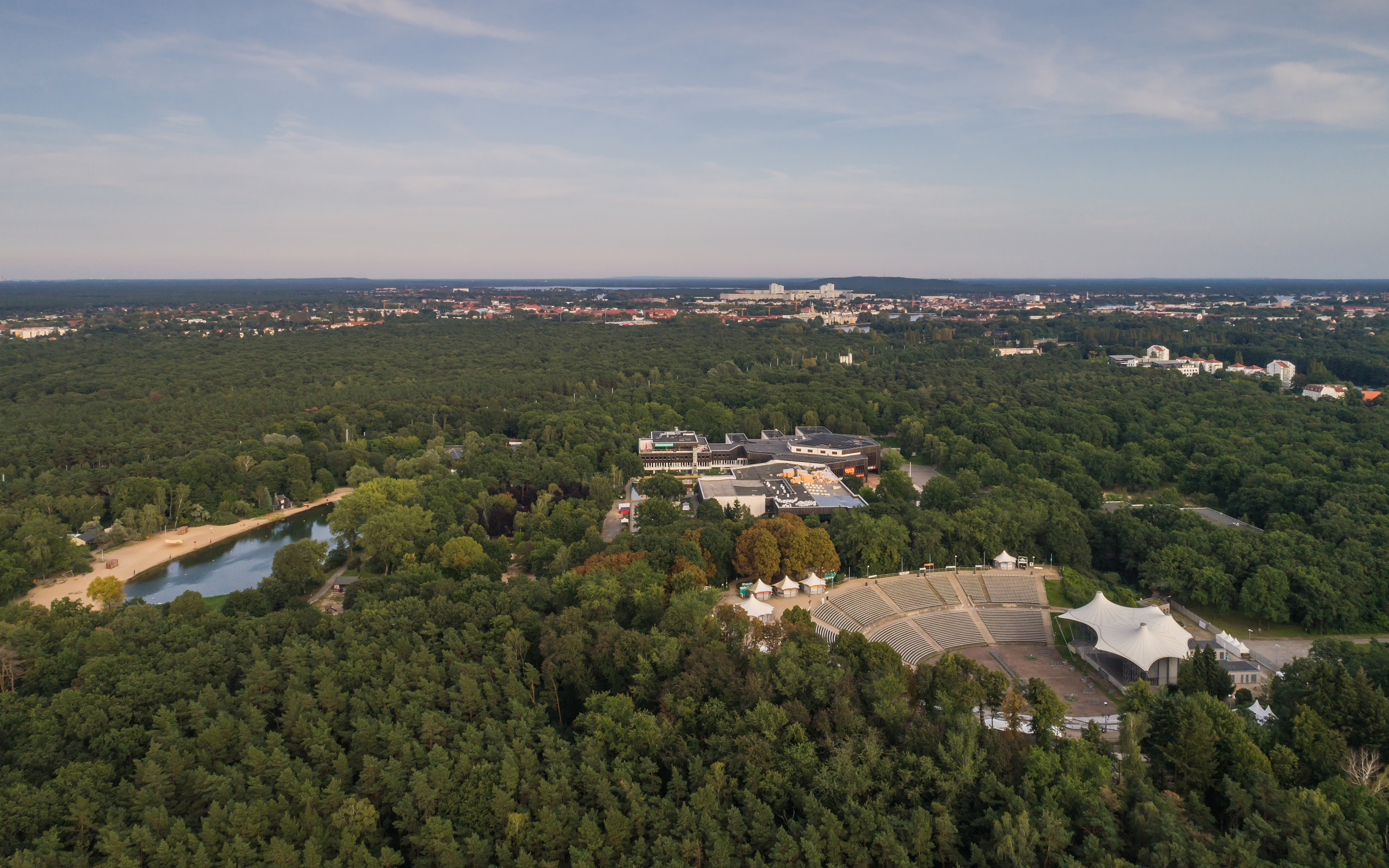

Wuhlheide is an urban forest in Berlin, named after the Wuhle river, that includes the following areas:

- Volkspark Wuhlheide
- Parkbühne Wuhlheide
- Waldfriedhof Oberschöneweide
- An education center

During World War II, multiple prisoner of war camps were established in the area.
