= Parkbühne Wuhlheide =

German performance venue

Coordinates: 52.4619°N 13.5453°E

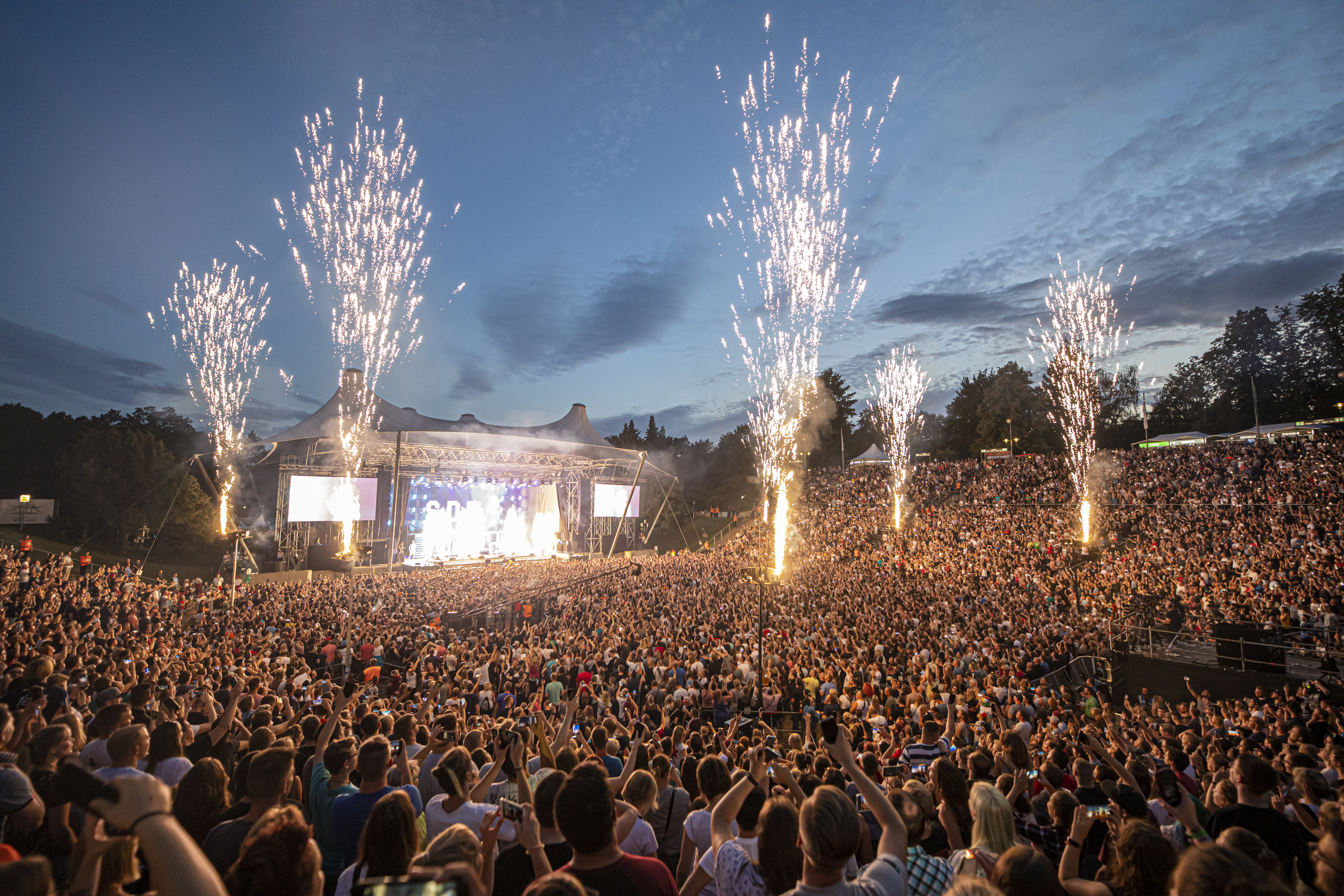
2019

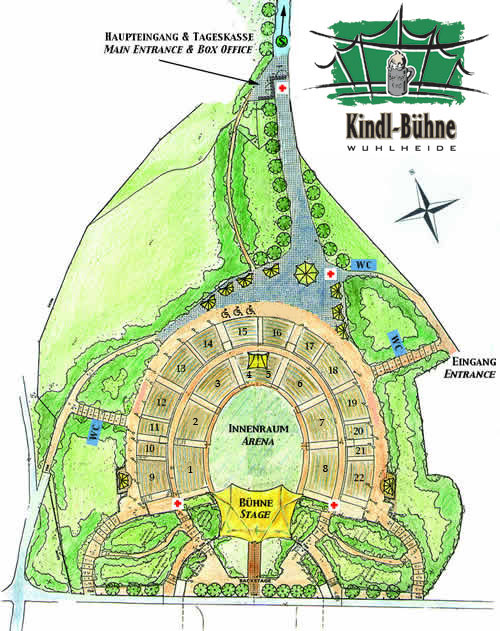
Layout of the Parkbühne Wuhlheide

The Parkbühne Wuhlheide ("Wuhlheide Park Stage") is a cultural heritage site in Berlin, Germany, that serves as an open-air performance venue in the shape of an amphitheater. It is part of Volkspark Wuhlheide ("Wuhlheide Public Park") in the Berlin-Oberschöneweide neighborhood in the district of Bezirk Treptow-Köpenick. The Kindl-Bühne has a non-seated spectator capacity of 17,000 and a seated capacity of 15,300. It is the second-largest open-air stage in Berlin, trailing only the Waldbühne in size.

== History ==
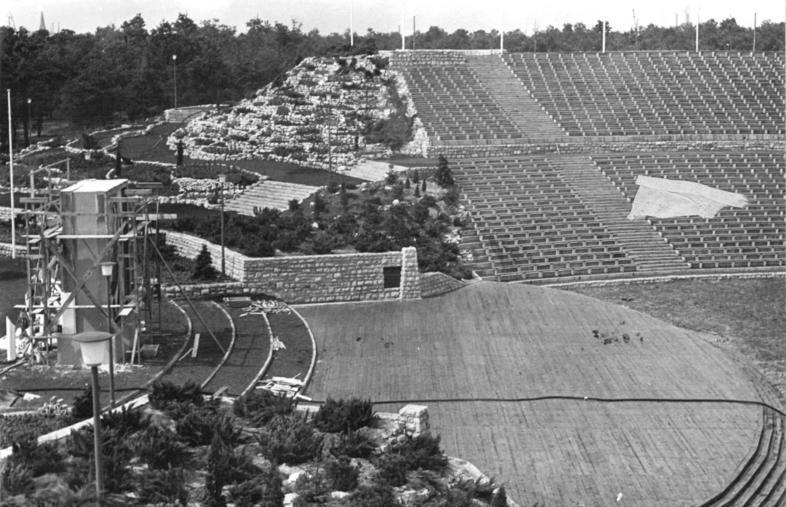
The open-air stage in 1951

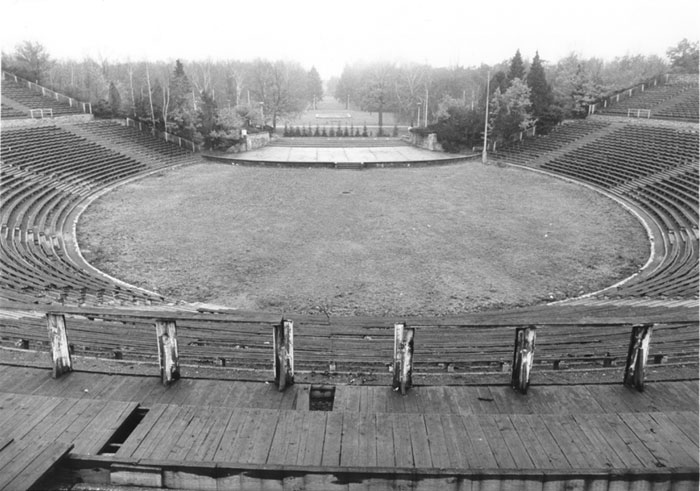
The open-air stage in 1986

Starting around 1950, parts of Volkspark Wuhlheide were remodeled into the Ernst Thälmann Pioneer Park, following Soviet models. The large open-air stage was built for the occasion of the third World Festival of Youth and Students in the summer of 1951 (opening ceremony on 27 July 1951 under Mayor Friedrich Ebert Jr.). It was erected on mounds of rubble, on which were laid terraced, oval-shaped rows of seats for approximately 20,000 visitors. In order to reach the upper ring of the wall from the outside and to reach the seats on the inside, extensive stairway systems were created. Necessary restrooms and adjacent buildings were built behind the walls in accordance with contemporary hygiene standards and knowledge. In the following years, a multitude of cultural and political events occurred at the venue.

At the beginning of the 1990s, the open-air stage was in such a decayed condition that it could hardly be used. Nevertheless, since 25 August 1990, it has been a monument under cultural heritage management in reunited Berlin.

== The stage today ==
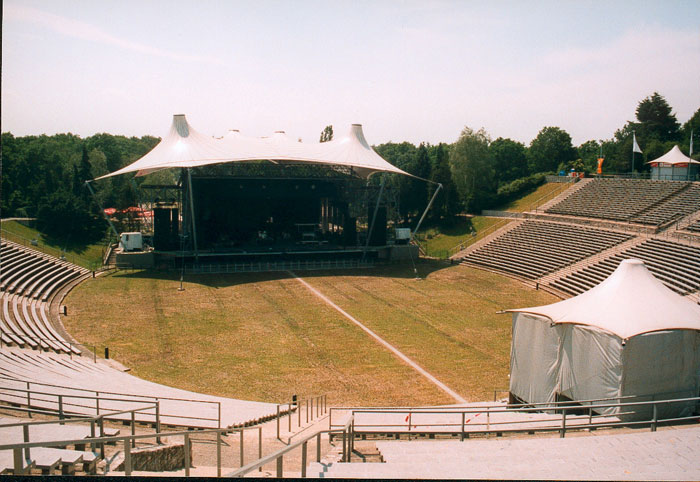
The Parkbühne Wuhlheide in 2000

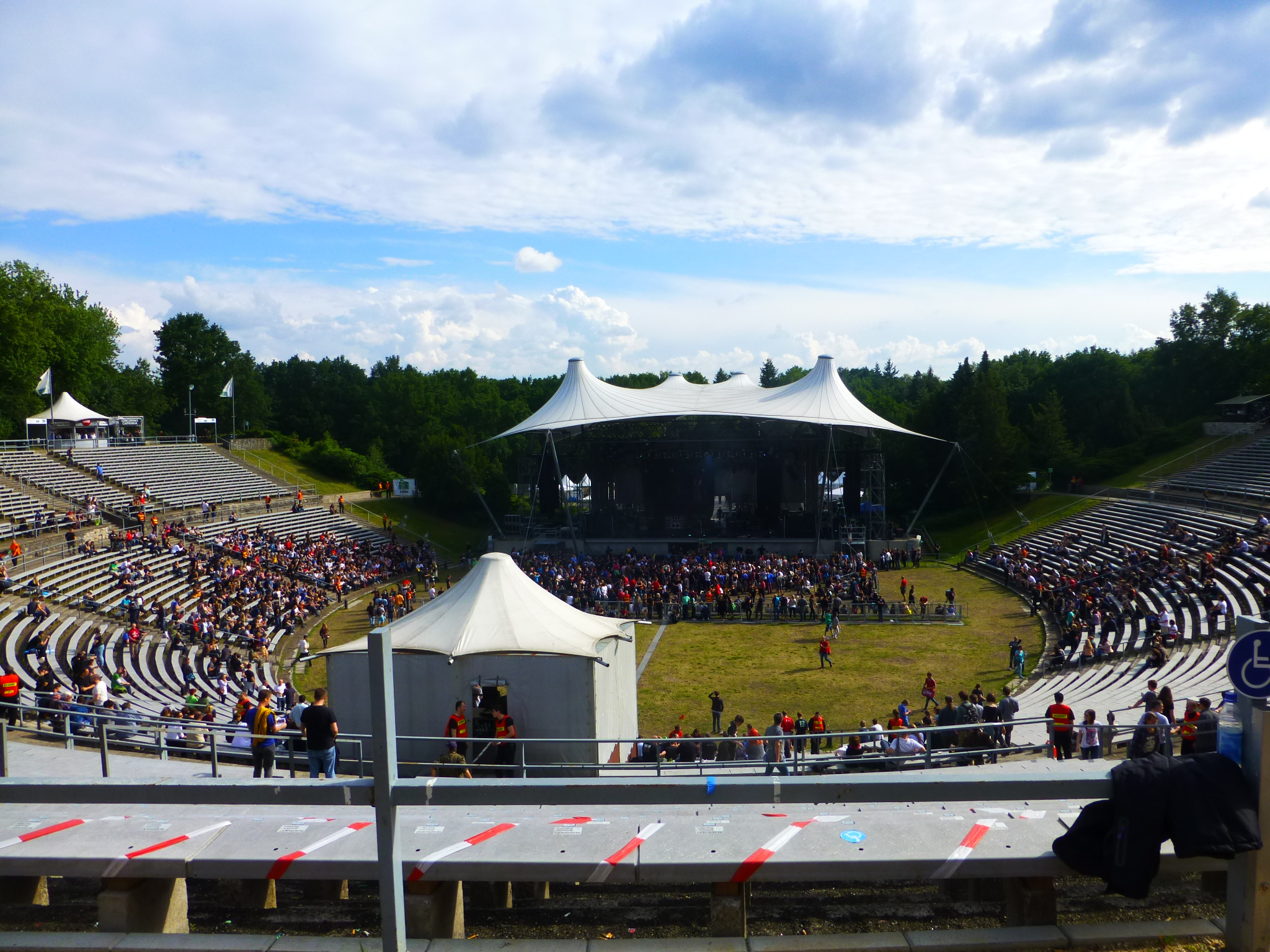
The Parkbühne Wuhlheide filling up for a concert by Pearl Jam in 2014

In 1996 and 1997, the venue was completely renovated and modernized. The stage area (with a playing area of 22.5m x 16m) received a permanent tent roof supported by a steel structure which can support up to 16 additional tons of light and sound equipment. Also, all necessary functional and adjacent facilities, as well as the infrastructural facilities (e.g. restrooms, power supply, emergency generator, merchandisers, visitor benches), were fully rebuilt. The reopening as Parkbühne Wuhlheide occurred in June 1996 with a concert of the Brandenburg Philharmonic of Potsdam.

Early in 2003, the open-air stage was renamed the Kindl-Bühne Wuhlheide (after the brewery Berliner Kindl). The stage was sold to the present operator Parkbühne Wuhlheide GmbH by the State of Berlin, represented by the Berlin Real Estate Fund, at the end of August 2007.

In March 2008, the Kindl-Bühne Wuhlheide was awarded the Live Entertainment Award for "Location of the Year".

In summer 2008, the Berlin band Die Ärzte appeared for altogether over 100,000 visitors with six sold-out concerts.

In summer 2011, the Kindl-Bühne Wuhlheide was voted "Berlin's Best Concert Location" by Radio Eins listeners and was awarded with the first "Radio Eins Hot Spot".

== Selected concert events since 1998 ==
- Black Sabbath (2014)
- Beatsteaks (2011, 2008, 2007)
- Bruce Springsteen (1999)
- Bryan Adams (1999)
- Coldplay (2005)
- Deep Purple (2003, 1999)
- Die Ärzte (2012, 2008, 2004, 2001, 1998)
- Die Toten Hosen (2009, 2002, 1999)
- Eric Clapton (2006)
- Eros Ramazzotti (1998)
- Faith No More (2009)
- Farin Urlaub Racing Team (2009)
- Foo Fighters (2008, 2011)
- Green Day (2012, 2022)
- Herbert Grönemeyer (2003)
- Ich + Ich (2010)
- Jack Johnson (2008)
- Joe Cocker (1998)
- Karat (2008, 2007, 2005, 2000)
- Metallica (2003)
- Moderat (2022)
- Ostrock in Klassik (2007,2008,2009)
- Paul Kalkbrenner (2011)
- Pearl Jam (2018, 2014, 2010, 2009, 2006, 2000, 1992)
- Peter Maffay (2005, 2002, 2001, 2000)
- Peter Fox (2009, 2024)
- Pixies (2004)
- Puhdys (2007)
- Pur (2007, 1999)
- R.E.M. (1999)
- Radiohead (2001, 2008, 2012)
- Rammstein (1998, 2005, 2010, 2013)
- Red Hot Chili Peppers (2006, 2003)
- Robbie Williams (2003)
- Roger Waters (2006)
- Rosenstolz (2007, 2006, 2004, 2003)
- Santana (2000)
- Seeed (2007, 2004, 2013)
- Sunrise Avenue (2012, 2013)
- System of a Down (2011, 2013, 2017)
- The Cure (2005, 2026)
- Volbeat (2013)
- Weezer (2022)
- Wir sind Helden (2007, 2005)
- Whitney Houston (1998)
- Xavier Naidoo (2003)
- Unheilig (2011, 2012, 2016)

== See also ==
- List of contemporary amphitheatres
