= Treskow Bridge =

Bridge across the Havel River in Germany

Treskow Bridge Treskowbrücke
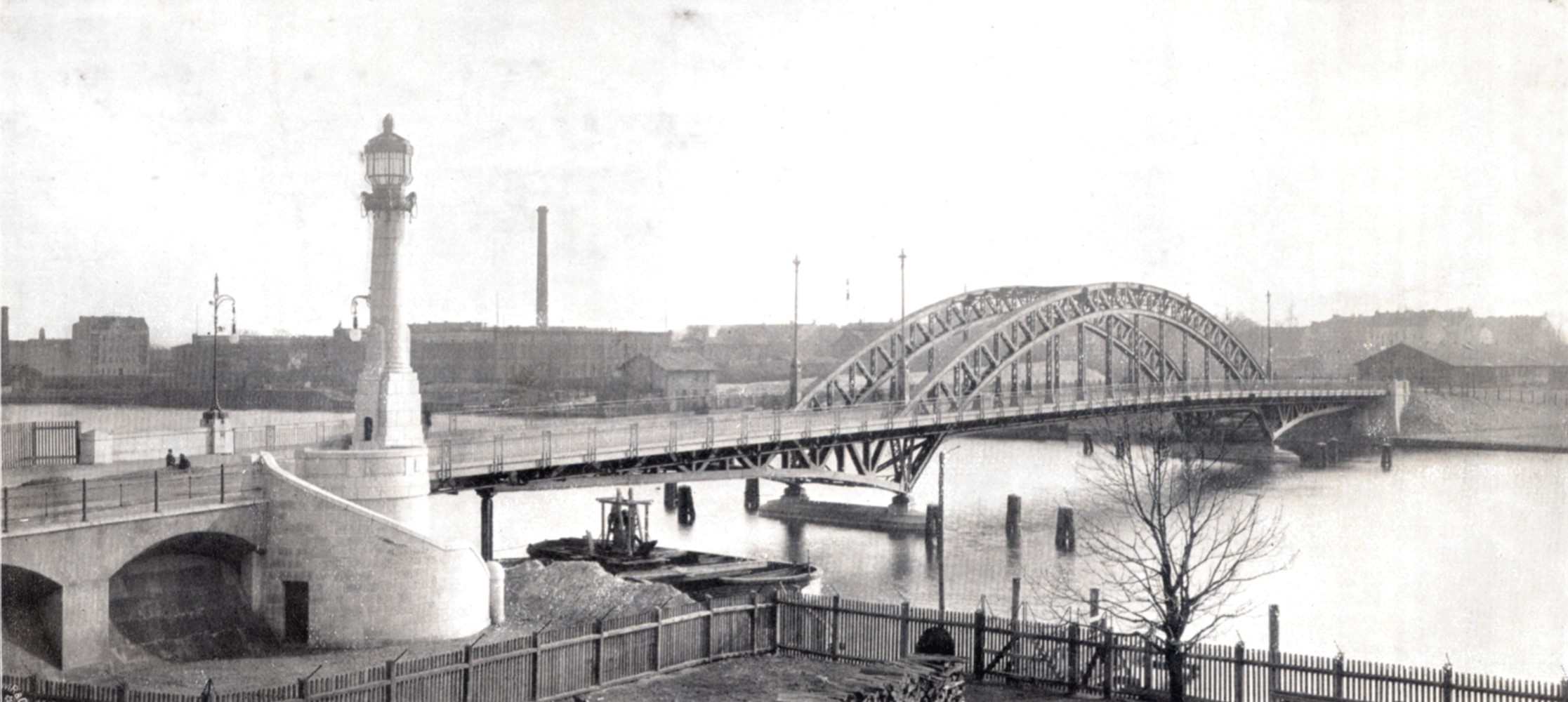
- Treskow Bridge in 1905
- Coordinates: 52°27′36″N 13°30′47″E
- Carries: Edisonstraße
- Crosses: Spree River
- Begins: Oberschöneweide
- Ends: Niederschöneweide
- Named for: Sigismund von Treskow

History
- Opened: 1904, 1934, 1954

Location
- Interactive map of Treskow Bridge

The Treskow Bridge (German: Treskowbrücke) is a bridge across the Spree river in Berlin, Germany, connecting the Oberschöneweide and Niederschöneweide districts of Berlin's Treptow-Köpenick borough. It is named after Sigismund von Treskow, an aristocrat and politician from the Treskow family. The bridge was first completed in 1904, although major reconstruction was necessary in 1954 after it was damaged during World War II.

== History ==
The original structure was constructed after plans by Karl Bernhard, a German architect and engineer, and it was opened in 1904. The elaborate design included a steel arch and monumental features like a lighthouse and grand stairways. It was named upon inauguration and became increasingly frequented due to the surrounding area's rapid development. It was widened in 1934 to accommodate the larger numbers of vehicles passing over the river Spree, resulting in the loss of some of the architectural elements of the first design. In World War II, Wehrmacht troops destroyed the structure to hinder the Red Army from entering Berlin. While creating a lasting obstacle for river traffic in the following years, the destruction of the bridge did not keep the Soviet forces from capturing the city. A wooden pedestrian bridge was erected in 1945 to allow crossings over the river by foot.

During the time of the GDR, the sections of the bridge that were left in the Spree river were removed and reused for the reconstruction of the Treskow Bridge. The repaired bridge was opened in 1954.

The bridge was thoroughly renovated in 1981 and between 1999 and 2001.

== Tram usage ==
Since its inauguration in 1904, Treskow Bridge has been used by trams, being one of the most important river crossings in eastern Berlin. Today, it is frequented by seven lines of the Berlin tram network (21, 27, 37, 60, 61, 67, M17).
