= Oliver Igel =

German politician

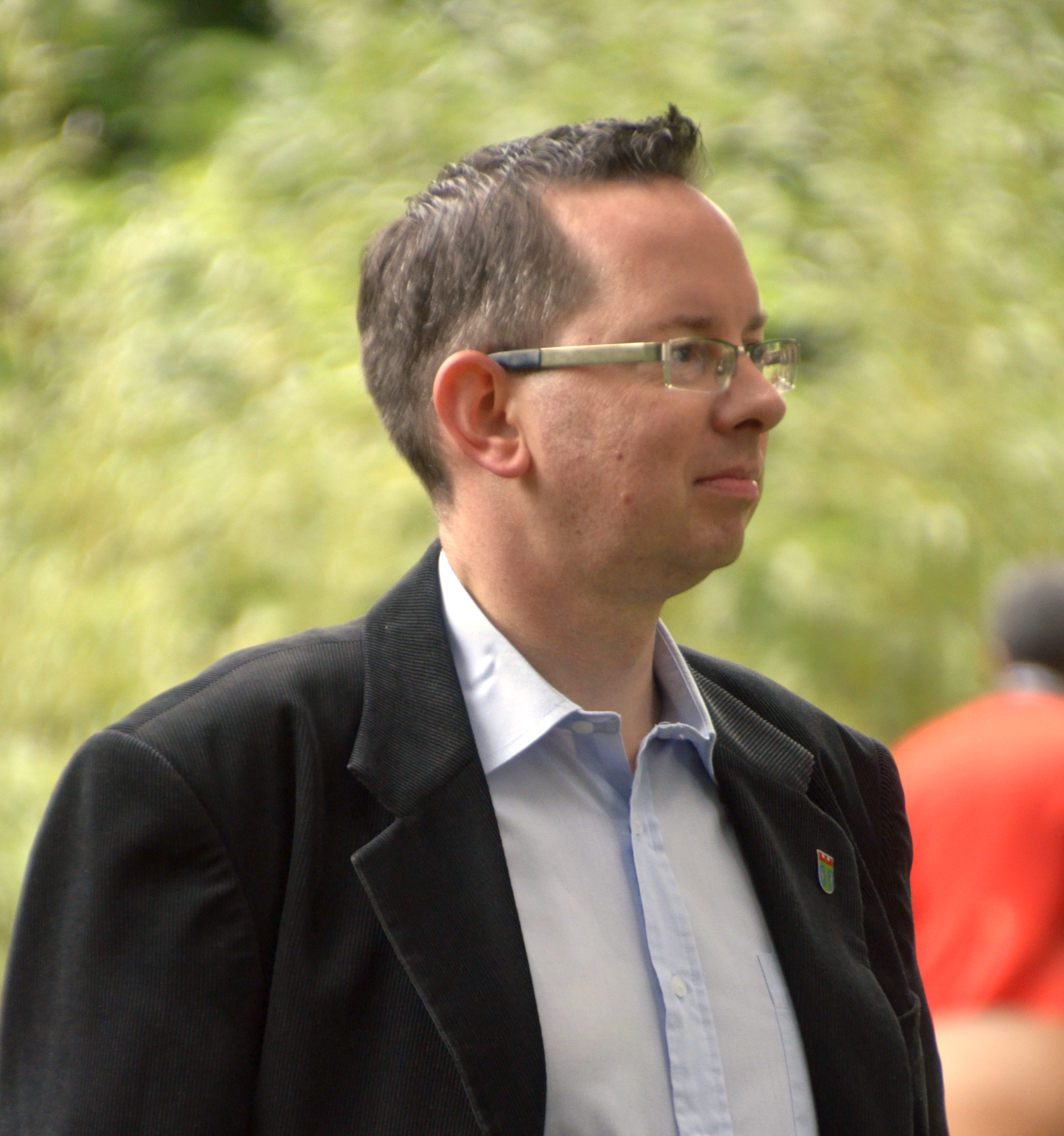
- District Mayor Oliver Igel during the drag hunt in Berlin-Müggelheim

District Mayor (Bezirksbürgermeister) of Treptow-Köpenick
- In office 2011 – -

Personal details
- Born: April 9, 1978
- Party: Social Democratic

Oliver Igel (born 9 April 1978) is a German politician for the SPD and since 2011 'Bezirksbürgermeister' (district mayor) of the Berlin borough of Treptow-Köpenick.

== Life and politics ==
Igel was born 1978 in the eastern part of Berlin and studied politics and similar stuff at the Free University of Berlin.

Igel (German word for "hedgehog") entered the left-wing SPD in 1998 and became the youngest Bezirksbürgermeister of Berlin in 2011, in the borough of Treptow-Köpenick.
