= Niederschöneweide =

- Quarter of Berlin
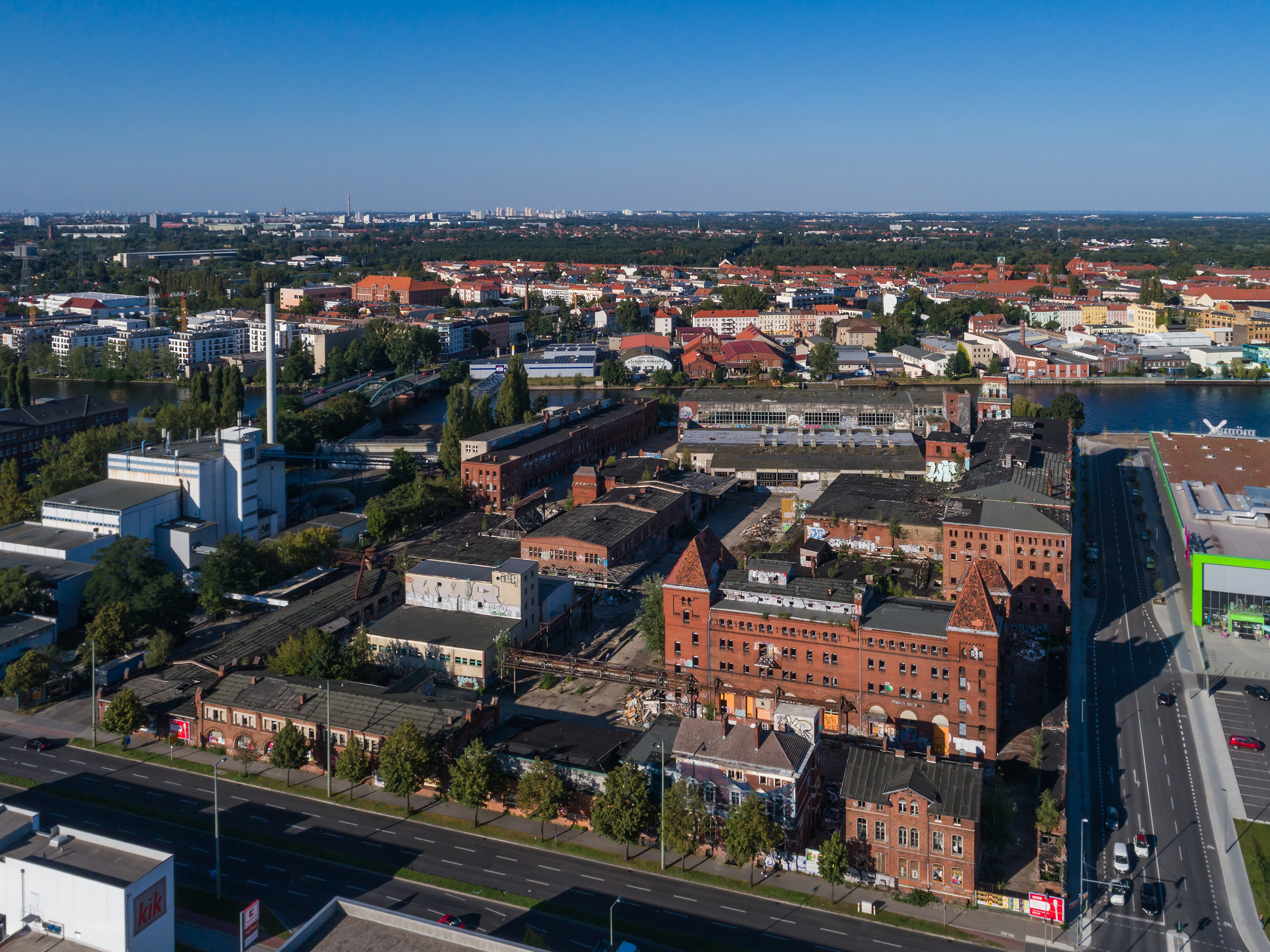
- View of the Bärenquell Brewery in Niederschöneweide

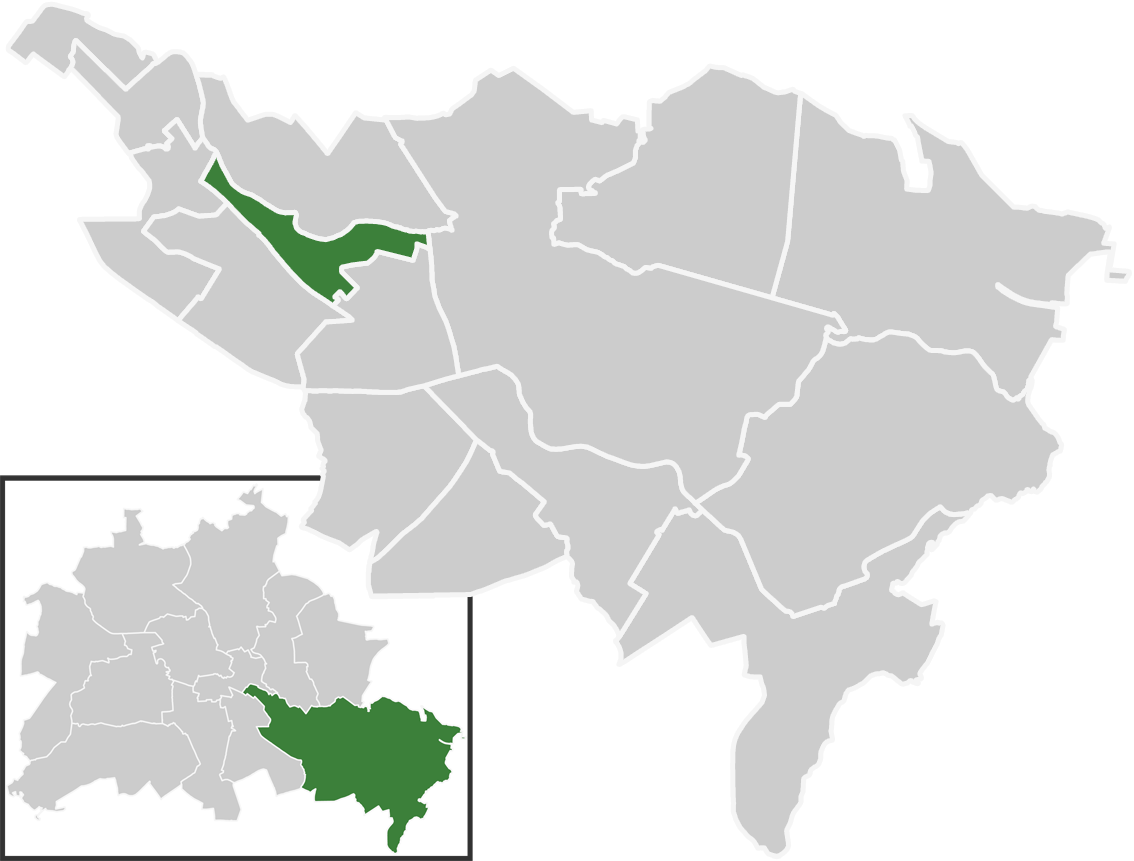
- Location of Niederschöneweide in Treptow-Köpenick and Berlin
- Interactive map of Niederschöneweide
- Location within Germany Location within Berlin
- Coordinates: 52°27′22″N 13°30′47″E
- Country: Germany
- State: Berlin
- City: Berlin
- Borough: Treptow-Köpenick
- Founded: 1598
- Subdivisions: 1 zone

Area
  - Total: 3.49 km^{2} (1.35 sq mi)
- Elevation: 34 m (112 ft)

Population (2024-12-31)
  - Total: 14,508
  - Density: 4,160/km^{2} (10,800/sq mi)
- Time zone: UTC+01:00 (CET)
  - Summer (DST): UTC+02:00 (CEST)
- Postal codes: 12439
- Vehicle registration: B
- Website: Official website

Niederschöneweide (German pronunciation: [ˈniːdərˈʃøːnəˈvaɪ̯də], literally Lower Schöneweide) is a German locality (Ortsteil) within the Berlin borough (Bezirk) of Treptow-Köpenick. It is, with Oberschöneweide (Upper Schöneweide), part of the geographic quarter of Schöneweide. Until 2001 it was part of the former borough of Treptow.

== History ==
First mentioned in 1598 as Schöne Weyde, it became an autonomous municipality in 1850, growing as an industrial town at the end of 19th century. In 1920 it merged into Berlin with the "Greater Berlin Act".

From 1938, the local battery factory used Jews as forced labourers, and later also French prisoners of war and Soviet civilians, and in 1944–1945 it housed a subcamp of the Sachsenhausen concentration camp for 500 mostly Polish and Belgian women.

Between 1949 and 1990 it was part of East Berlin, and new residential complexes were established at Oberspree. All the industries on the territory were converted into Volkseigener Betrieb (VEB), the state-owned enterprises. In 1994, after German reunification, it started a plan for a redevelopment of many contaminated grounds on many areas, inheritance of the heavy industrial era. They must be cleared away and detoxified with high costs.

== Geography ==
=== Overview ===
Located in the south-eastern side of the city and crossed by the river Spree, Niederschöneweide borders with the localities of Oberschöneweide, Plänterwald, Baumschulenweg, Johannisthal, Adlershof and Köpenick. A bit of the urban parks Köllnische Heide, situated in Adlershof, belongs to the quarter.

=== Subdivision ===
Niederschöneweide counts 1 zone (Ortslage):

- Oberspree

== Transport ==
As urban railways, Niederschöneweide is served both by S-Bahn and tramway lines. The railway stations serving the locality are Schöneweide (S45, S46, S47, S8, S85 and S9 lines+DB regional service), Johannisthal (S45, S46, S8, S85, S9) and Oberspree (S47). The tramway lines, crossing Brückenstraße and Michael-Brückner Straße, are the M17, 21, 27, 63 and 67.

== Photos ==
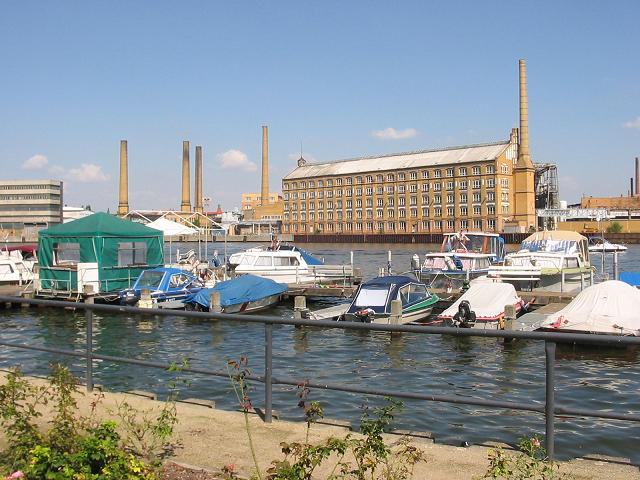
Industrial building over the Spree

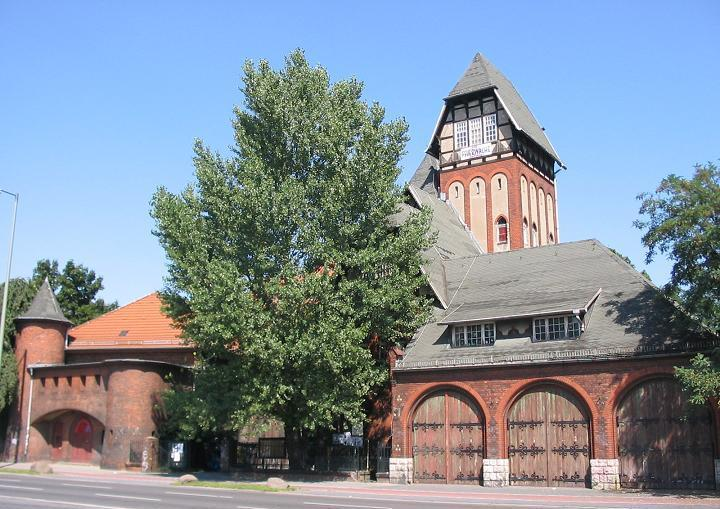
Old fire station

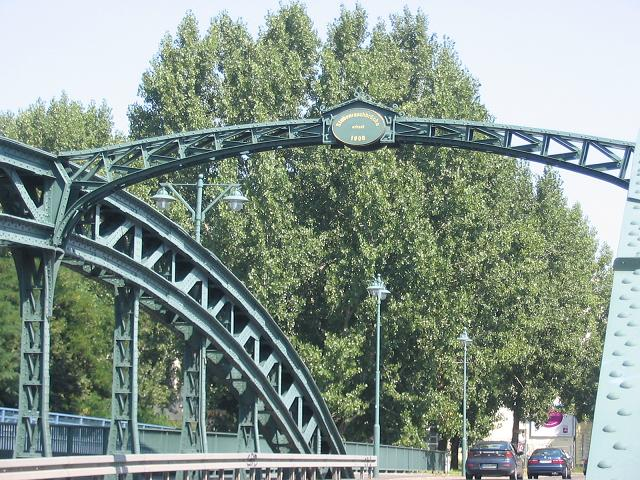
Stubenrauch bridge to Oberschöneweide

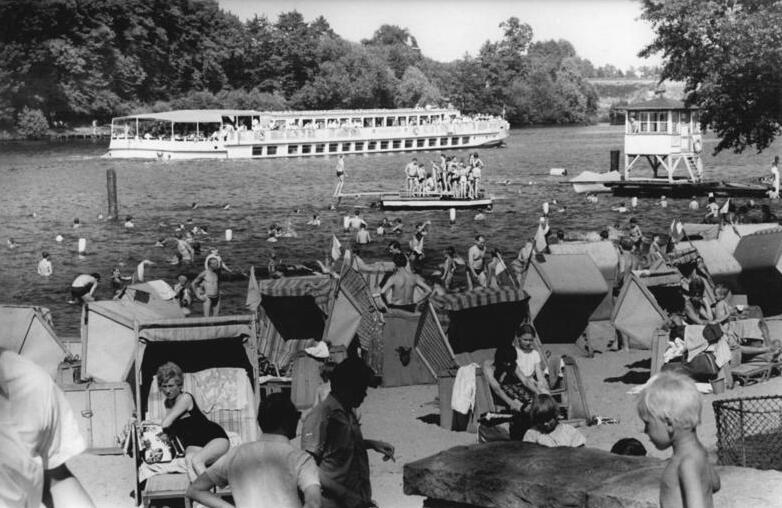
The Oberspree beach in 1970

== Personalities ==
- Ernst Schneller (1890–1944)
