= Oberschöneweide =

- Quarter of Berlin
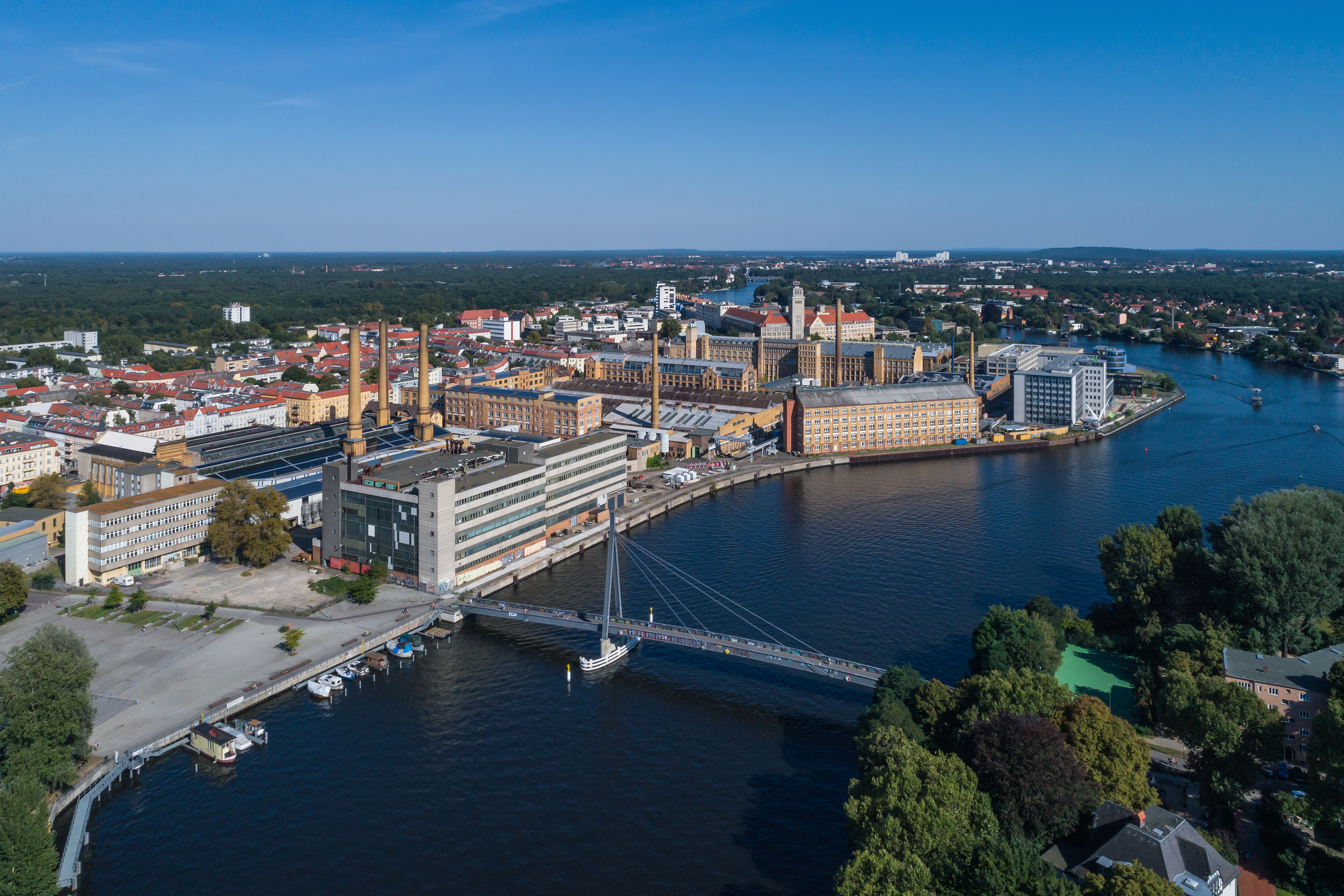
- Industrial buildings over the Spree river

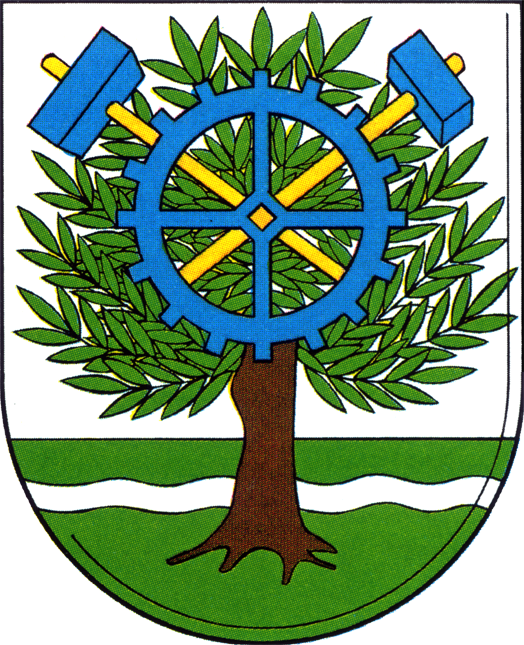
- Coat of arms

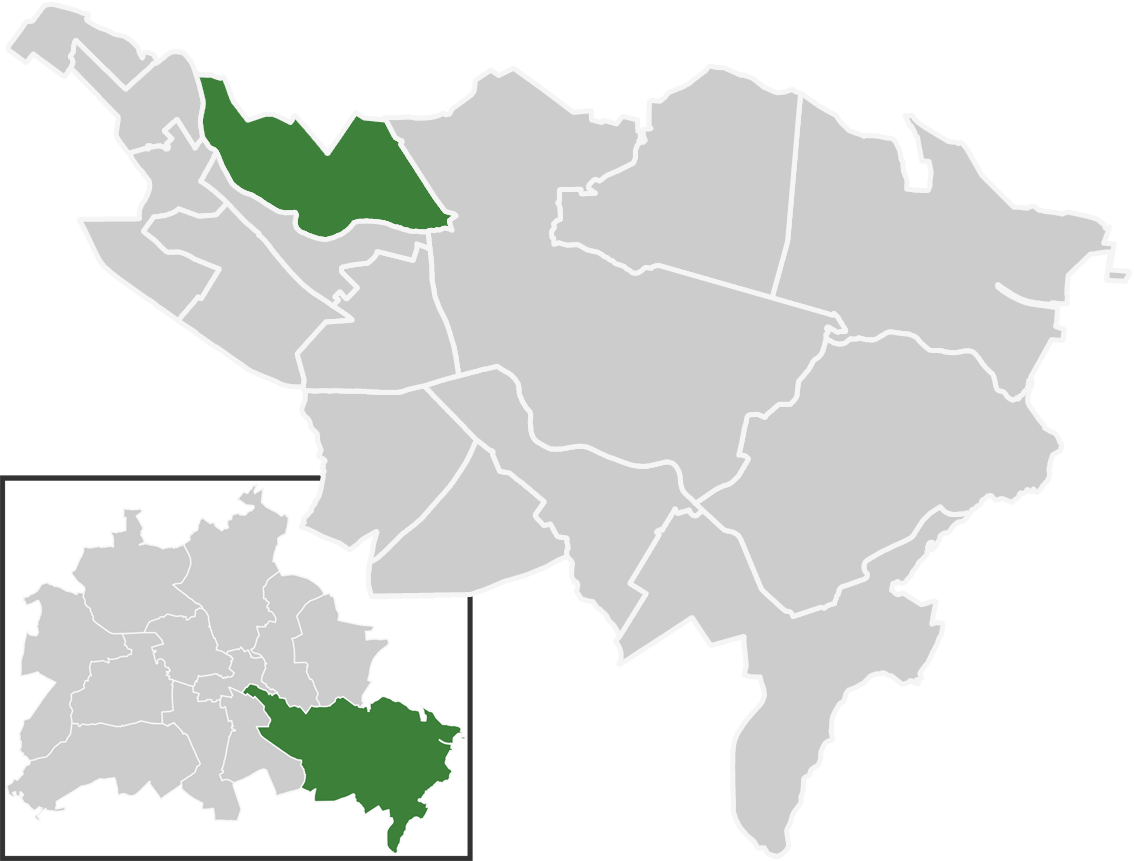
- Location of Oberschöneweide in Treptow-Köpenick and Berlin
- Interactive map of Oberschöneweide
- Location within Germany Location within Berlin
- Coordinates: 52°27′43″N 13°30′54″E
- Country: Germany
- State: Berlin
- City: Berlin
- Borough: Treptow-Köpenick
- Founded: 1598

Area
  - Total: 6.18 km^{2} (2.39 sq mi)
- Elevation: 34 m (112 ft)

Population (2024-12-31)
  - Total: 25,664
  - Density: 4,150/km^{2} (10,800/sq mi)
- Time zone: UTC+01:00 (CET)
  - Summer (DST): UTC+02:00 (CEST)
- Postal codes: 12459
- Vehicle registration: B

Oberschöneweide (German pronunciation: [ˈoːbərˈʃøːnəˈvaɪ̯də], literally Upper Schöneweide) is a German locality (Ortsteil) within the Berlin borough (Bezirk) of Treptow-Köpenick. It is, with Niederschöneweide (Lower Schöneweide), part of the geographic area of Schöneweide. Until 2001 it was part of the former borough of Köpenick.

== History ==
First mentioned in 1598 as Schöne Weyde, it became an industrial town at the end of the 19th century. In 1920 it merged into Berlin as a result of the Greater Berlin Act.

The Berlin territorial reform, in effect from 1 April 1938, also affected the districts of Treptow and Köpenick. The districts of Oberschöneweide and Wuhlheide were removed from the Treptow district and incorporated into the Köpenick district.

In the Nazi era, Oberschöneweide developed into a stronghold of resistance against National Socialism, which despite constant arrests and death sentences could not be broken. The resistance cells were most numerous from 1942-1944. The factories in Oberschoeneweide remained the foundation of the illegal Berlin KPD headquarters.

The mass recalls from 1941 resulted in a lack of staff in the factories. In order to maintain production, more forced laborers from all over Europe were employed. Several barracks camps were built for forced laborers in Wuhlheide. Located here was also the Gestapo subordinate Berlin work education camp of the same name. More than 6,000 foreign forced laborers worked in Kabelwerk Oberspree and other factories located in the AEG factory complex, as well as female inmates at the Sachsenhausen concentration camp from 1944-1945.

In the Allied air raids on 21 June and 6 August 1944, Oberschöneweide endured heavy carpet bombing, while the Kabelwerk Wilhelminenhof was heavily damaged. The attack of 26 February 1945 greeted Oberschöneweide once again in its entirety. Among the casualties were many foreign forced laborers.

On 16 April 1945, during the Battle of Berlin (one of the last battles of World War II in Europe), the retreating German forces tried to stop the Red Army at the Kaisersteg and Treskowbrücke bridges. On April 24 the area fell into the hands of the Soviet 8th Guards Army.

With the administrative division of Greater Berlin by the victorious Allied powers, Oberschöneweide fell with the other districts of the district of Köpenick under Soviet control. As with everywhere else in the Soviet occupation zone, all intact means of production were dismantled and brought to the Soviet administration in Oberschöneweide. This followed the expropriation of the industrial enterprises; they were later converted into state-owned enterprises.

The Queen Elisabeth Hospital served Soviet troops as a military hospital from October 1945 and remained in that capacity until the complete withdrawal of Soviet/Russian troops from Germany in 1994.

In the 1950s, the Nalepastraße radio house was built. Here, all the radio programs of the GDR were produced centrally by the GDR radio service.

Due to changing economic trends since German reunification on 3 October 1990, many companies have suffered layoffs, closures, and privatisations. This was the end of the traditional industrial era. The South Korean industrial giant Samsung operated a production site for tube TVs and mobile devices on the Samsung SDI in Oberschöneweide until the end of 2005. Samsung gave up the location despite the receipt of millions in subsidies by the state of Berlin, due to sales problems and inefficiency. The Oberschöneweides industrial buildings have been historically listed since 1991 and are a focal point of Berlin's industrial heritage. Many small craft enterprises have settled on the industrial estates. Traditional medium-sized companies include Silicon Sensor GmbH (formed by the spin-off of the former television electronics factory) and BAE Batterien GmbH (at the location of Accumulatoren Fabrik Aktiengesellschaft, AFA). In 2006, the former AEG terrain was redeveloped into the HTW Berlin (Hochschule für Technik und Wirtschaft Berlin). As of 2017, there are 18,000 students on the campus.

During rush hours, Spreestraße, Edisonstraße, and Siemensstraße were often congested. As a result, the surrounding residential areas were in turn affected, which led to the inclusion of the entire area in Berlin's noise reduction planning. To relieve the congestion, two more bridges have been planned. The Minna Todenhagen Bridge is part of the southeastern connection, to be completed in the first phase. It leads east to the Britzer canal over the Spree and connects the Rummelsberg Road, over the Minna Todenhagen Road with the Köpenicker country road and fast road in the Niederschöneweide area. On February 27, 2012, the plan approval was issued; construction began in 2013. The construction period was expected to be three years. On 21 December 2017, the road was opened to traffic. The other bridge, Wilhelminenhofbrücke, whose construction project is still in planning, is to lead to the eastern extension of Wilheminenhofstraße over the Spree to Schnellerstraße in the Oberspree.

== Geography ==
Located in the south-eastern side of the city and crossed by the river Spree, Oberschöneweide borders the localities of Plänterwald, Baumschulenweg, Niederschöneweide, Köpenick, Karlshorst and Rummelsburg (both in Lichtenberg district). Its urban park is the Wuhlheide, site of the miniature railway Berliner Parkeisenbahn (BPE) , used during the East German period by the Young Pioneer Organisation.

== Education ==
The Hochschule für Technik und Wirtschaft (HTW - translated as University of Applied Sciences for Engineering and Economics), the youngest and largest University of Applied Sciences in Berlin, is located on the Campus Wilhelminenhof located in Oberschöneweide. In addition, the German Ministry of Education has 3 urban day care centres in this town, and ten schools that include two primary schools, one integrated secondary school (integrated programme) and seven other secondary schools.

Other institutions in the community are similar to the SkillsFuture for their training structures, and are also parts of the institute of adult learning. Many of the students are attached to various companies in the area which offer internships (industrial attachment programme):

- Technologie- und Gründerzentrum Spreeknie (TGS)
- E. Michaelis & Co. KG
- First Sensor AG, previously Silicon Sensor GmbH
- BAE Batterien GmbH
- iris-GmbH
- Berliner WasserSportZentrale GbR
- Sportstudio Orange-Fit (Golightly Energy GmbH)

== Transport ==
The locality is served by the S-Bahn line S3, at Wuhlheide station, partly located in Köpenick. Located by the southern shore of the Spree in Niederschöneweide, it is the main station in Schöneweide. The locality is also served by the tramway lines M17, 21, 27, 37, 63, and 67. At Wilhelmstrand, by the river, there is a short ferry service (line F11) that links it to Baumschulenstraße, in Baumschulenweg.

The locality is bordered by the Rummelsburger highway running between Treskowallee and Rudolf-Rühl-Allee, which runs along the eastern edge of town and meets the An der Wuhlheide street.

There were plans for the U5 to be extended from Friedrichsfelde via Karlshorst to Oberschöneweide in the 1950s, however this was not realized with the extension to Hönow in the late 1980s. In 2017, the bus service 365 was introduced from Oberschöneweide to Baumschulenweg.

== Photogallery ==
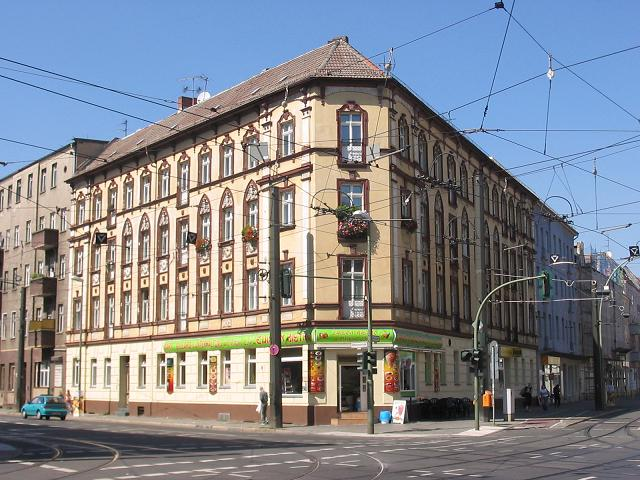
The centre of the quarter

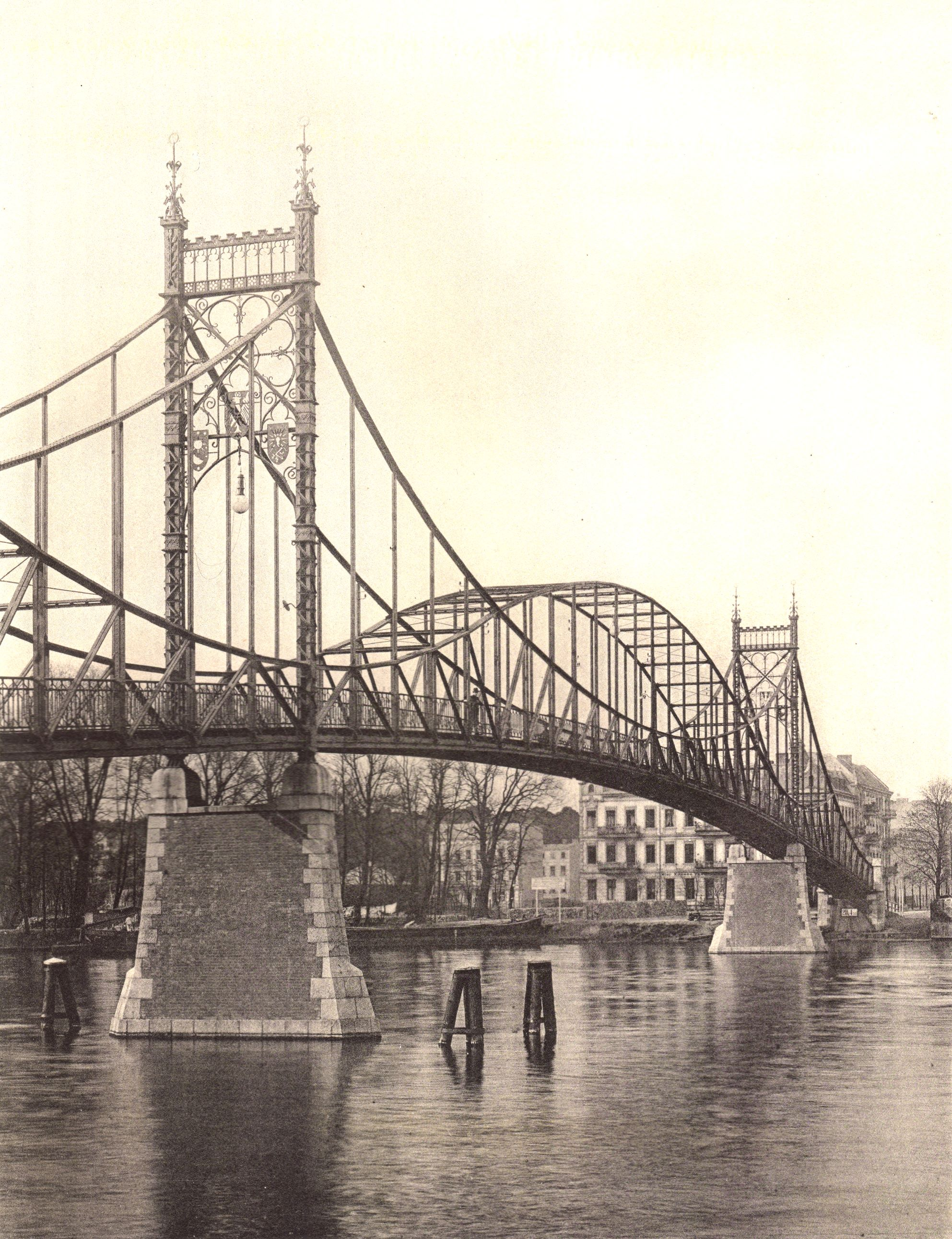
The old Kaisersteg in 1900

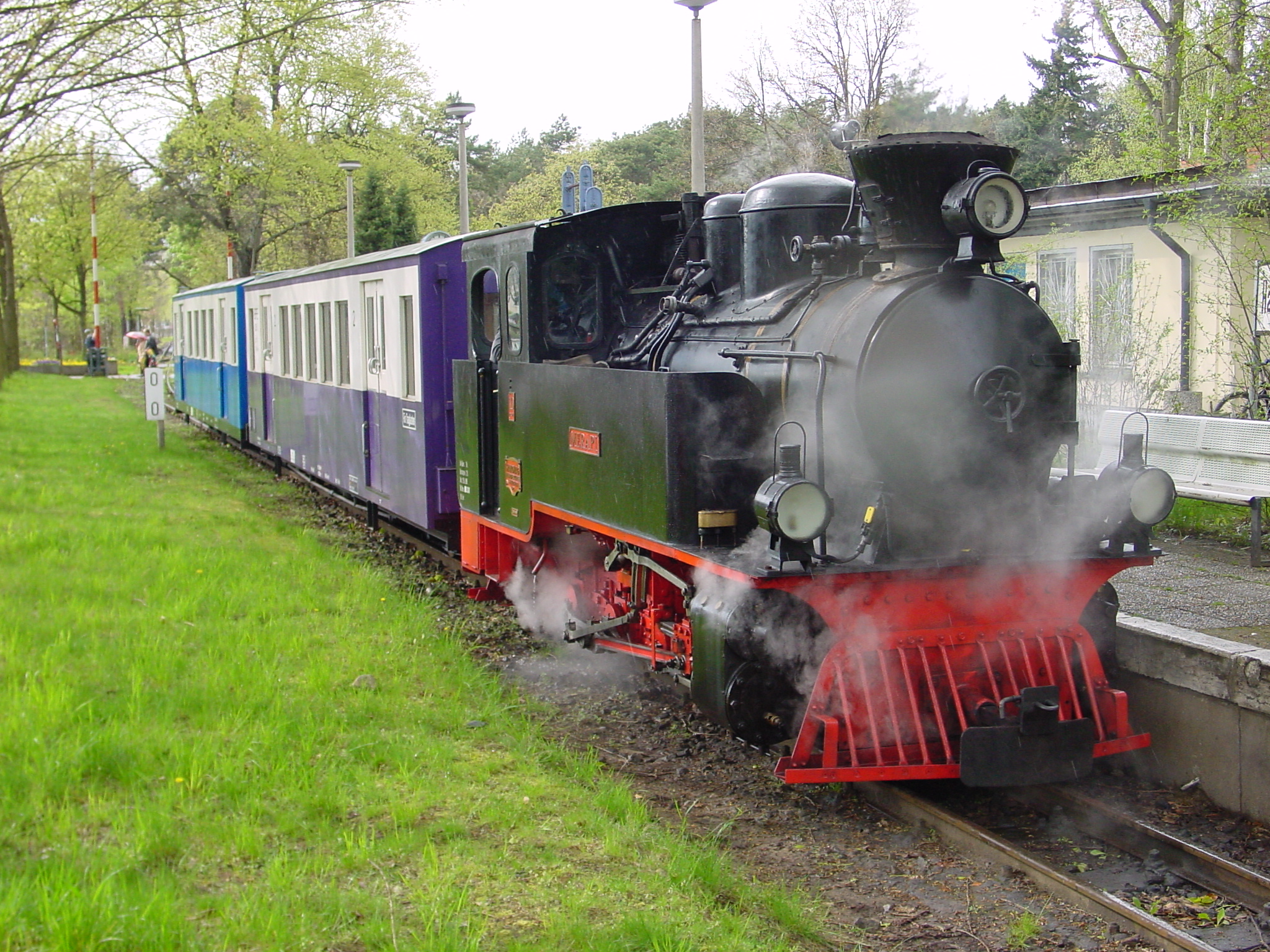
A BPE train in Wuhlheide

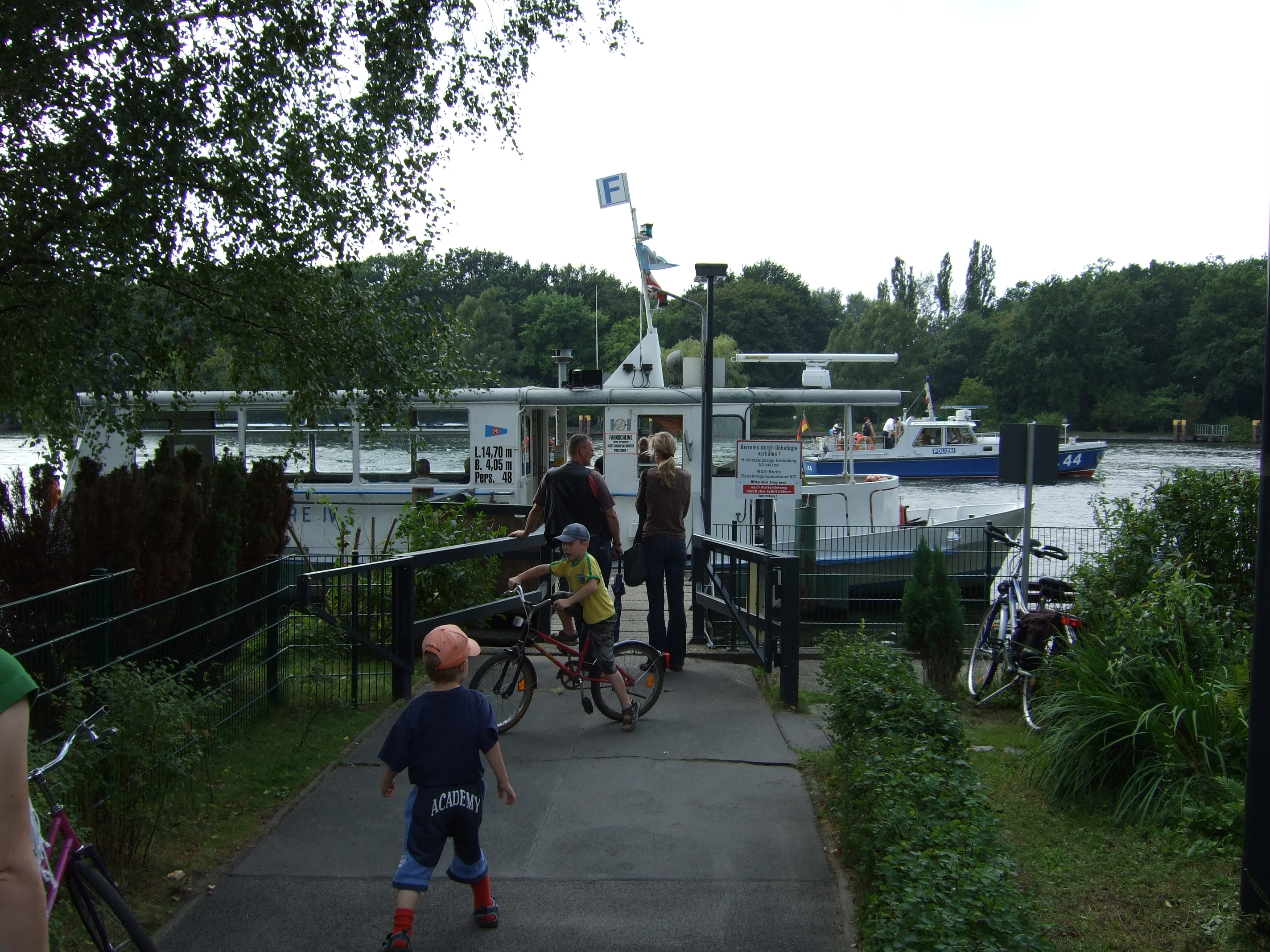
Wilhelmstrand ferry station

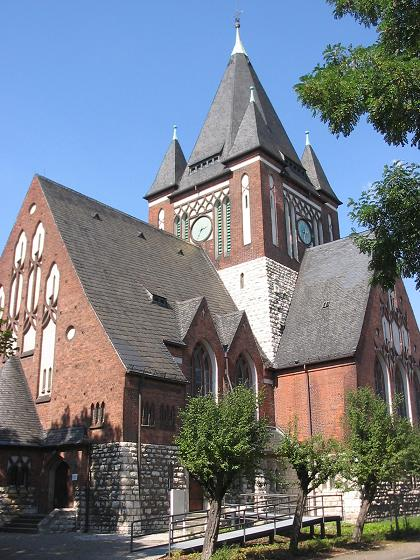
The Christuskirche (Christ Church)

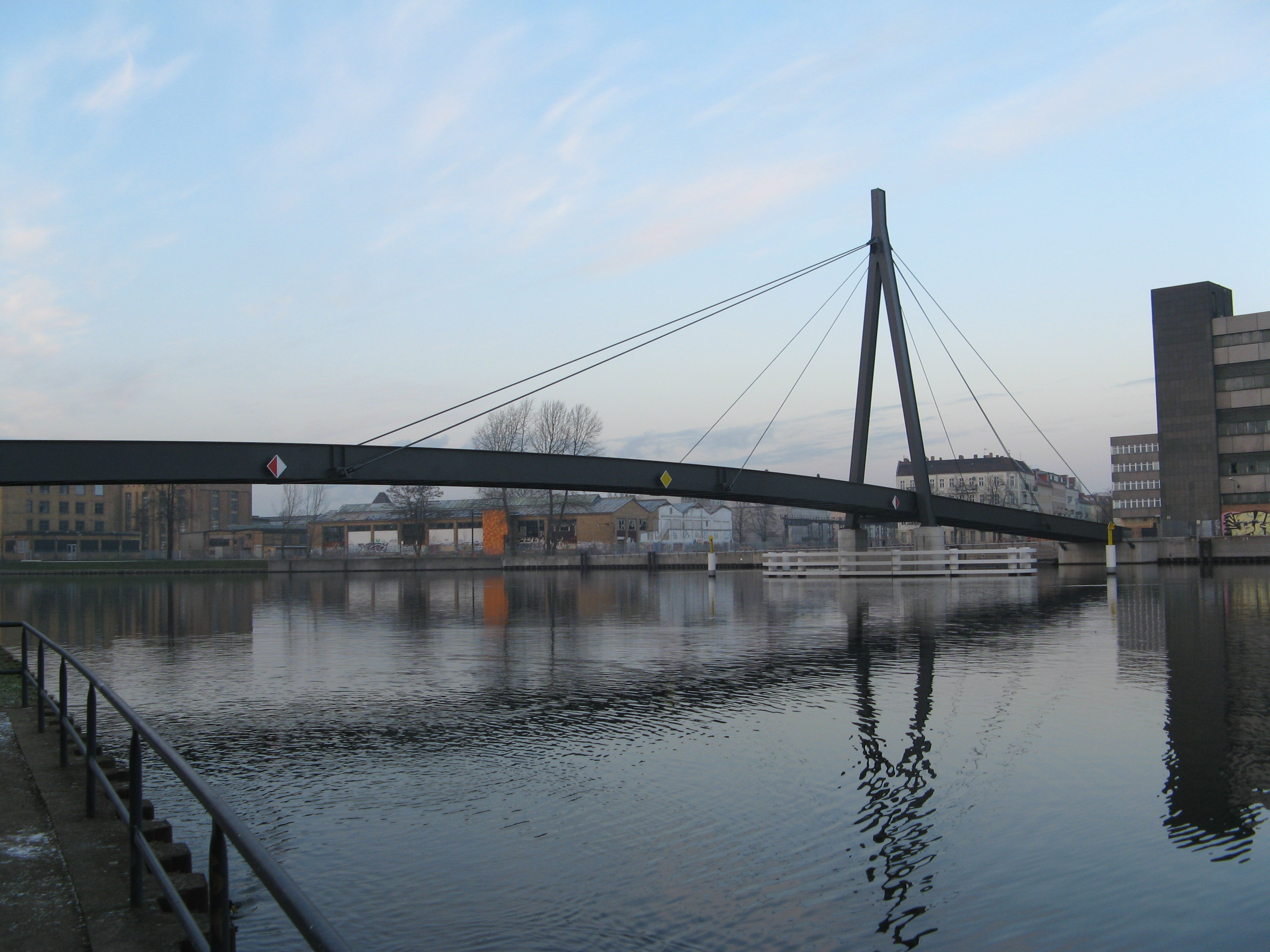
The new Kaisersteg

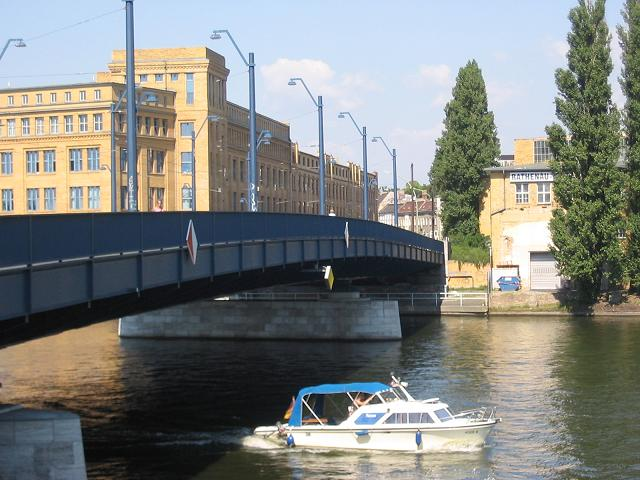
The new Treskow Bridge

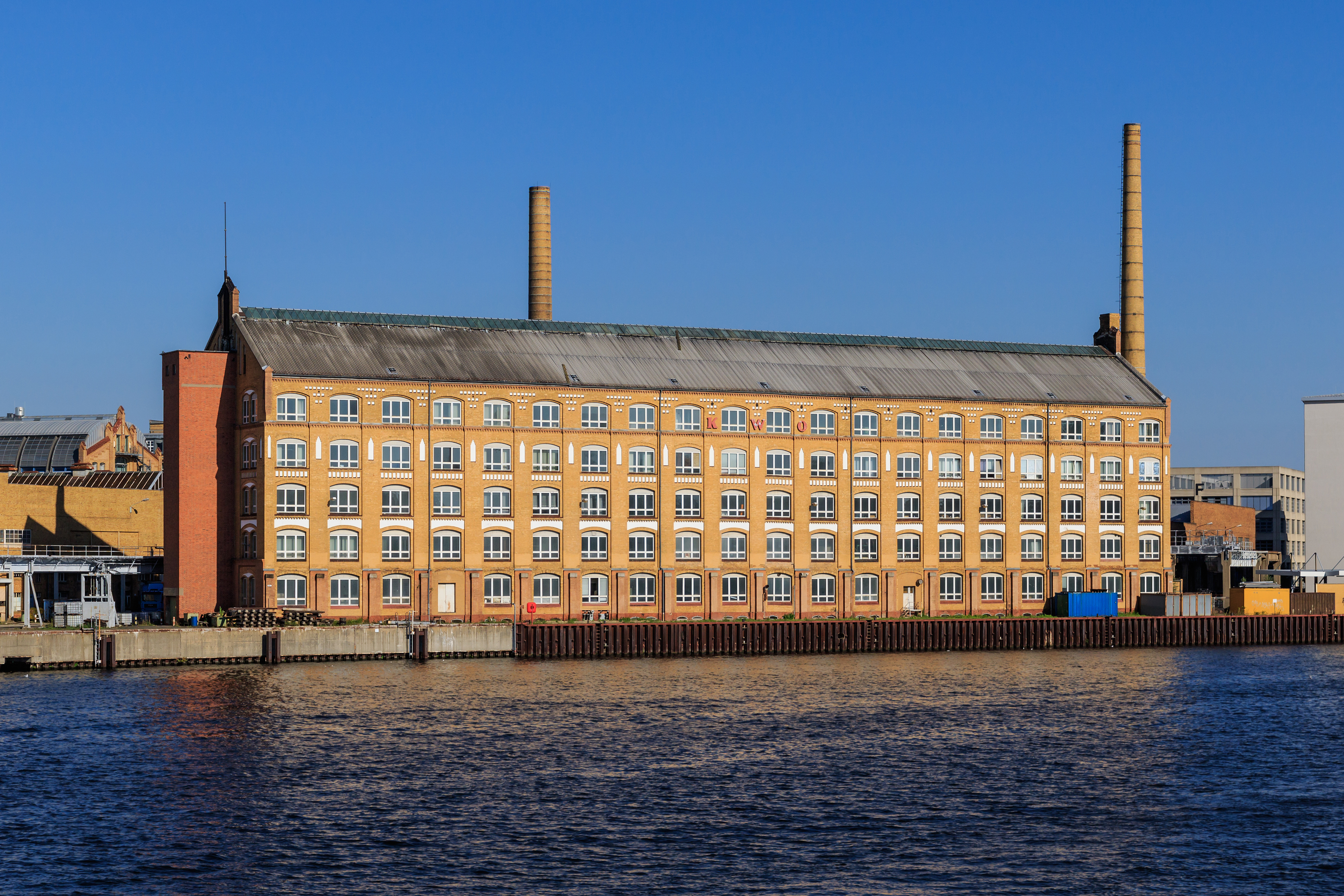
A factory on the Spree

== Personalities ==
- Emil Rathenau (1838–1915)
- Walther Rathenau (1867–1922)

== Literature ==
- Judith Uhlig: "Köpenick – Geschichte der Berliner Verwaltungsbezirke". Stapp Verlag 1997, ISBN 3-87776-077-5
- Hans-Jürgen Rach: "Die Dörfer in Berlin". VEB Verlag für Bauwesen, Berlin 1988 ISBN 3-87776-211-5
