= Treptow-Köpenick =

- Borough of Berlin
- Flag Coat of arms

- Location of Treptow-Köpenick in Berlin
- Interactive map of Treptow-Köpenick
- Location within Germany Location within Berlin
- Coordinates: 52°27′N 13°34′E
- Country: Germany
- State: Berlin
- City: Berlin
- Subdivisions: 15 localities

Government
  - Mayor: Oliver Igel (SPD)

Area
  - Total: 168.43 km^{2} (65.03 sq mi)

Population (2024-12-31)
  - Total: 288,802
  - Density: 1,714.7/km^{2} (4,441.0/sq mi)
- Time zone: UTC+01:00 (CET)
  - Summer (DST): UTC+02:00 (CEST)
- Vehicle registration: B
- Website: Official website

Treptow-Köpenick (German pronunciation: [ˈtʁeːpto ˈkøːpənɪk]) is the ninth borough of Berlin, Germany, formed in Berlin's 2001 administrative reform by merging the former boroughs of Treptow and Köpenick.

The borough was formerly part of East Berlin.

== Overview ==
Among Berlin's boroughs it is the largest by area with the lowest population density. The Johannisthal Air Field, Germany's first airfield, was located in Treptow-Köpenick, between Johannisthal and Adlershof. Treptower Park, a popular place for recreation and a tourist destination, is also located in the borough. The park features the sprawling Soviet War Memorial, a war memorial to the Soviet soldiers who fell in the Battle of Berlin in 1945.

== Subdivisions ==
Subdivisions of Treptow-Köpenick

Treptow-Köpenick is divided into 15 localities:

- Alt-Treptow
- Plänterwald
- Baumschulenweg
- Johannisthal
- Niederschöneweide
- Altglienicke
- Adlershof
- Bohnsdorf
- Oberschöneweide
- Köpenick
- Friedrichshagen
- Rahnsdorf
- Grünau
- Müggelheim
- Schmöckwitz

== Politics ==
=== District council ===
The governing body of Treptow-Köpenick is the district council (Bezirksverordnetenversammlung). It has responsibility for passing laws and electing the city government, including the mayor. The most recent district council election was held on 26 September 2021, and the results were as follows:

Party	Lead candidate	Votes	%	+/-	Seats	+/-
Social Democratic Party (SPD)	Oliver Igel	40,300	25.2	▲0.4	16	▲1
The Left (LINKE)	Ines Feierabend	28,213	17.7	▼5.0	11	▼3
Alliance 90/The Greens (Grüne)	Claudia Leistner	21,929	13.7	▲4.3	8	▲3
Christian Democratic Union (CDU)	Bertram Wieczorek	21,131	13.2	▲0.7	8	▲1
Alternative for Germany (AfD)	Alexander Bertram	19,031	11.9	▼8.2	7	▼5
Free Democratic Party (FDP)	Joachim Schmidt	9,698	6.1	▲2.5	3	▲1
Tierschutzpartei	Jennifer Schrodt	5,934	3.7	New	2	New
Die PARTEI		3,935	2.5	▼0.2	0	±0
Free Voters		2,878	1.8	New	0	New
dieBasis		2,533	1.6	New	0	New
Treptow-Köpenick Voters' Association		1,080	0.7	New	0	New
Klimaliste		998	0.6	New	0	New
The Humanists		630	0.4	New	0	New
National Democratic Party		530	0.3	▼0.8	0	±0
Liberal Conservative Reformers		514	0.3	New	0	New
Ecological Democratic Party		431	0.3	New	0	New
Valid votes		159,765	99.0			
Invalid votes		1,627	1.0			
Total		161,392	100.0		55	±0
Electorate/voter turnout		219,255	73.6	▲7.4		
Source: Elections Berlin

=== District government ===
The district mayor (Bezirksbürgermeister) is elected by the Bezirksverordnetenversammlung, and positions in the district government (Bezirksamt) are apportioned based on party strength. Oliver Igel of the SPD was elected mayor on 27 October 2011. Since the 2021 municipal elections, the composition of the district government is as follows:

Councillor	Party	Portfolio
Oliver Igel	SPD	District Mayor; Civil Service, Staff, Finance, Real Estate and Economy
Carolin Weingart	LINKE	Deputy Mayor; Social Affairs, Labour and Participation
Claudia Leistner	GRÜNE	Urban Development, Roads, Green Spaces and Environment
Alexander Freier-Winterwerb	SPD	Youth and Health
Marco Brauchmann	CDU	Education, Culture and Sport
Bernd Geschanowski	AfD	Public Order Affairs
Source: Berlin.de

== Twin towns – sister cities ==
Treptow-Köpenick is twinned with:

- Albinea, Italy (1997)
- Cajamarca, Peru (1998)
- Cologne, Germany (1990)
- East Norriton Township, Pennsylvania, United States (1991)
- Izola, Slovenia (2002)
- Mokotów (Warsaw), Poland (1993)
- Mürzzuschlag, Austria (2002)
- Odernheim, Germany (1997)
- Subotica, Serbia (2002)
- Tepebaşı, Turkey (2017)
- Veszprém County, Hungary (2002)

== See also ==
- Berlin-Treptow-Köpenick (electoral district)
- Stubenrauchbrücke (Treptow-Köpenick district)
