= Alt-Treptow =

- Quarter of Berlin
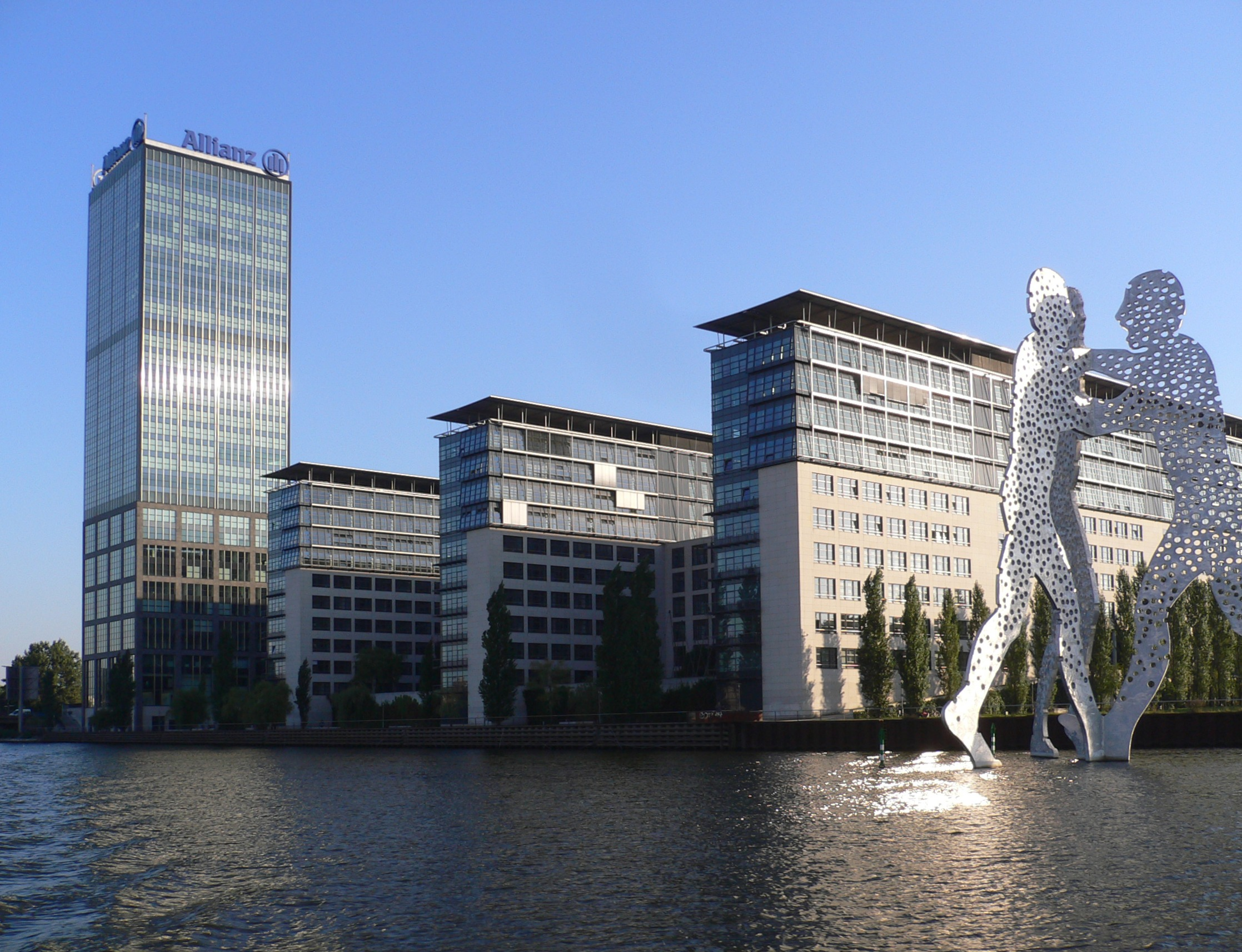
- The building complex "Treptowers" and the sculpture "Molecule Man"

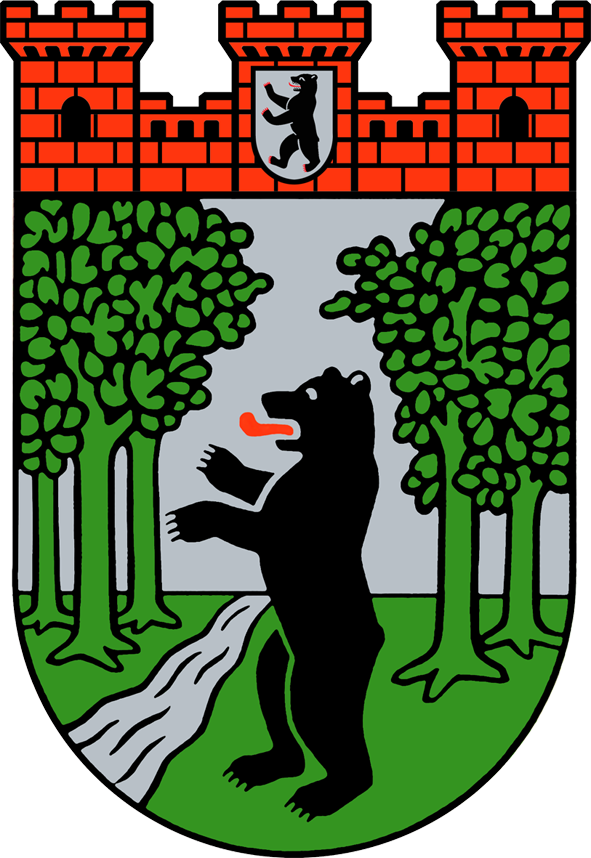
- Coat of arms

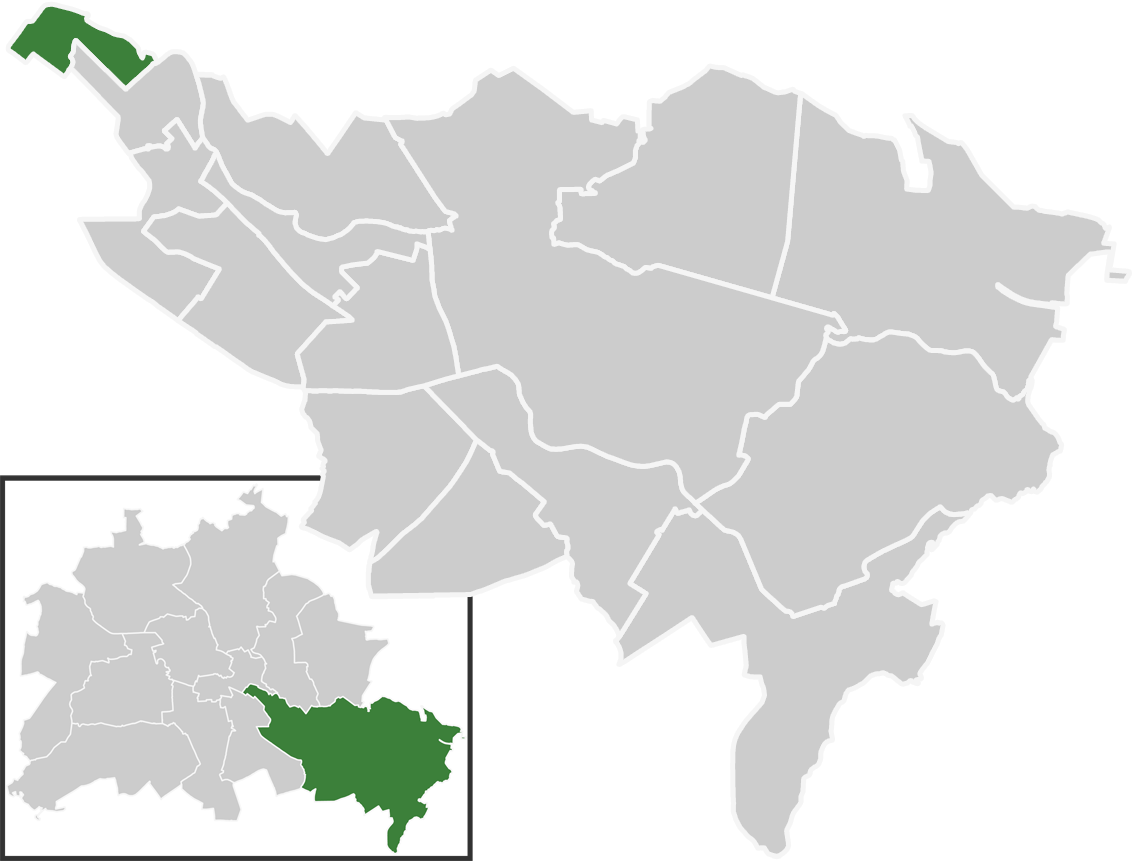
- Location of Alt-Treptow in Treptow-Köpenick and Berlin
- Interactive map of Alt-Treptow
- Location within Germany Location within Berlin
- Coordinates: 52°29′24″N 13°26′58″E
- Country: Germany
- State: Berlin
- City: Berlin
- Borough: Treptow-Köpenick
- Founded: 1568

Area
  - Total: 2.31 km^{2} (0.89 sq mi)
- Elevation: 34 m (112 ft)

Population (2024-12-31)
  - Total: 13,453
  - Density: 5,820/km^{2} (15,100/sq mi)
- Time zone: UTC+01:00 (CET)
  - Summer (DST): UTC+02:00 (CEST)
- Postal codes: 12435
- Vehicle registration: B

Alt-Treptow (German pronunciation: [ˌaltˈtʁeːptoː], lit. 'Old Treptow') is a German locality in the borough of Treptow-Köpenick in Berlin. Known also as Treptow it was, until 2001, the main and the eponymous locality of the former Treptow borough.

== History ==
The locality, first inhabited in 6th century by Slavic peoples, was first mentioned in 1568 with the name of Trebow. It merged into Berlin with the Greater Berlin Act in 1920. From 1961 to 1989 its north and western borders were crossed by the Berlin Wall. From January 1, 2001 the former borough of Treptow, composed also by Plänterwald, Baumschulenweg, Niederschöneweide, Johannisthal, Adlershof, Altglienicke and Bohnsdorf; was disestablished to merge into the new Treptow-Köpenick borough.

== Geography ==
Alt-Treptow is situated in the south-eastern suburb of Berlin and half of its territory is occupied by the Treptower Park. It borders with the localities of Plänterwald, Neukölln (in Neukölln borough), Friedrichshain and Kreuzberg (in Friedrichshain-Kreuzberg borough). Bordered in north by the Spree river it counts in its territory an islet named "Insel der Jugend" (Youth Island).

== Transport ==
The only S-Bahn station in the locality is the Treptower Park station, which sits on the Ringbahn and is served by the lines S4, S8, S85, and S9.

The Autobahn 100 currently ends in the locality at a junction with Am Treptower Park. Plans to continue the road's construction over the Spree towards Ostkreuz have no foreseeable start date.

== See also ==
- Badeschiff
- Molecule Man
- Osthafen
- Soviet War Memorial (Treptower Park)
- Spreepark
- Treptowers
- Treptower Park

== Photogallery ==
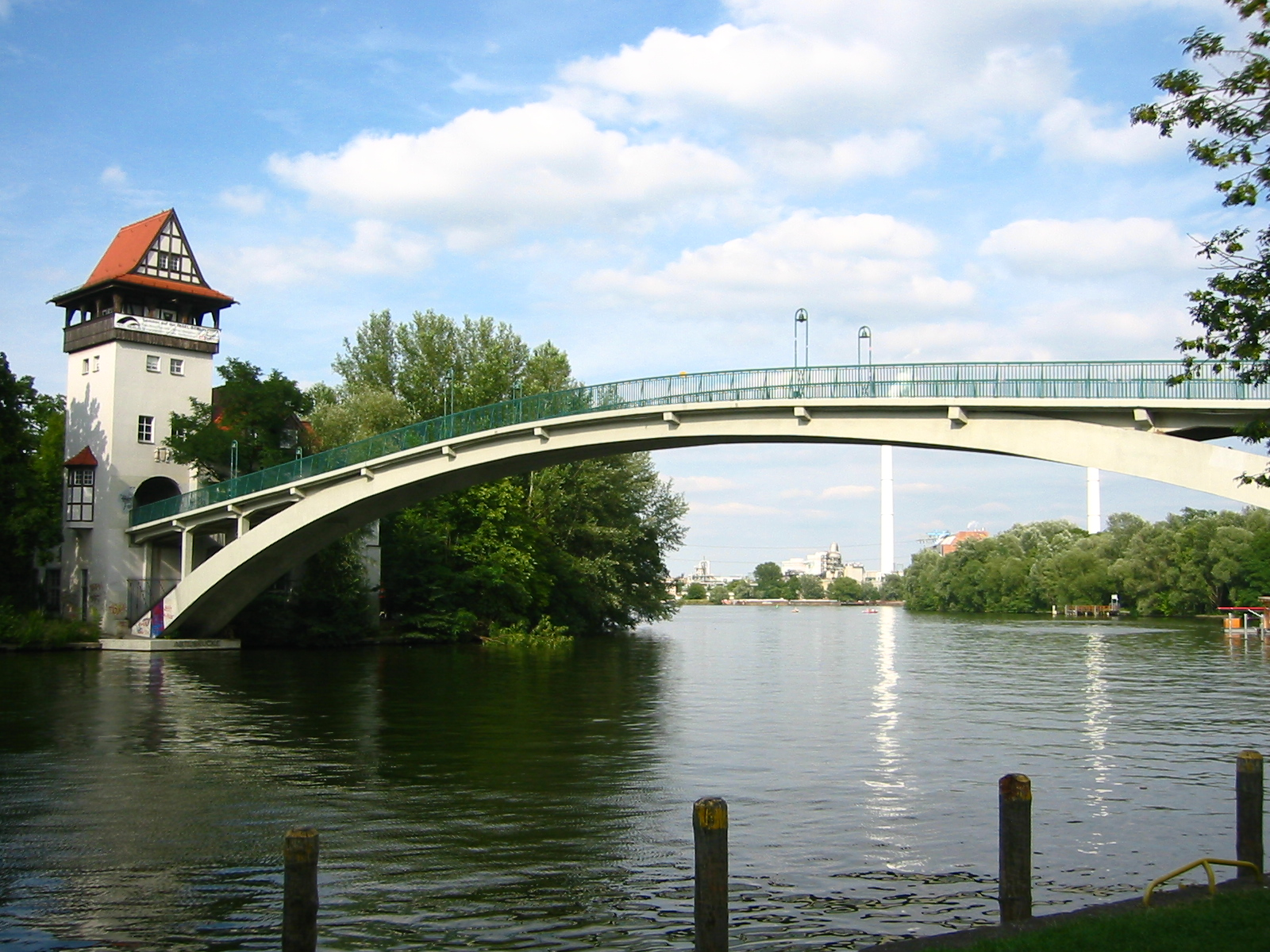
The bridge to the Insel der Jugend in Treptower Park

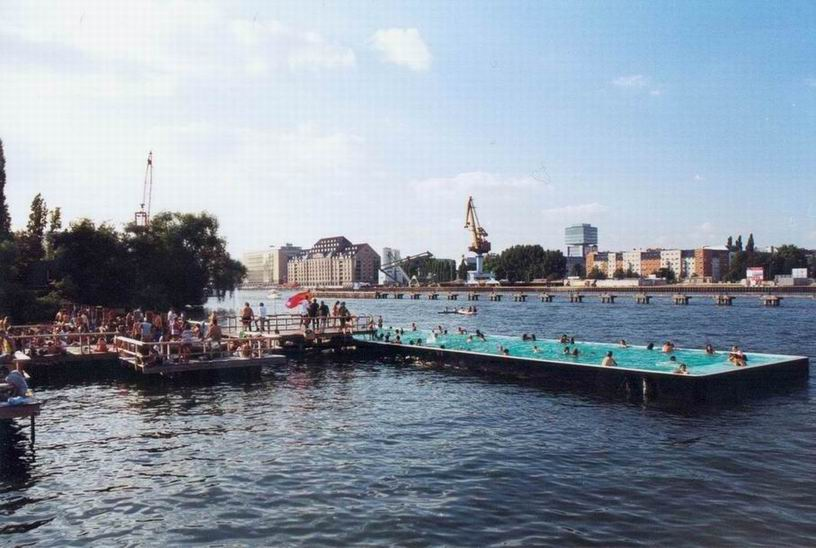
The Badeschiff
