= Casper (rapper) =

German rapper and singer (born 1982)

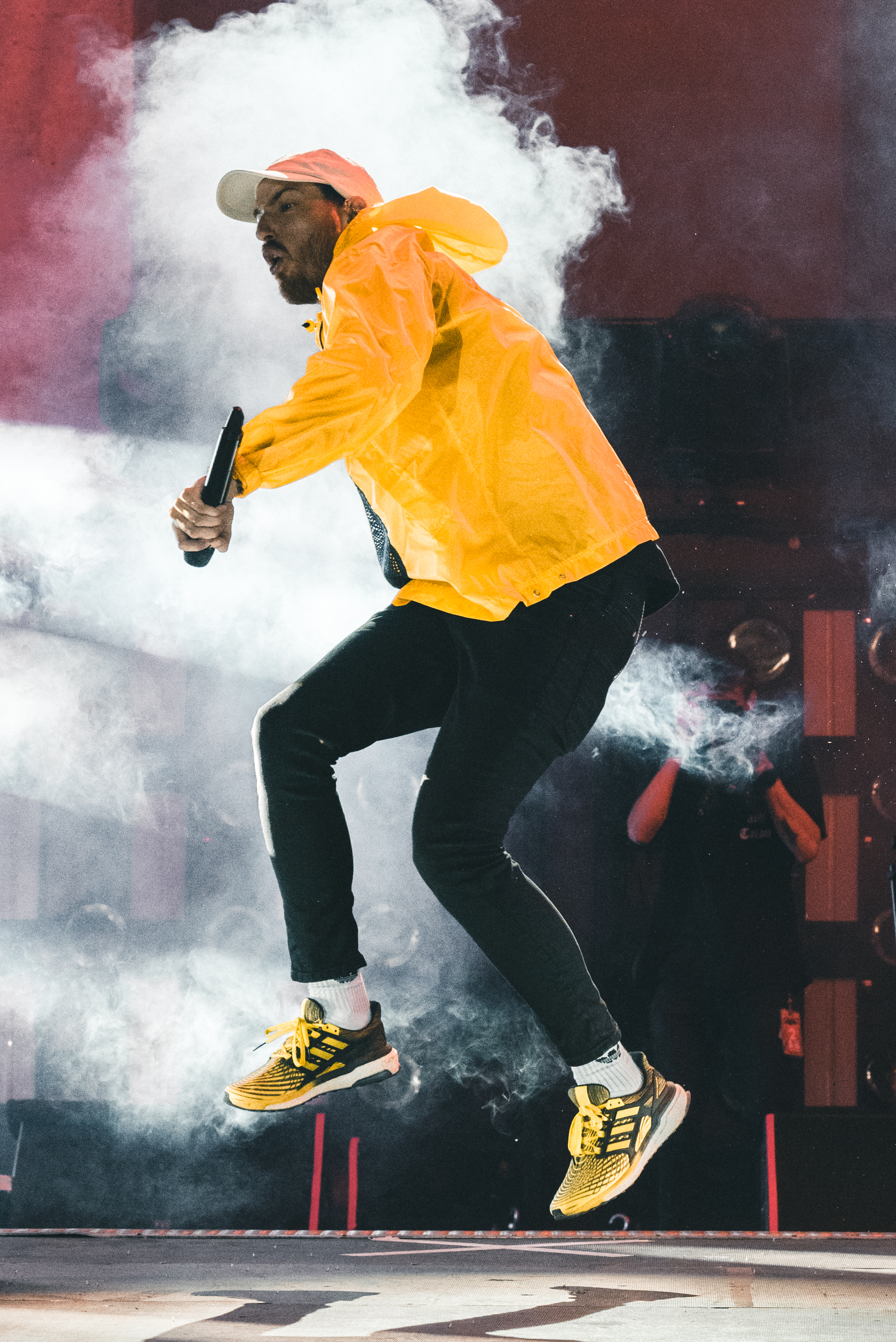
- Casper at the 2018 Splash! festival

Background information
- Born: Benjamin Griffey; 25 September 1982 (age 44); Lemgo, West Germany (now Germany)
- Genres: German hip hop; pop rap; rap rock; emo rap
- Occupations: Rapper; singer
- Years active: 2003–present
- Label: Four Music

Benjamin Griffey (born 25 September 1982), better known by his stage name Casper, is a German rapper and singer with US roots signed to Sony Music.

== Early life ==
Casper was born in Lemgo in North Rhine-Westphalia to a German mother and an American father, Arlen Griffey, who was a soldier stationed in Lemgo. His family moved to Augusta, Georgia, in the United States, when he was two weeks old, where he lived in a trailer park. At the age of 11, he moved back to Germany with his mother and younger sister. Despite his mother being German, he had not been raised bilingually and therefore struggled at school initially. For university studies, he settled in Bielefeld.

== Career ==
Casper was involved in many studio recordings with other German rappers, such as Abroo and Separate. Together they founded the hip-hop group Kinder des Zorns. In 2004, they released Rap Art War, their first and only album.

In 2006, he released a mixtape called Die Welt hört mich with the label 667 – One More Than the Devil. In the two years following the release of Die Welt hört mich, he toured through Germany, and on 9 May 2008, he released his first album, Hin zur Sonne via the 667 record label.

In February 2009, he left 667 Records and signed a contract with Selfmade Records. Together with Kollegah, Favorite and Shiml, who were also signed to Selfmade Records, they released Chronik 2 in April 2009.

In October 2010, Casper left Selfmade Records and signed a new contract with Four Music. His second album, XOXO, was released on 8 July 2011.

Casper is known for his slightly hoarse-sounding voice: this was a result of him having played in punk and hardcore bands in the early days of his music career which resulted in some damage to his vocal cords.

== Reception in the German rap scene ==
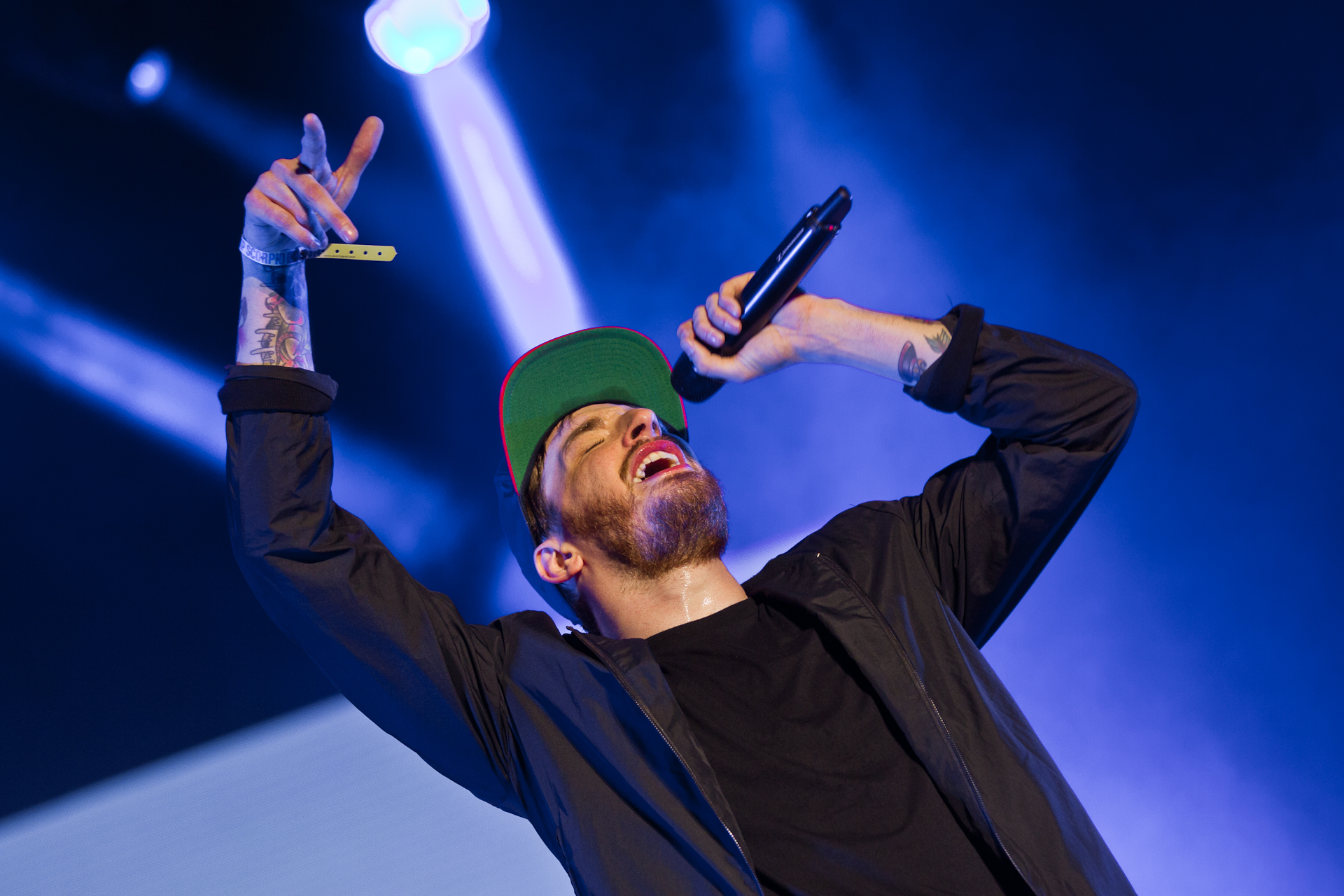
Casper at Southside Festival 2014

Casper has often been labelled as an "emo rapper", which he also uses to describe himself, stating that he was fed up of being asked about his style. His lyrics are mainly autobiographical, in particular in the song Hin zur Sonne, describing his early life in America.

== Discography ==
Albums

- 2008: Hin zur Sonne
- 2011: XOXO
- 2013: Hinterland
- 2017: Lang lebe der Tod
- 2018: 1982 together with Marteria
- 2022: Alles war schön und nichts tat weh
- 2023: Nur Liebe, immer.

Mixtapes

- 2006: Die Welt hört mich
- 2007: Exclusive Mixtape (online mixtape)

EPs

- 2003: Grundstein
- 2011: Auf und davon - EP

Freetracks

- 2006: Kann nicht verlieren
- 2006: Sie lieben mich jetzt
- 2007: Party wie die Rockstars
- 2008: Nie wieder (feat. Prinz Pi)
- 2011: Nie Wieder (Akustik Version) (feat. Prinz Pi)
- 2012: Nie Auf (with Cro feat. Timid Tiger)
- 2012: Halbe Mille

Collaborations

- 2004: Rap Art War (Kinder des Zorns album)
- 2009: Chronik 2 - sampler with Kollegah, Shiml and Favorite
- 2018: 1982 - album with Marteria

Singles

- 2009: Herz aus Holz 2009
- 2009: Mittelfinger hoch feat. Kollegah, Shiml and Favorite
- 2011: So perfekt
- 2011: Michael X
- 2011: Auf und davon
- 2013: Im Ascheregen
- 2013: Hinterland
- 2013: Jambalaya
- 2014: Alles endet (aber nie die Musik)
- 2016: Lang lebe der Tod feat. Blixa Bargeld, Dagobert & Sizarr
- 2017: Keine Angst feat. Drangsal
- 2017: Alles ist erleuchtet
- 2018: Champion Sound with Marteria
- 2018: Supernova with Marteria
- 2018: Chardonnay & Purple Haze with Marteria

== Trivia ==
- Casper is a fan of the football club Arminia Bielefeld. His song Eines Tages is dedicated to Arminia Bielefeld.
- In the 1LIVE Schulduell (School duel), the winning school, Geschwister-Scholl-Gymnasium in Düsseldorf, won an exclusive concert with Casper.
