= Treptow =

Former borough of Berlin

- Borough of Berlin
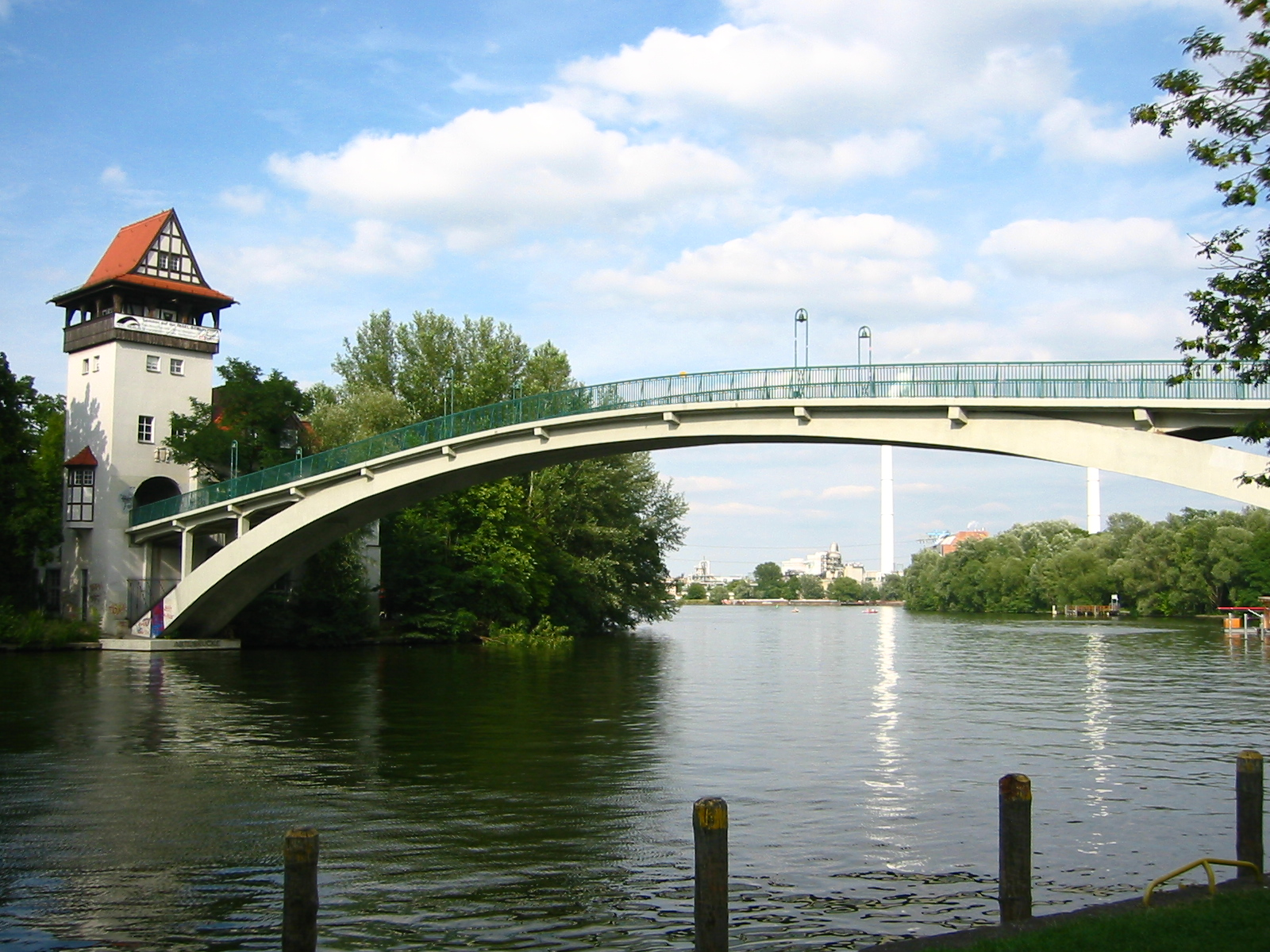

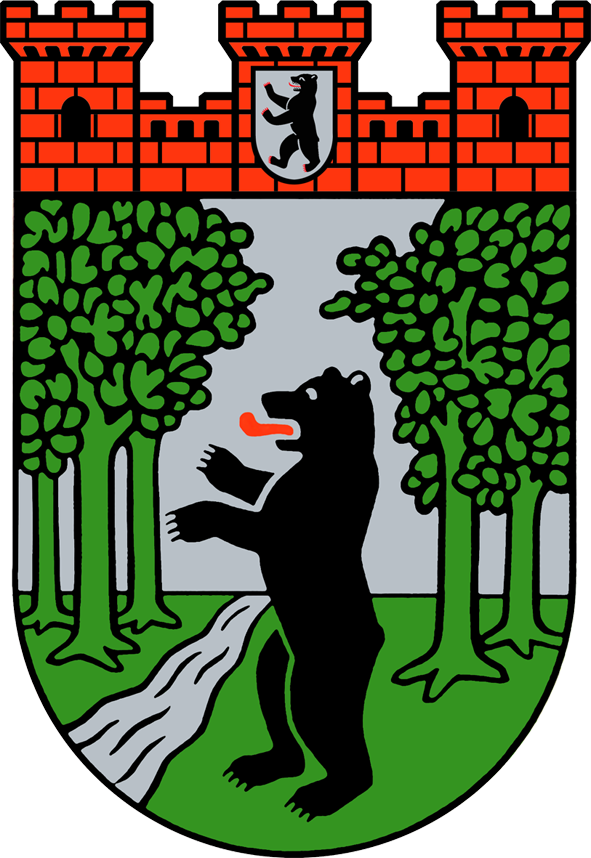
- Coat of arms

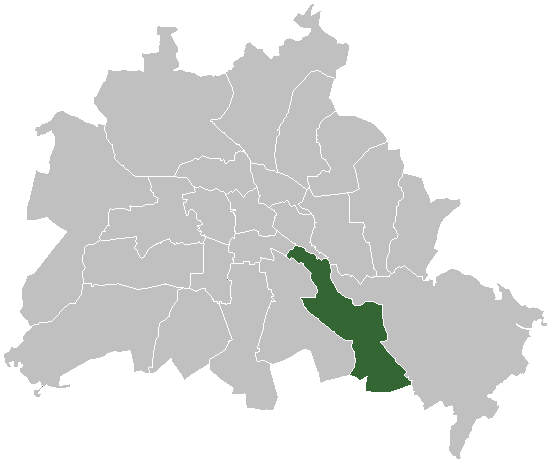
- The location of Treptow in Berlin
- Interactive map of Treptow
- Location within Germany Location within Berlin
- Coordinates: 52°29′03″N 13°28′46″E
- Country: Germany
- State: Berlin
- City: Berlin
- Founded: 1920
- Disbanded: 2001

Government
  - Mayor: Siegfried Stock (SPD)

Area
  - Total: 40.65 km^{2} (15.70 sq mi)

Population (1999)
  - Total: 113,140
  - Density: 2,783/km^{2} (7,209/sq mi)
- Time zone: UTC+01:00 (CET)
  - Summer (DST): UTC+02:00 (CEST)

Treptow (German pronunciation: [ˈtʁeːptoː]) is a locality and former borough in the southeast of Berlin. It merged with Köpenick to form Treptow-Köpenick in 2001.

== Geography ==
The district was composed by the localities of Alt-Treptow, Plänterwald, Baumschulenweg, Niederschöneweide, Johannisthal, Adlershof, Altglienicke and Bohnsdorf.

== Photo gallery ==
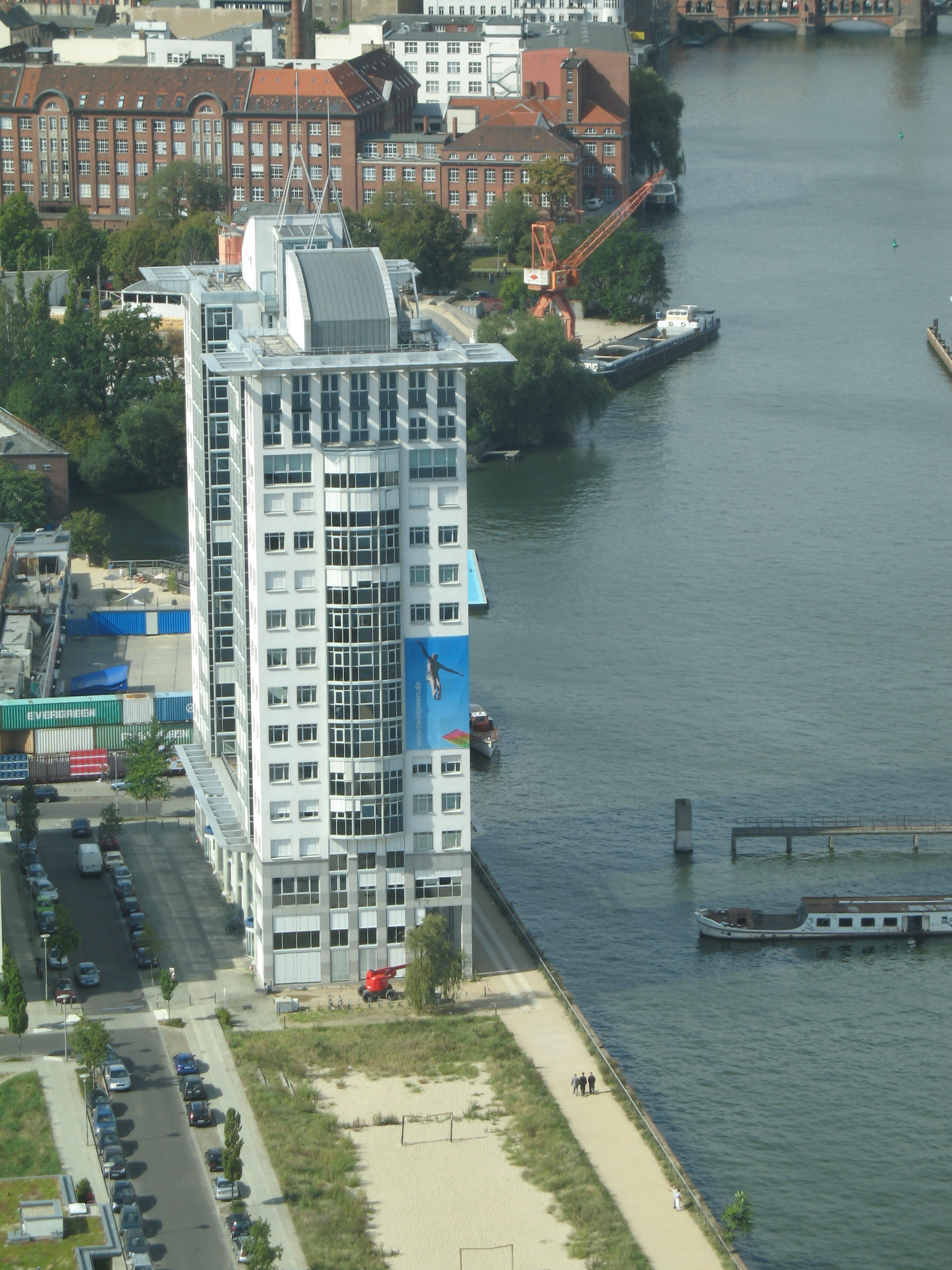
Twin Towers building in Treptow

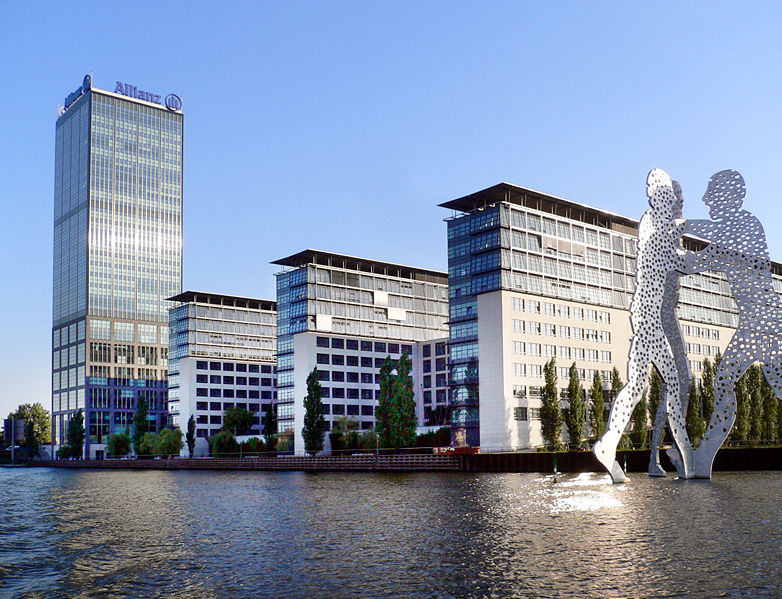
Treptowers compound in Treptow

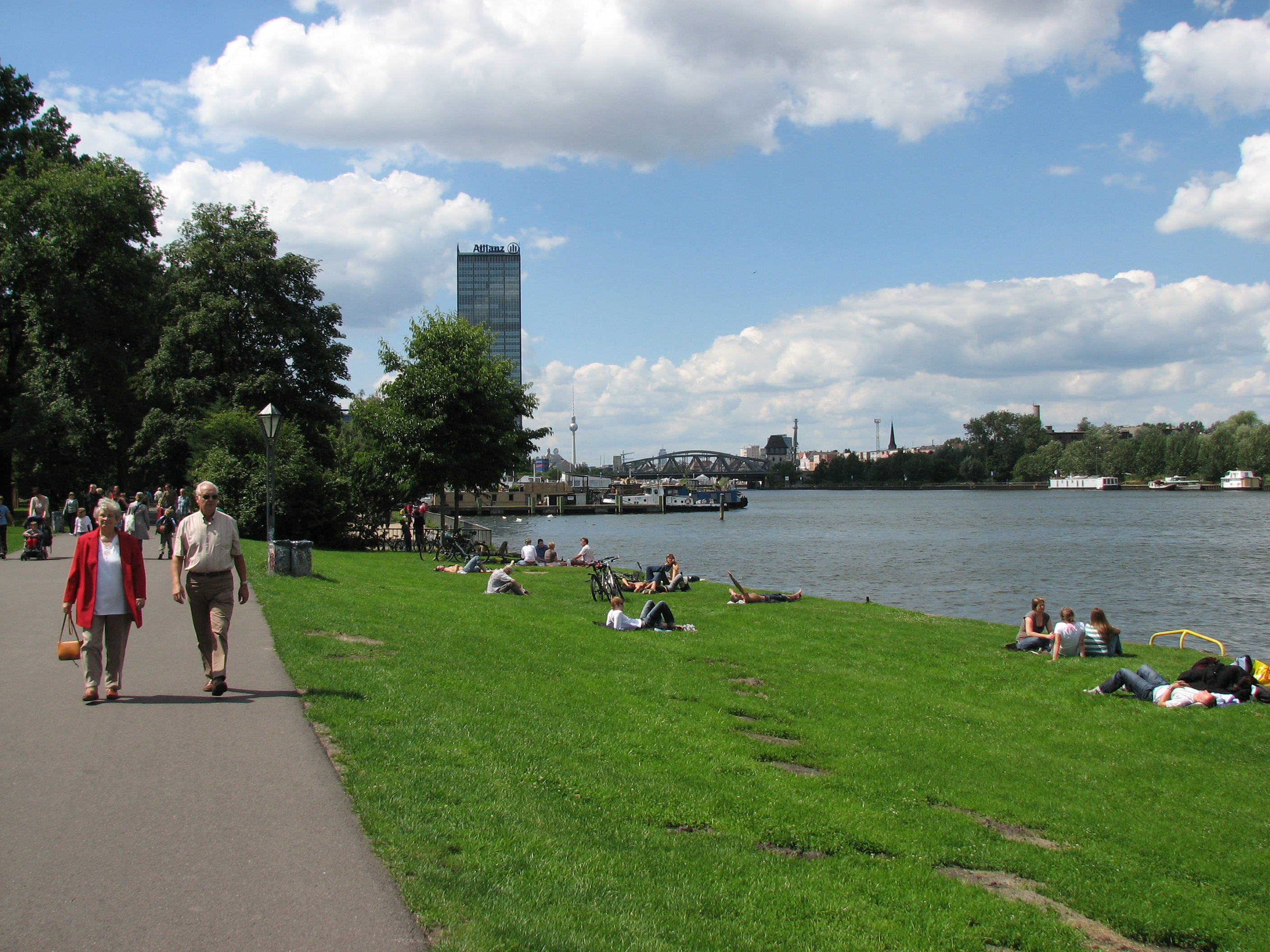
People sunbathing along the Spree River in Treptow

== See also ==
- Alt-Treptow
