= Spreepark =

Former amusement park in Berlin, Germany

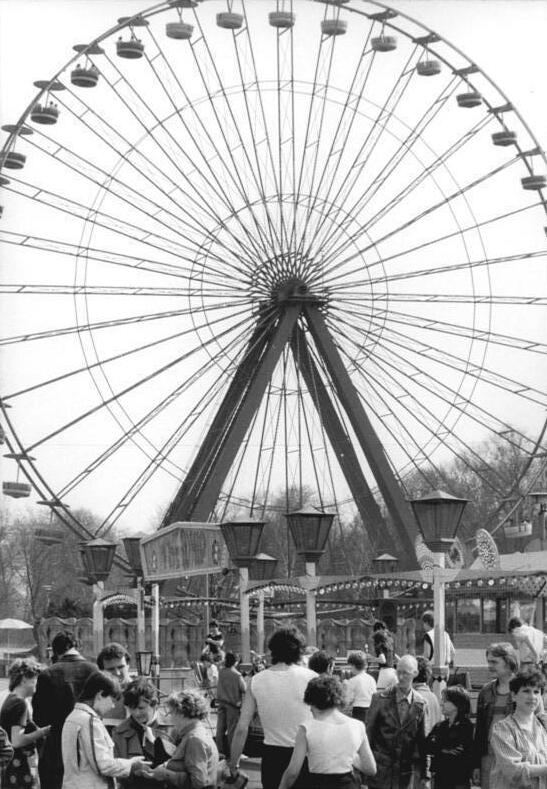
- Spreepark Ferris wheel in 1985
- Interactive map of Spreepark
- Location: Plänterwald, Germany (East Germany 1969-1990), Berlin, Germany
- Coordinates: 52°29′09″N 13°29′16″E
- Status: Defunct
- Opened: 1969
- Closed: 2002
- Website: http://www.spreepark.de/

Spreepark is a former amusement park in the north of the Plänterwald in the Berlin district Treptow-Köpenick (formerly part of the GDR-controlled East Berlin). It was also known by its earlier name Kulturpark Plänterwald Berlin.

== History ==
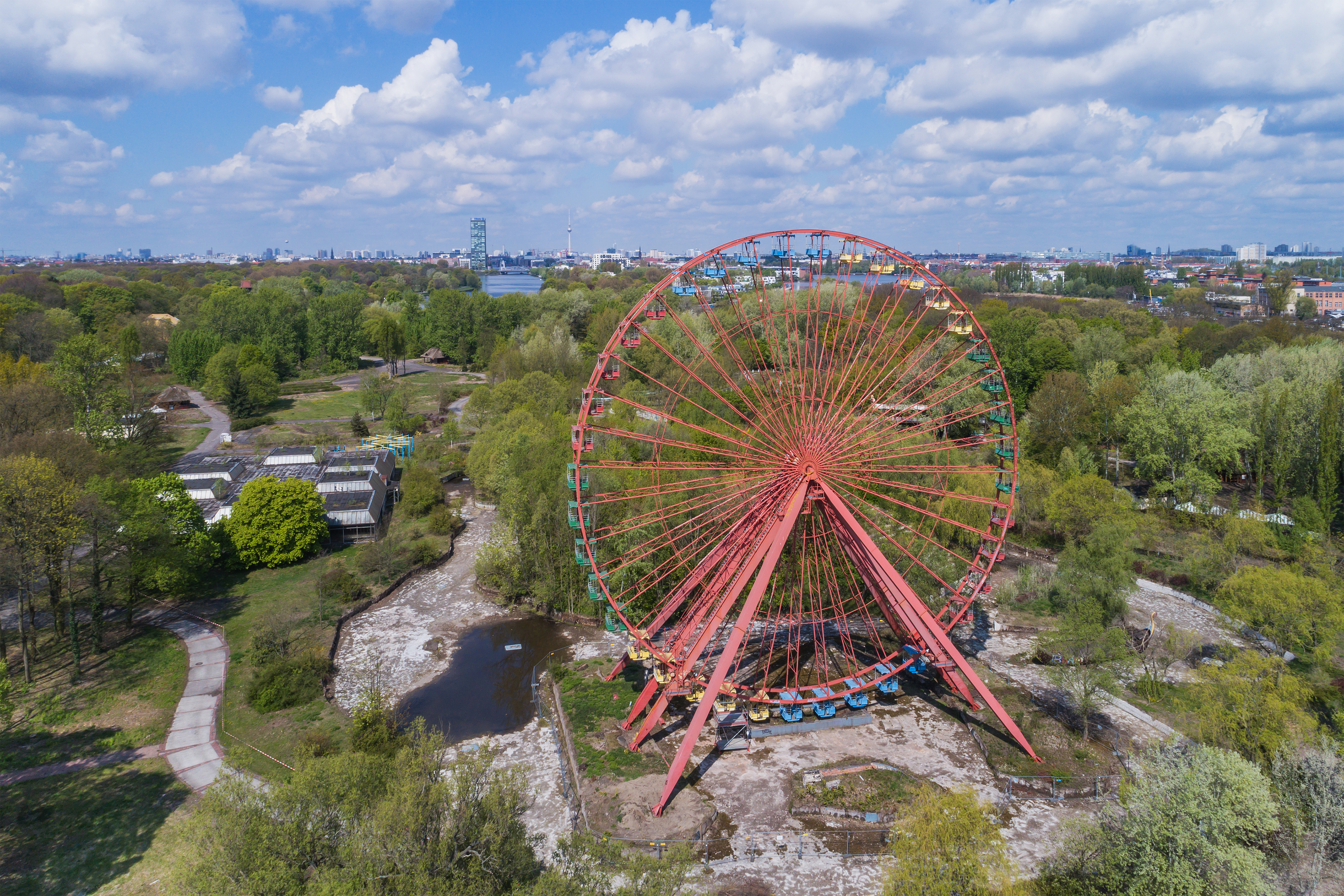
The Ferris wheel in 2017

=== 1969–1989 – Kulturpark Plänterwald ===
The entertainment park was opened in 1969 as Kulturpark Plänterwald, covering an area of 29.5 hectares. The area is situated in the north of the Plänterwald, next to the river Spree. It was the only constant entertainment park in East Germany, and the only such park in either East or West Berlin.

=== 1989–2001 – Spreepark Berlin ===
The VEB Kulturpark Berlin was de-nationalized in 1991, after East and West Germany were reunified, by the municipal authorities of Berlin. There were seven applicants to run the park; the company Spreepark Berlin GmbH received the contract. Crucially, the references of Norbert Witte of the company were not properly checked.

Under the Spreepark GmbH, new attractions were added and visitor numbers reached 1.5 million per annum. Later, the concept was changed, and the park was gradually transformed into a more Western-style amusement park. An entrance fee (adults: 29 DM, children: 27 DM) covering all individual attractions was charged, instead of visitors paying for each individual ride as before.

The asphalted surface around the Ferris wheel was taken up and converted into a water landscape. Roller coasters, two game water courses, a stage, a Western town and an English village were later added to the park.

From 1999 the park had large debts. An increase in the admission fee to 30 DM per person and the lack of parking contributed to a drop in visitor numbers, until, in 2001, only 400,000 visitors entered the park. In 2001, Spreepark GmbH announced that they were insolvent.

=== After 2002 ===
On 18 January 2002, Norbert Witte, together with his family and closest coworkers, moved to Lima, Peru. The authorities permitted them to ship six attractions (Fliegender Teppich, Butterfly, Spider, Baby-Flug, Wild River, and Jet Star), ostensibly for repair, in 20 shipping containers.

Since 2002, the park has not opened for visitors; in August 2002 it was declared insolvent. Debts at a level of €11,000,000 remained, and the area was allowed to fall into disrepair. The Ferris wheel was dismantled in 2021 and the parts kept for potential re-use. The remains of other attractions are still on the site.

In 2011, a scene for the action film Hanna was filmed at the park, as well as the music video for the single "Run Dry" by German band Sizarr.

Norbert Witte failed in his attempt to run a "Lunapark" in Lima. On 19 May 2004, he was sentenced to seven years in jail for attempting to smuggle 180 kg of cocaine with a value of £14 million from Peru to Germany in the masts of the Fliegender Teppich (Flying Carpet) ride. In October 2006, a Peruvian court sentenced Wittes' son, Marcel Witte, to 20 years for drug smuggling.

After 2011, guided tours were offered to the public at restricted times.

In March 2014, the City of Berlin bought the Spreepark, and guided tours ended. On the evening of 10 August 2014, major parts of the park were destroyed in a fire. Reports indicated that firefighters discovered two blazes 200 m apart that soon merged, suggesting that the fires might have been deliberately set.

The city chose Grün Berlin to restore the park, with a plan presented to the public in 2018 to restore it with an overlay of cultural and ecological content.

== Gallery ==
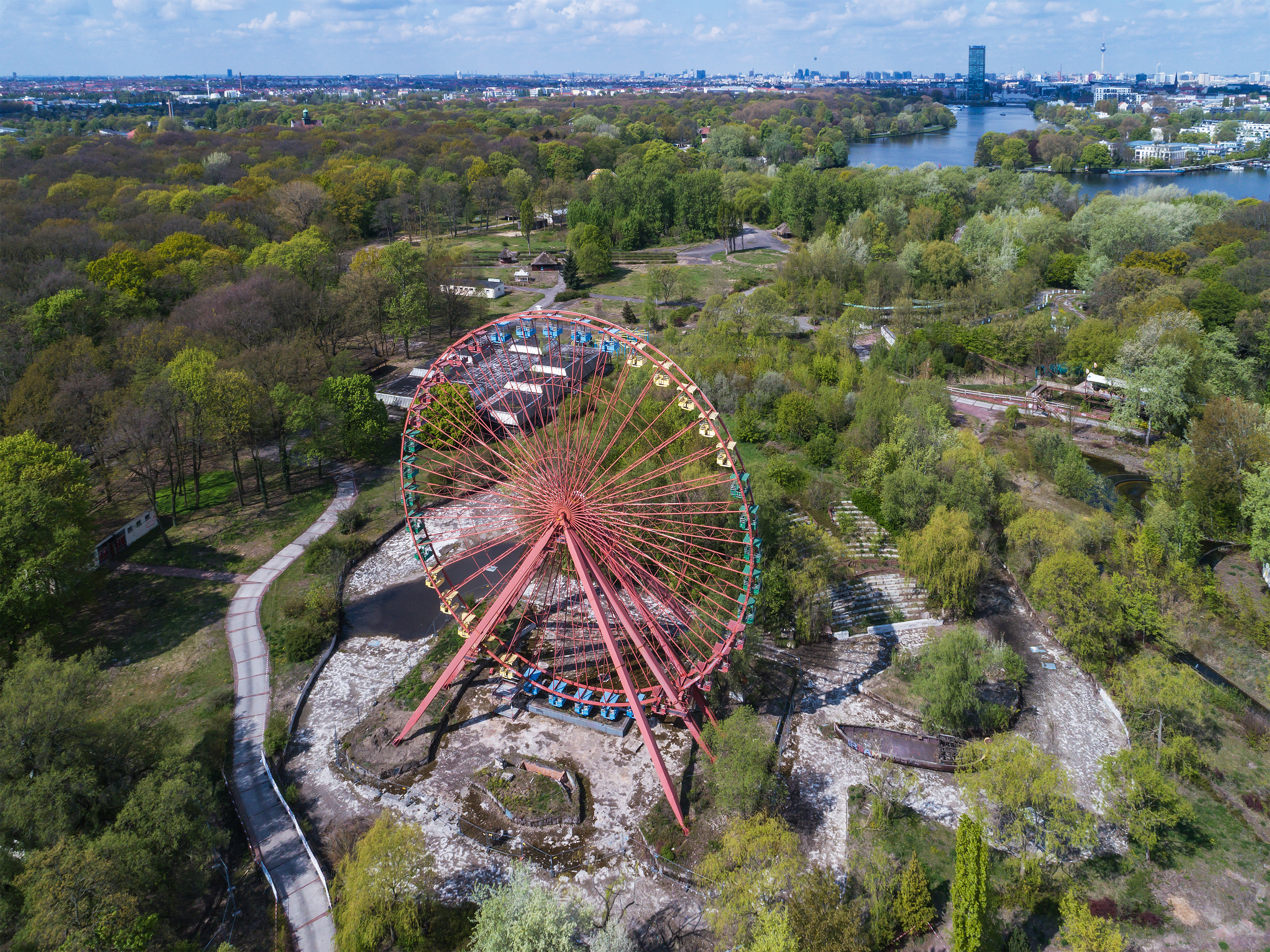
Aerial view with ferris wheel

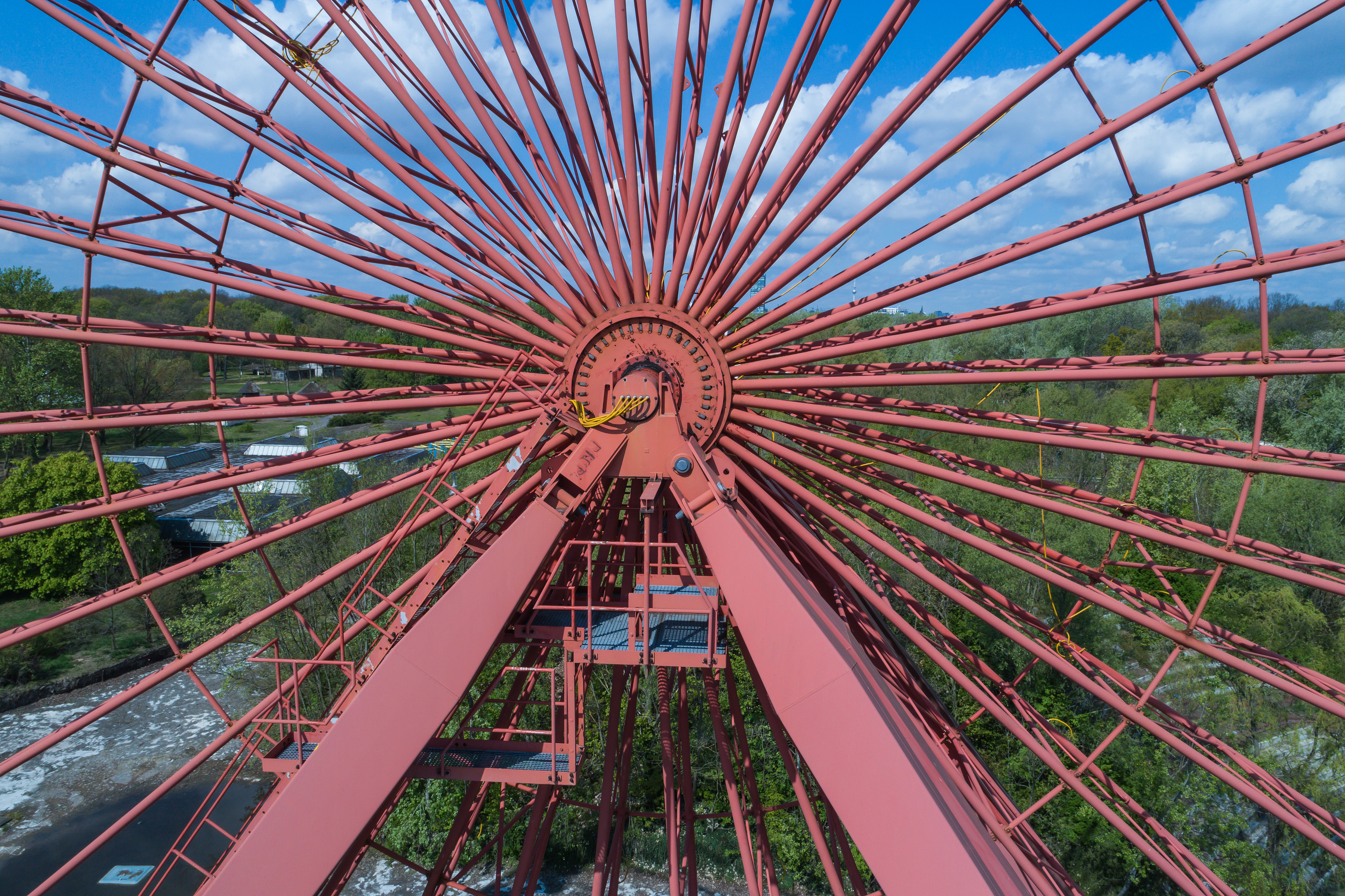
Ferris wheel, detail

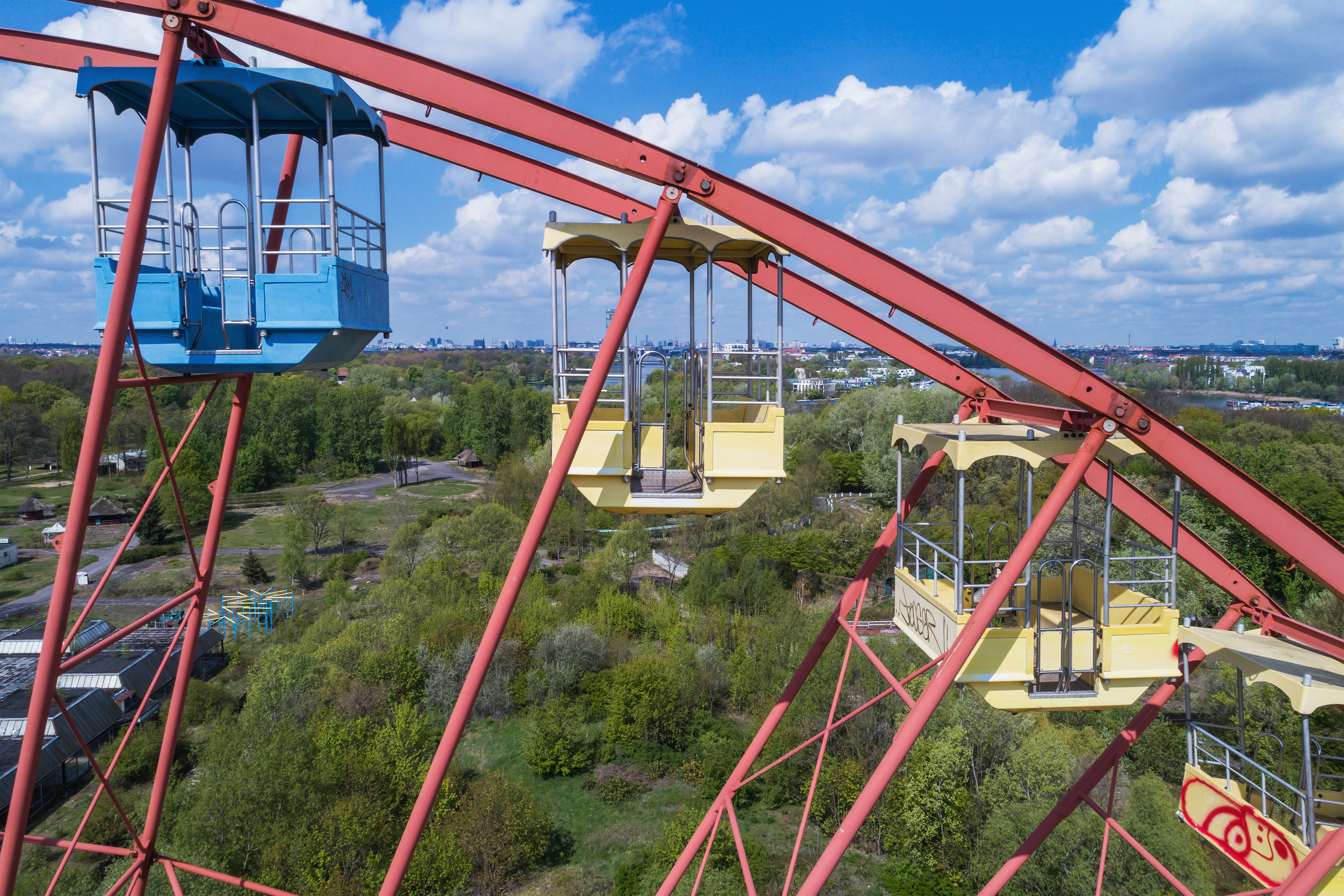
Ferris wheel, detail

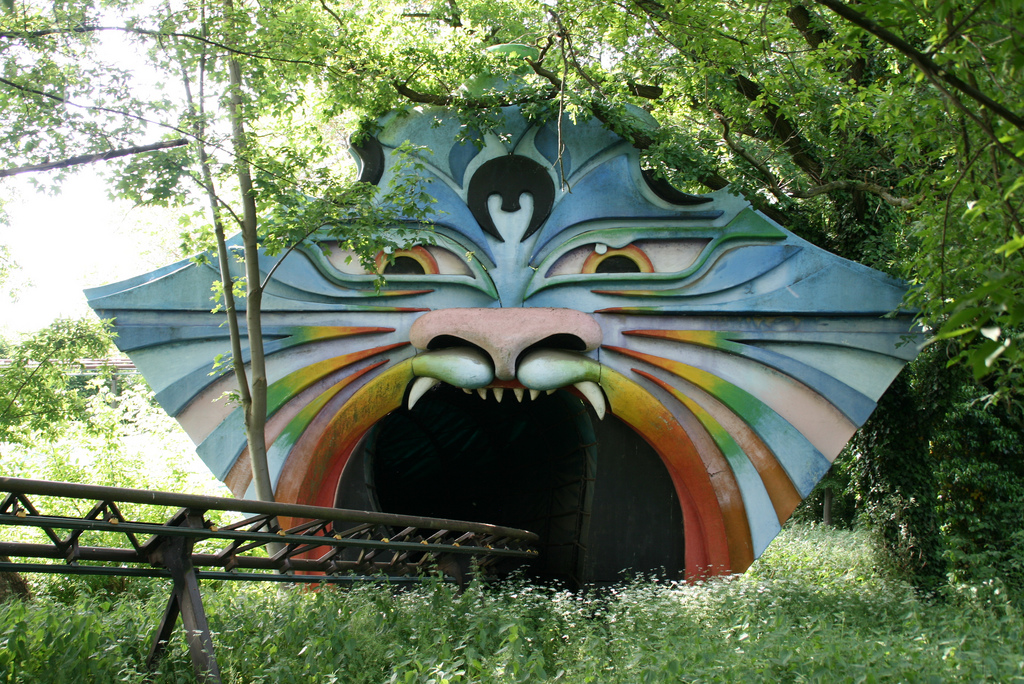
SpreeBlitz

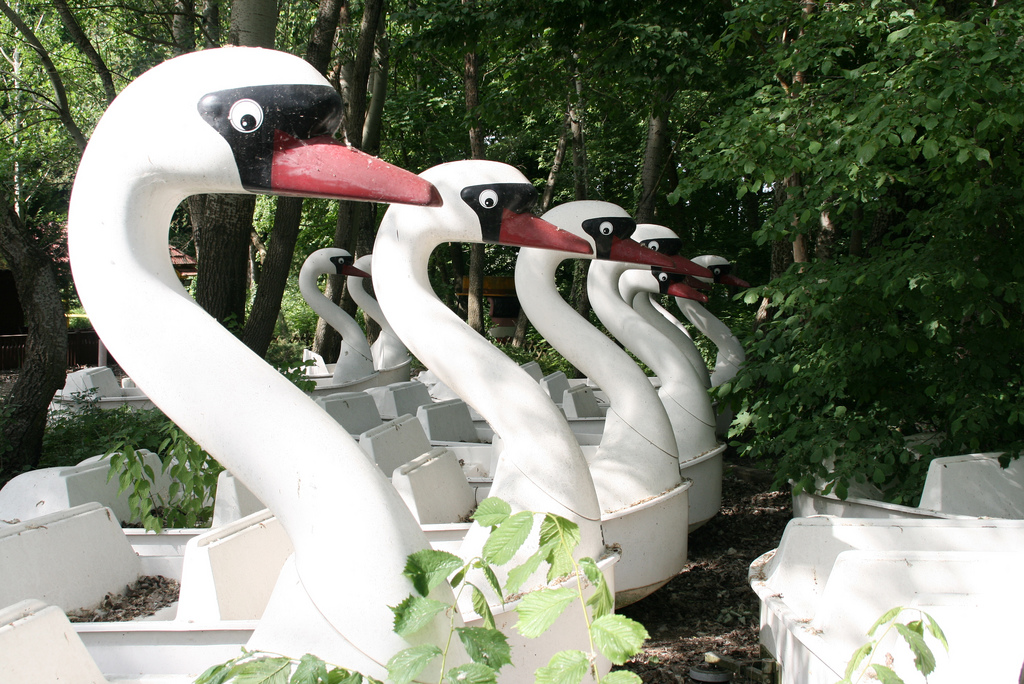
Swan ride

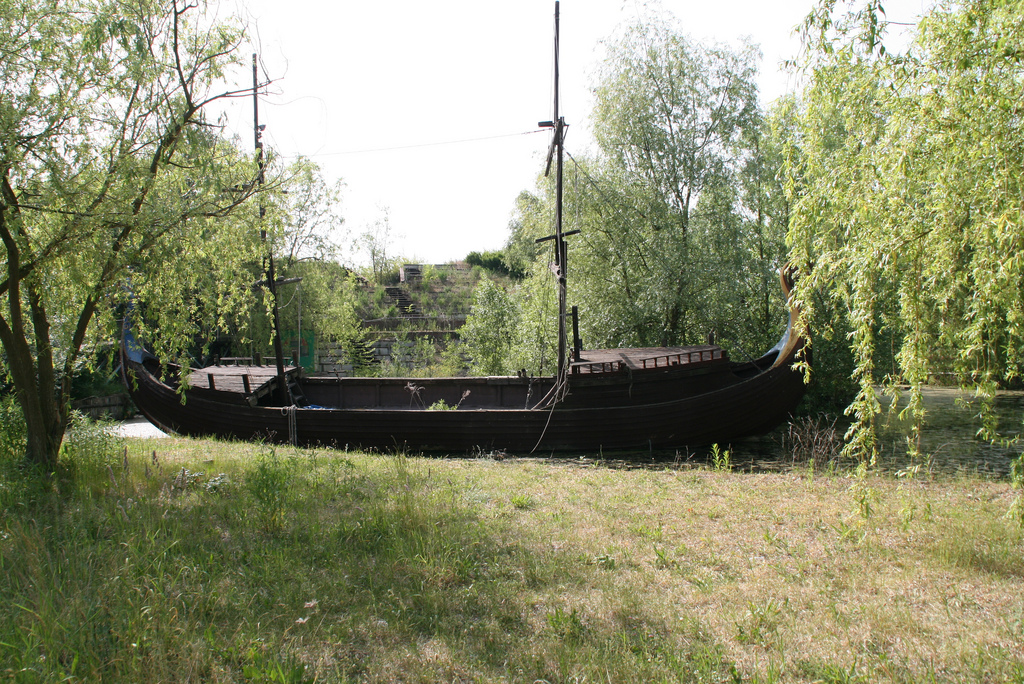
Pirate ship

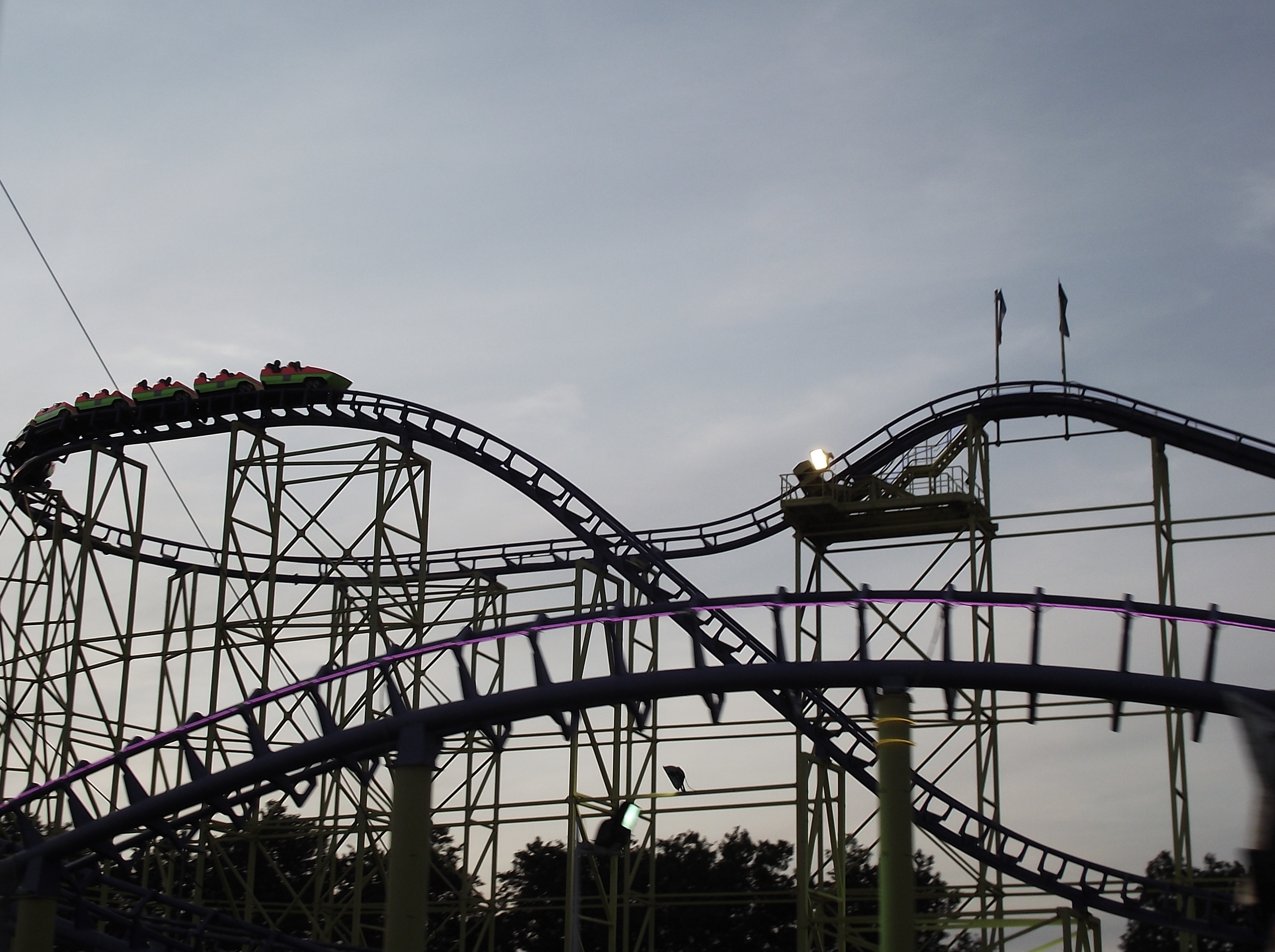
Mega Looping Bahn at Europark
