= Baumschulenweg =

- Quarter of Berlin
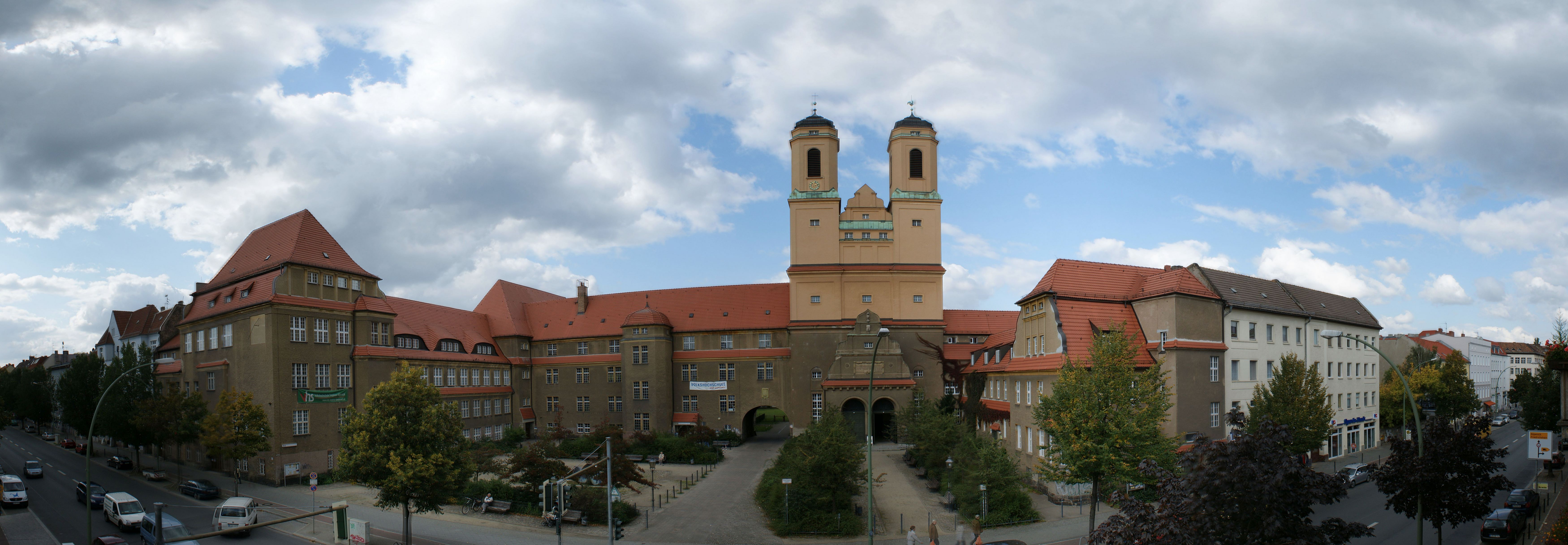
- Panorama of the church "Zum Vaterhaus"

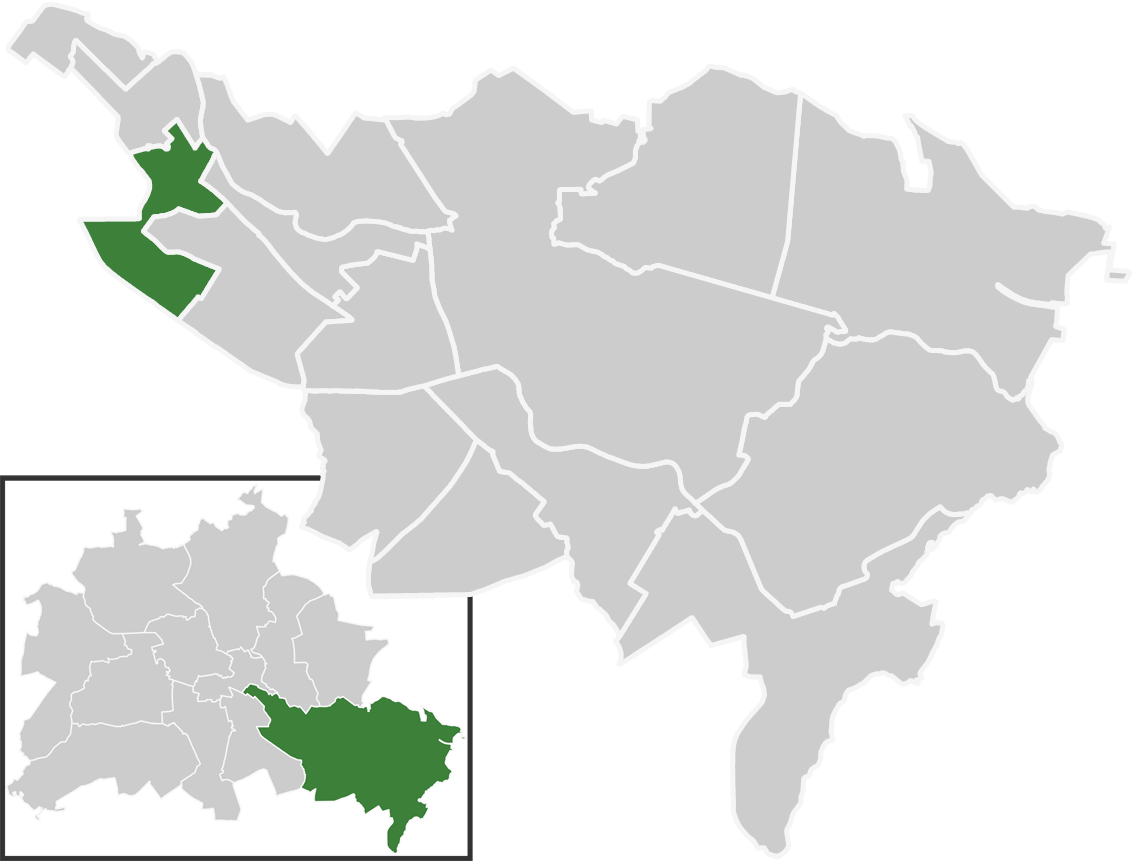
- Location of Baumschulenweg in Treptow-Köpenick and Berlin
- Interactive map of Baumschulenweg
- Location within Germany Location within Berlin
- Coordinates: 52°27′54″N 13°29′10″E
- Country: Germany
- State: Berlin
- City: Berlin
- Borough: Treptow-Köpenick
- Founded: 1823
- Subdivisions: 1 zone

Area
  - Total: 4.82 km^{2} (1.86 sq mi)
- Elevation: 34 m (112 ft)

Population (2024-12-31)
  - Total: 19,404
  - Density: 4,030/km^{2} (10,400/sq mi)
- Time zone: UTC+01:00 (CET)
  - Summer (DST): UTC+02:00 (CEST)
- Postal codes: 12437
- Vehicle registration: B

Baumschulenweg (German pronunciation: [ˈbaʊ̯mʃuːlənˌveːk]) is a German locality (Ortsteil) within the Berlin borough (Bezirk) of Treptow-Köpenick. Until 2001 it was part of the former borough of Treptow. Its name means road (weg) of the plant nurseries (Baumschulen). It was named after the Späth nursery.

== History ==
The village was first settled around 1823 and in 1920, as part of the former municipality of Treptow, it merged into Berlin with the "Greater Berlin Act". In 1945 it became an autonomous locality separated from Alt-Treptow. From 1961 to 1989 Baumschulenweg was crossed by the Berlin Wall due to its position on East Berlin partially bounded by West Berlin. Sonnenallee once featured a checkpoint to Neukölln.

== Geography ==
=== Overview ===
Baumschulenweg is located in south-east Berlin and is crossed by the river Spree and the canals of Britz and Teltow. It borders with Plänterwald, Oberschöneweide, Niederschöneweide, Johannisthal, Neukölln, Britz and Rudow. The boundaries with this 3 Ortsteile of Neukölln district are almost totally remarked by the two canals.

=== Subdivision ===
Baumschulenweg counts 1 zone (Ortslage):

- Späthsfelde

The area, divided by the Zweigkanal and linked by the bridge Baumschulenbrücke to the centre of Baumschulenweg, is the southern and the biggest one.

== Transport ==
Baumschulenweg is served by the S-Bahn lines S45, S46, S47, S8, S85 and S9 at the homonymous railway station. It counts also the ferry line F11 to Oberschöneweide over the Spree and is crossed, in Späthsfelde borders, by the motorway A113. The exits serving the locality are "Späthstraße" (n.2) and "Johannisthaler Chaussee" (n.3).

== Personalities ==
- Alwin Gerisch (1857–1922), politician
- Franz Späth (1839–1913), botanist

== Photogallery ==
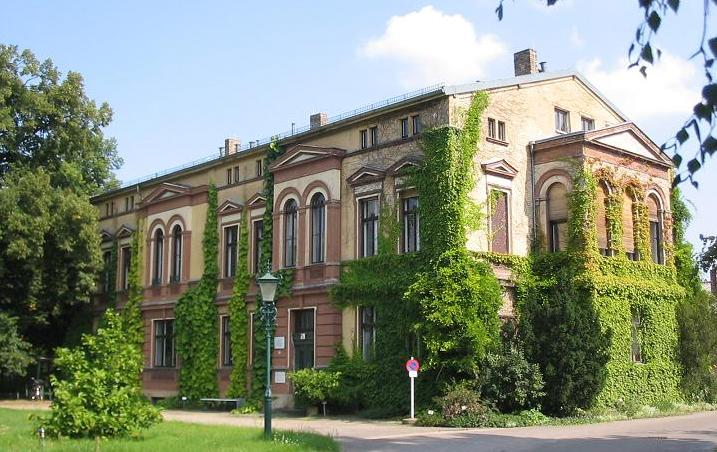
Franz Späth's villa in the "Späth-Arboretum"

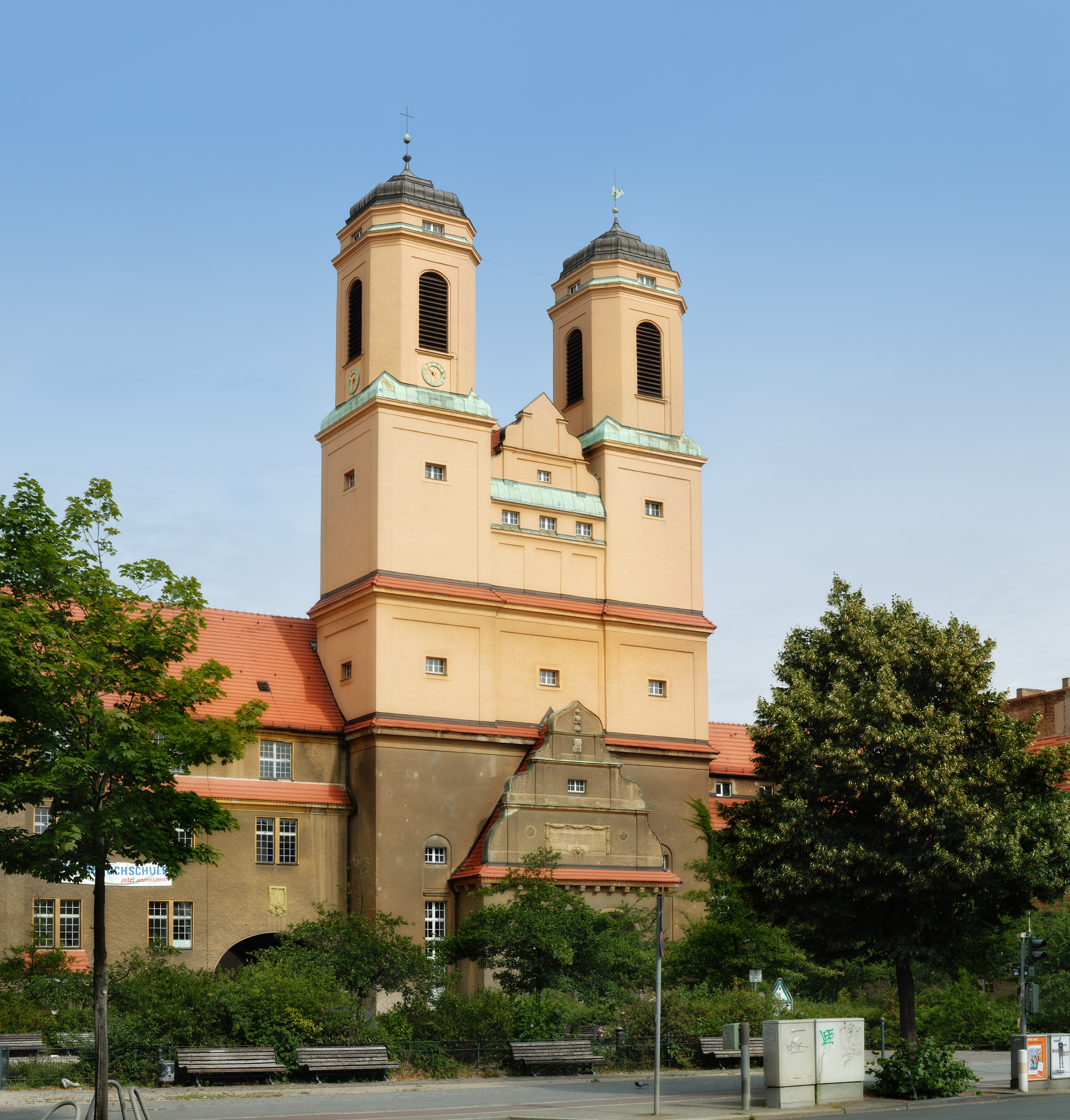
Church "Zum Vaterhaus"

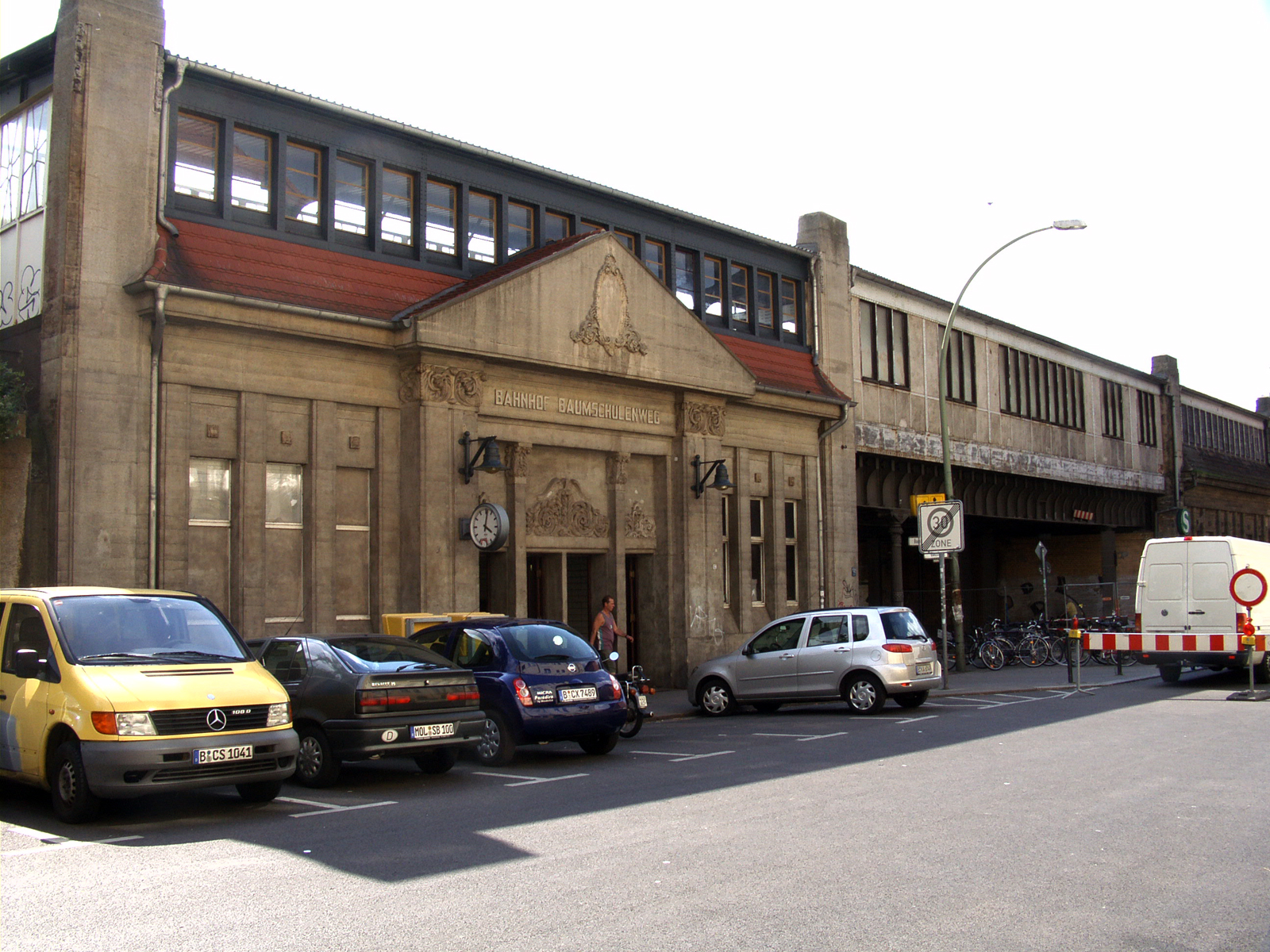
Berlin-Baumschulenweg S-Bahn station

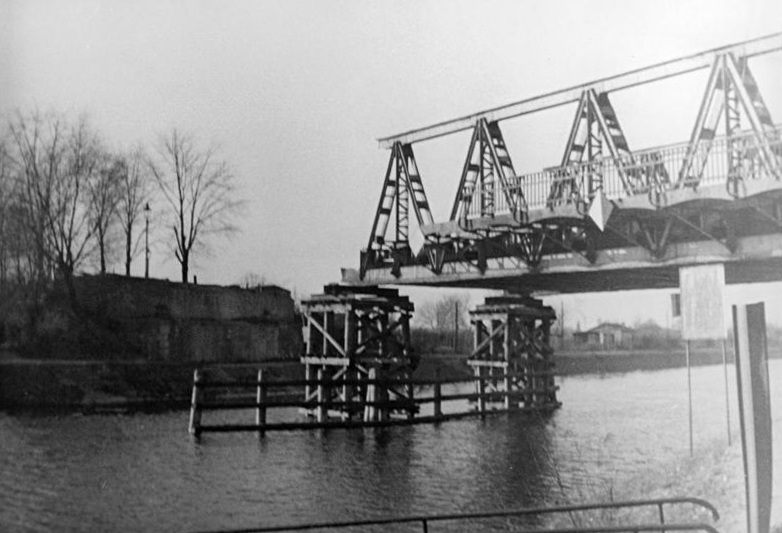
The Baumschulenbrücke in 1950
