= Plänterwald =

- Quarter of Berlin
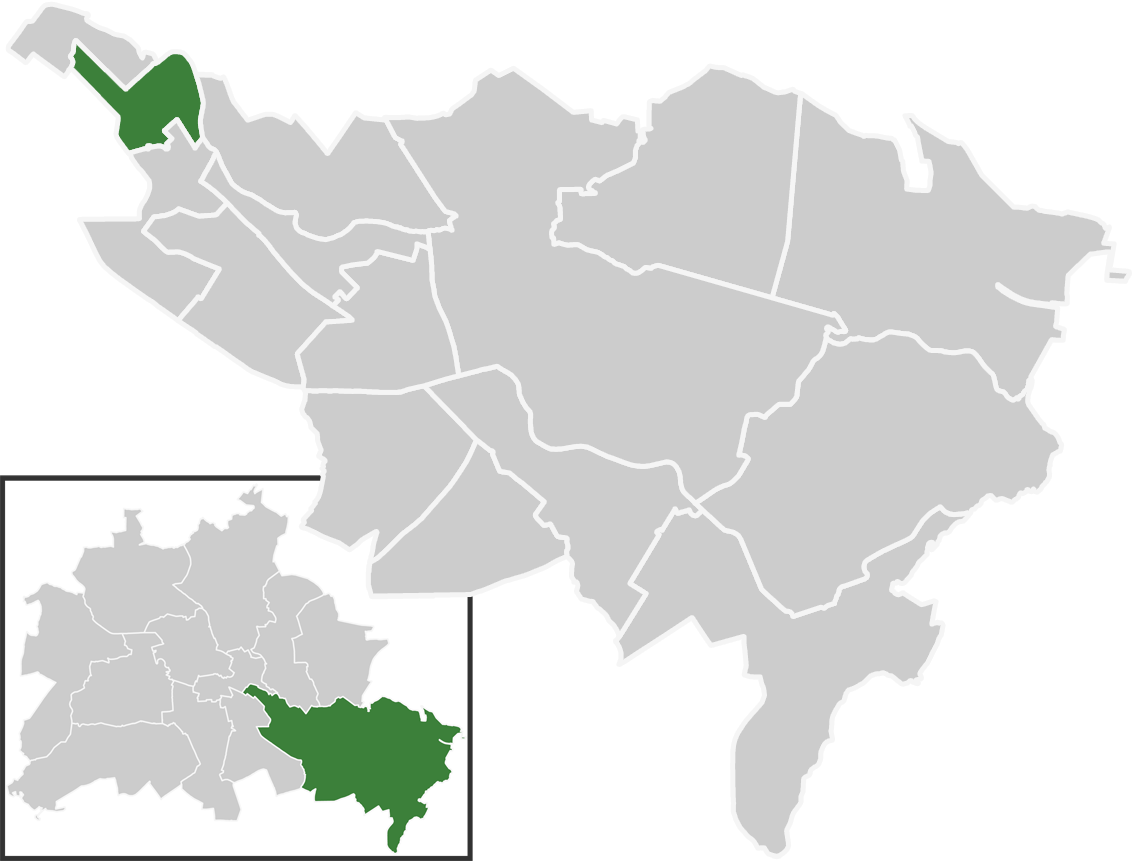
- Location of Plänterwald in Treptow-Köpenick and Berlin
- Interactive map of Plänterwald
- Location within Germany Location within Berlin
- Coordinates: 52°28′47″N 13°28′31″E
- Country: Germany
- State: Berlin
- City: Berlin
- Borough: Treptow-Köpenick
- Founded: 1760

Area
  - Total: 3.01 km^{2} (1.16 sq mi)
- Elevation: 34 m (112 ft)

Population (2024-12-31)
  - Total: 11,753
  - Density: 3,900/km^{2} (10,100/sq mi)
- Time zone: UTC+01:00 (CET)
  - Summer (DST): UTC+02:00 (CEST)
- Postal codes: 12435, 12437
- Vehicle registration: B

Plänterwald (German pronunciation: [ˈplɛntɐˌvalt]) is a German locality (Ortsteil) within the Berlin borough (Bezirk) of Treptow-Köpenick. Until 2001 it was part of the former borough of Treptow and the site of its former town hall.

== History ==
The name Plänterwald derives from the German word Plenterwald, referring to a timber forest. The 89 hectares of the forest were first economically used in 1760, and in 1969 the northern side became part of the Spreepark (better known as Cultural Park Plänterwald). In 1920, as part of the former municipality of Treptow, it merged into Berlin with the "Greater Berlin Act". Crossed by the "Berlin Wall" on its borders with Neukölln from 1961 to 1989, the locality became autonomous in 1997, separated from Alt-Treptow and Baumschulenweg.

== Geography ==
Located in south-east Berlin and crossed by the river Spree, Plänterwald borders with the localities of Alt-Treptow, Oberschöneweide (separated by the Spree), Baumschulenweg and Neukölln. The Spree also divides it from the peninsula of Stralau (a zone of Friedrichshain, in Friedrichshain-Kreuzberg district) and Rummelsburg (in Lichtenberg).

== Spreepark ==
Within Plänterwald is Spreepark, an abandoned amusement park, which operated from October 1969 until 2001.

The owner of Spreepark, Norbert Witte, went bankrupt and left Germany rather abruptly. He took several of the park's rides including the Jet Star and Fun Express with him to Peru where he was to open a small park called Lunapark at Jockey Plaza in Lima, Peru. Some of the rides were damaged in transit and then followed by legal discussions of who would pay for the damages.

== Transport ==
The locality is served by the S-Bahn lines S8, S85 and S9 at the homonymous railway station. It is also served by several bus lines.

== Photogallery ==
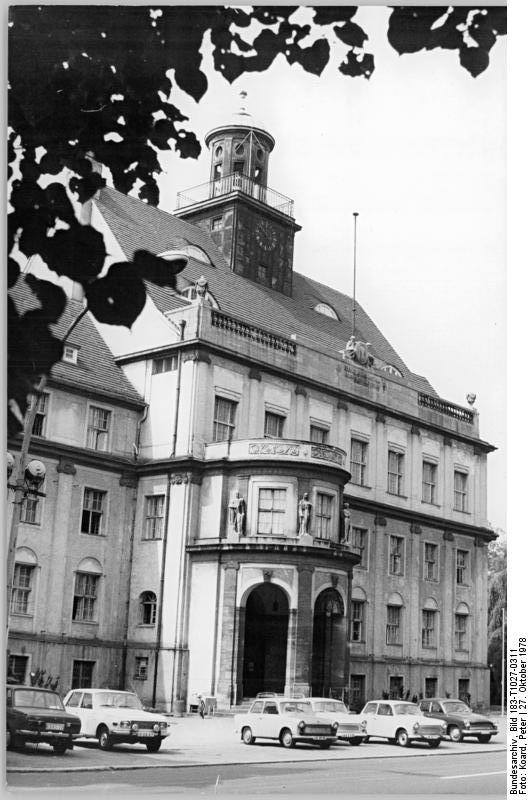
Treptow town hall in 1978

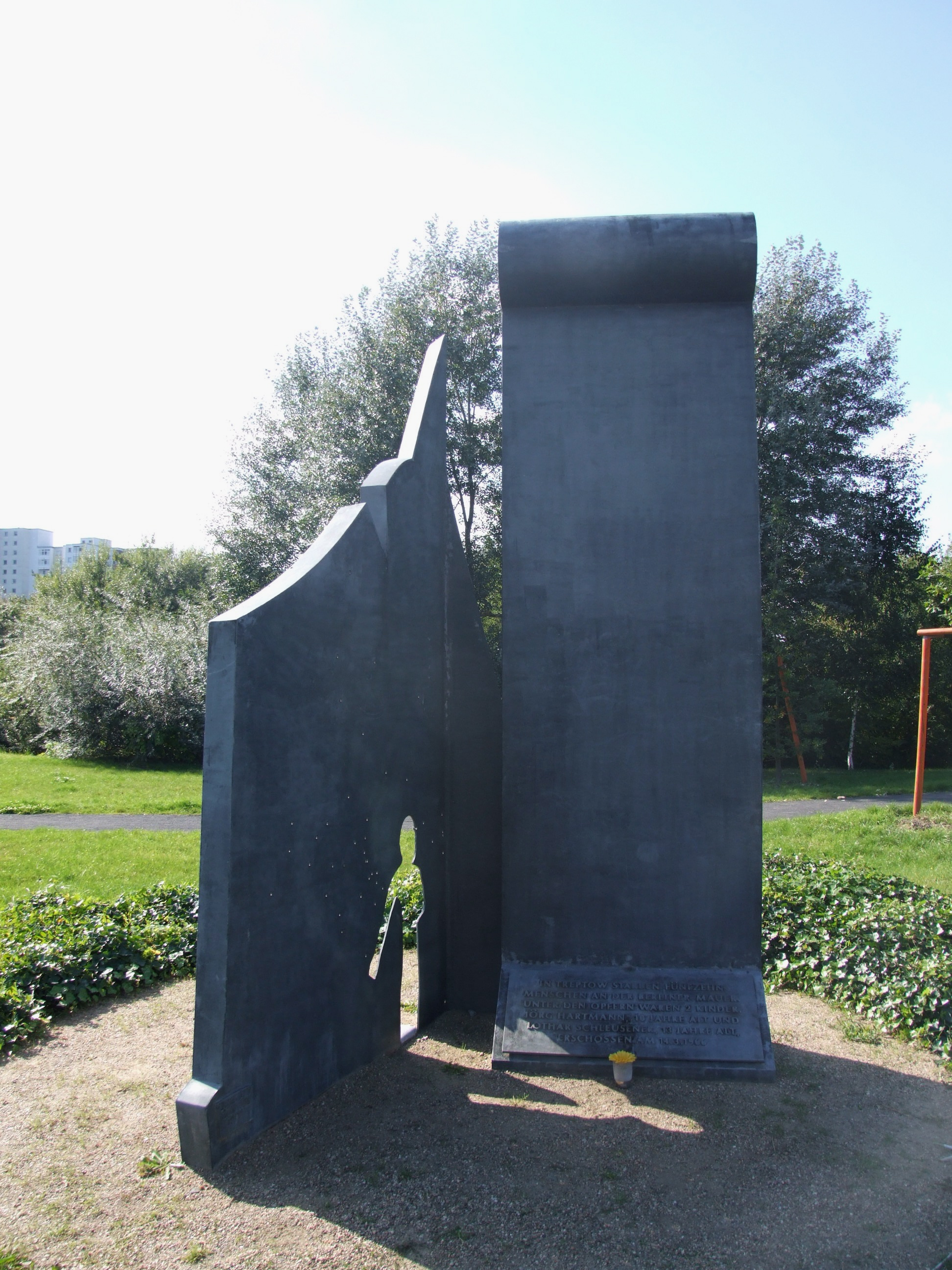
Monument to 15 victims from Treptow, killed at the Berlin Wall

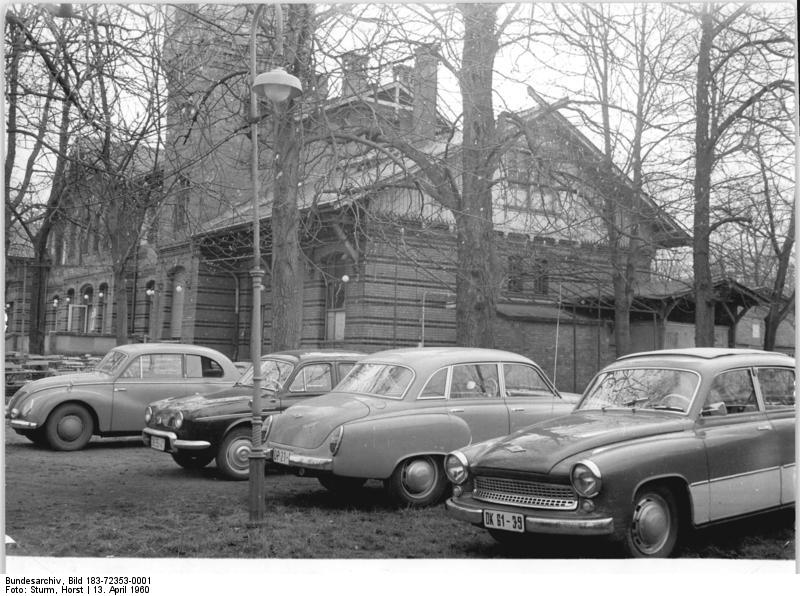
The Eierhäuschen in 1960

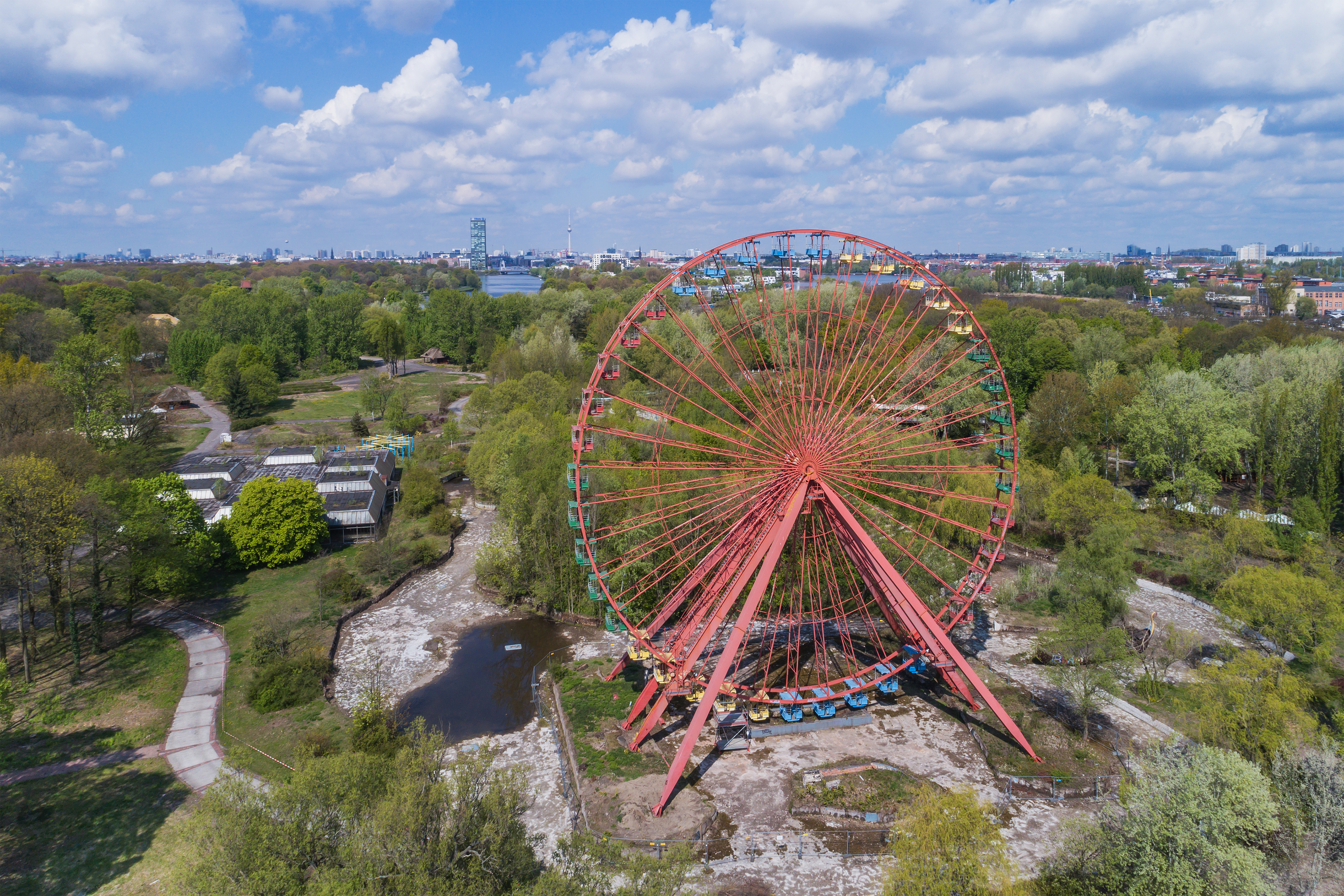
Abandoned Spreepark
