= Treptowers =

Complex of buildings in the Alt-Treptow district of Berlin, Germany

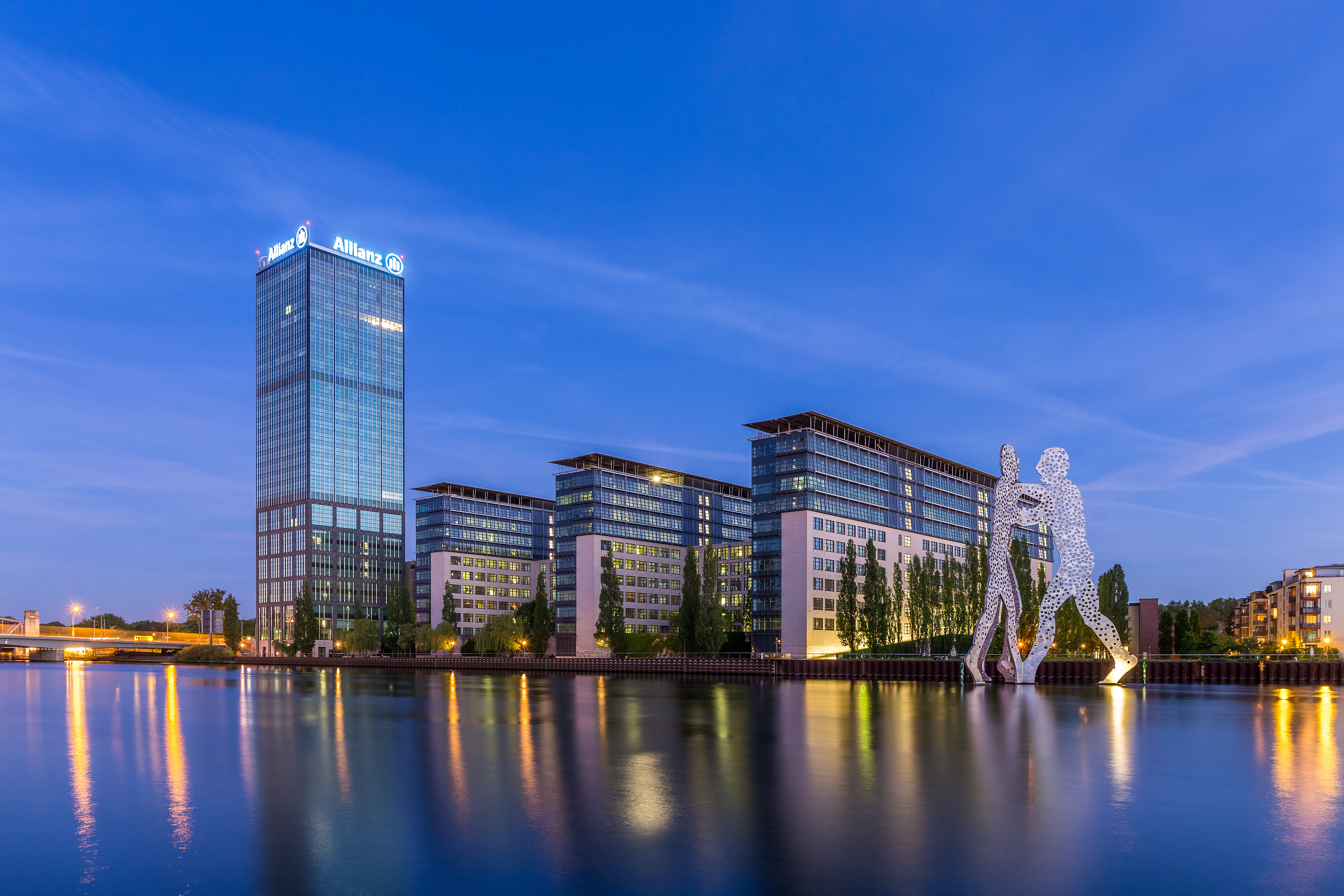
- Interactive map of the Treptowers area

General information
- Status: Completed
- Location: Treptow, Berlin
- Coordinates: 52.4953°N 13.4611°E
- Opening: 1998

Height
- Roof: 125.00 m (410.10 ft)

Technical details
- Floor count: 32

The Treptowers is a complex of buildings with a distinctive high-rise in the Alt-Treptow district of Berlin, Germany. Completed in 1998, the complex is located on the river Spree. The name "Treptowers" is a portmanteau word from Treptow and the English word "tower".

== Genesis and architecture ==
The Treptowers complex consists of four buildings and is the result of an architectural competition held in 1993 and won by the architect Gerhard Spangenberg. The detailed planning and building was carried out by a partnership of architects Schweger and Reichel + Stauth from Brunswick. Roland Ernst joined Urban GmbH & Co. as project developer and overseer of construction. The final construction cost totalled 190 million Deutsche Marks.

The buildings were constructed on the site of a former electrical appliance factory complex, which was built in 1926 by AEG. After World War II, the plant was expropriated by VEB Elektro-Apparate-Werke Berlin-Treptow, a state-owned company in the German Democratic Republic, and production continued until 1995.

The buildings have a square floor plan with a steel and glass facade, though portions of each building have stone facades to create a unified architectural look with neighboring buildings. At 125 meters, Treptowers is the tallest office building in Berlin and the same height as the Park Inn.

The 30 meter high sculpture Molecule Men by Jonathan Borofsky was built in 1999 and sits in front of Treptowers in the River Spree. The sculpture's three figures represent the three Berlin districts of Treptow, Kreuzberg and Friedrichshain. Treptowers also houses a permanent exhibition of 500 works by contemporary artists.

The Federal Criminal Police Office has a branch inside the building.

In 2013, the complex was acquired by an investment company, supported by Japanese investors, for approximately €70,000,000.

== See also ==
- List of tallest buildings in Berlin
