= Badeschiff =

Floating public swimming pool in Berlin, Germany

Coordinates: 52°29′52″N 13°27′13″E

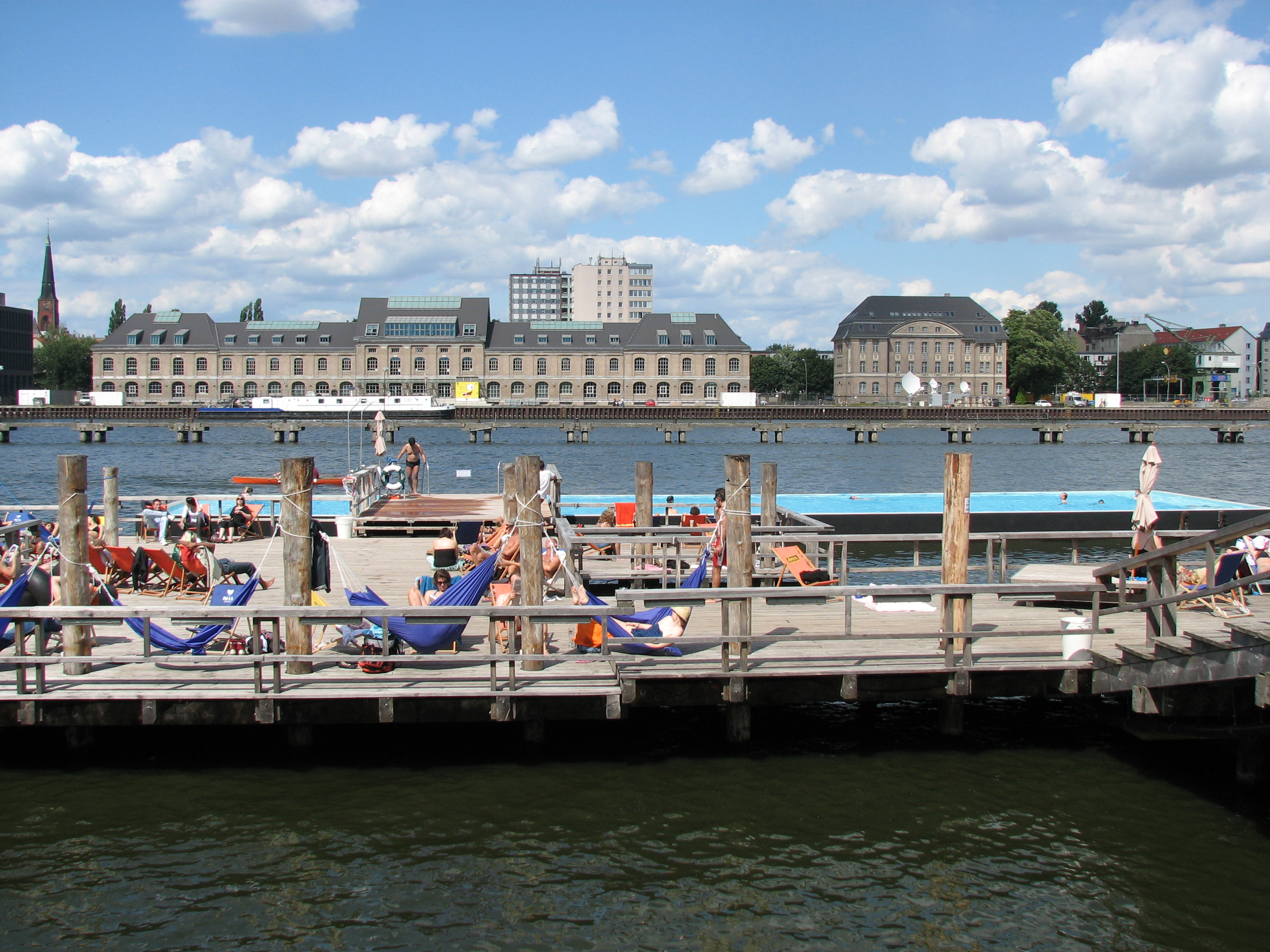
The Badeschiff in July

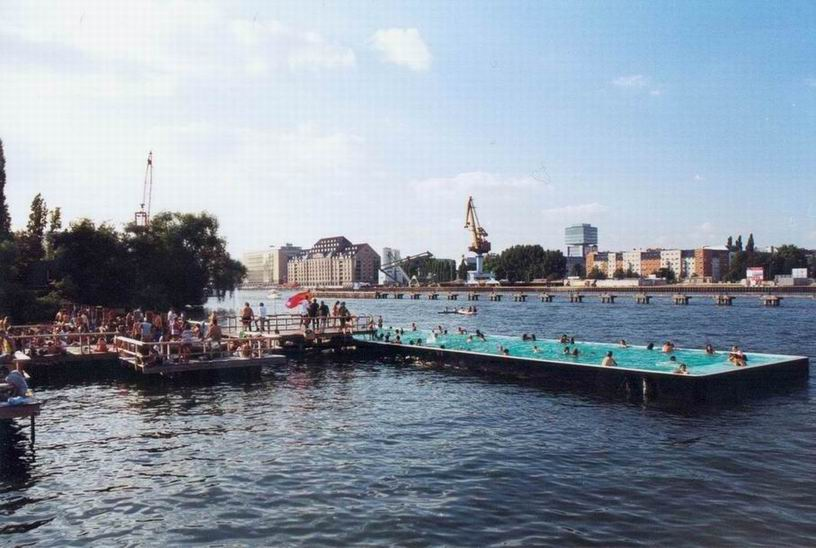

The Badeschiff (in English, "bathing ship") is a floating public swimming pool in Berlin, the capital city of Germany. Situated in the East Harbour section of the River Spree, the Badeschiff allows citizens to swim in a sanitary environment near the river. The Spree itself is far too polluted to permit safe swimming.

The Badeschiff opened in the summer of 2004 as an art project organized by the Stadtkunstprojekte (City Art Project Society) of Berlin. It was created after a competition won by three architects with Fernando Menis as head architect and with the participation in the artistic part of the project of local artist, Susanne Lorenz, but the original idea was created for Spanish architects Artengo, Fernando Menis and Pastrana with the help of Gil Wilk, to enliven city life along a long-neglected stretch of the Spree. The architects were inspired in the blue ocean of their native island, Tenerife.

The pool was converted from the hull of a vessel measuring eight by thirty-two metres. It is open to the public daily from 8am to midnight. Disc jockeys commonly spin records outside the pool entrance where there is also a bar.
