= Sizarr =

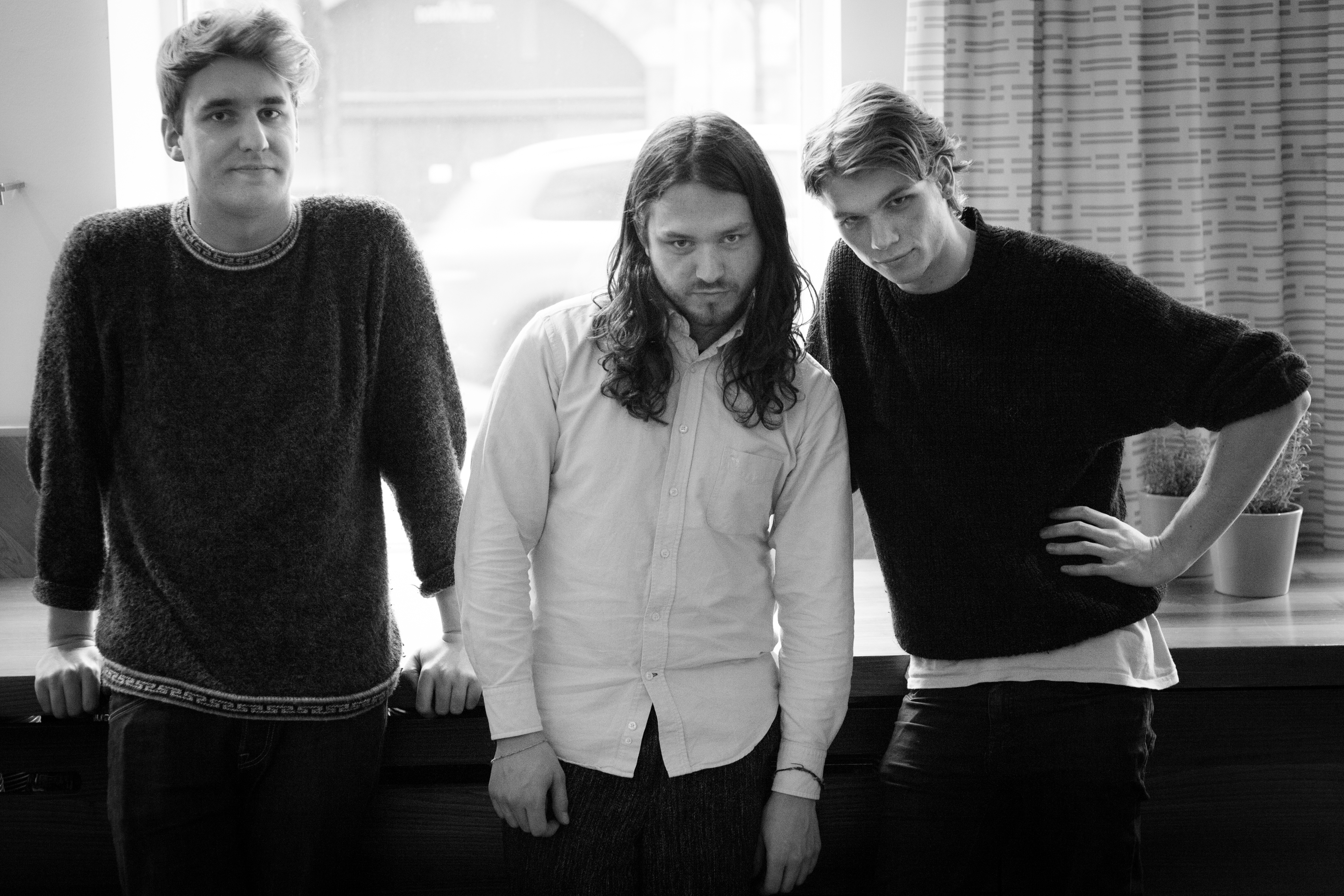
- Sizarr (2015)

Background information
- Origin: Landau, Germany
- Genres: Alternative rock, electronic
- Years active: 2009–2018
- Label: Four Music (Sony Music Entertainment)
- Members: Deaf Sty (Fabian Altstötter); P Monaee (Philipp Hülsenbeck); Gora Sou (Marc Übel)

Sizarr was a German electronic, post-punk band from Landau, Germany. The band consists of Deaf Sty, * 1991, (vocals/guitar/synth), P Monaee, * 1991, (vocals/guitar/synth) and Gora Sou, * 1993, (drums/machines).

The band was founded in Landau, Germany, in 2009.

In April 2010 Sizarr was supporting act for These New Puritans in Heidelberg, Germany. This was followed by a number of performances at important German music festivals such as Dockville, On3 Festival and Melt! festival in Summer 2010. They also supported a number of major acts such as Kele from Bloc Party and Broken Bells (Danger Mouse/James Mercer).

In 2011, the band continued to play the German festival circuit with dates at Modular Festival in Augsburg, Melt Festival 2011, Reeperbahn Festival in Hamburg and Iceland's Airwaves Festival.

Since 2011 the band is mentioned and featured in a number of German music publications, such as 2011 the February edition of Rolling Stone, Meier, Coolture, Intro, Mitteschön, Musikexpress and 2012 on West German Broadcasting, n-tv or Spiegel Online, the most visited news website written in German.

Their debut album Psycho Boy Happy was released on September 14, 2012.

On September 12, 2018, the band announced their break-up.

== Musical style ==
Sizarr use a mixture of guitars, drums, synthesisers, loops and samples to create a post-punk sound. Deaf Sty's vocals are reminiscent of James Blake and Jeff Buckley, but have a rawer rasp like that of Hamilton Leithauser from The Walkmen.

The percussion of Gora Sou uses live Latin rhythms on top of synthesised beats, not dissimilar to those found on Friendly Fires records.

The synth melodies and guitar hooks, often use a hypnotic rhythm typical of Berlin Techno or Deep House.
