= Teltow Canal =

Canal in Germany

Coordinates: 52°26′47″N 13°28′14″E

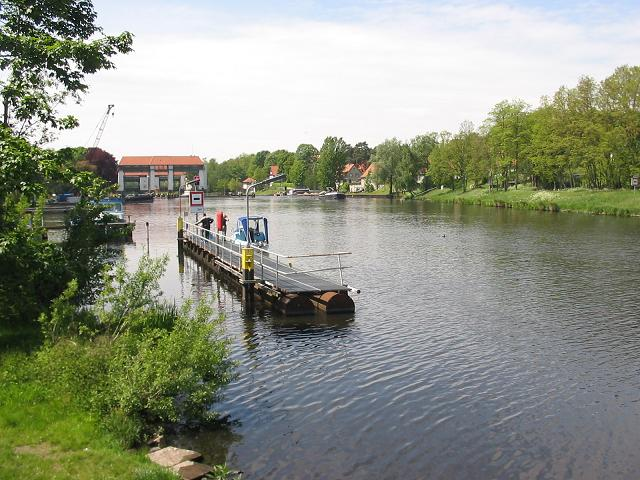
- The canal near Kleinmachnow lock
- Interactive map of Teltow Canal

Specifications
- Length: 37.83 km (23.51 miles)
- Minimum boat draft: 1.75 metres (5.7 ft)
- Minimum boat air draft: 4.4 metres (14 ft)

History
- Construction began: 1900
- Date completed: 1906

Geography
- Start point: River Havel
- End point: River Dahme

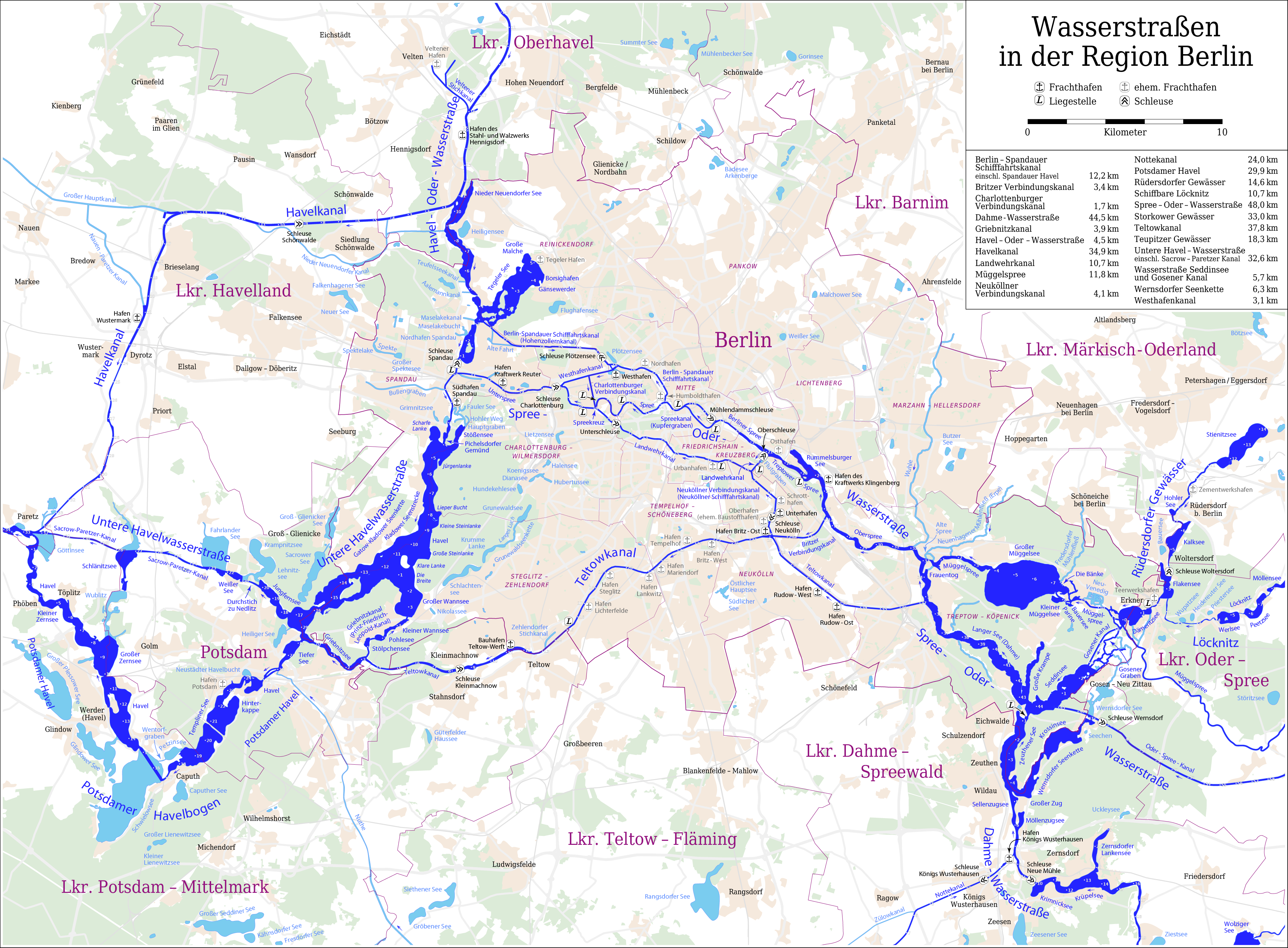
Map of waterways in the Berlin region, with the Teltow Canal slightly below the centre

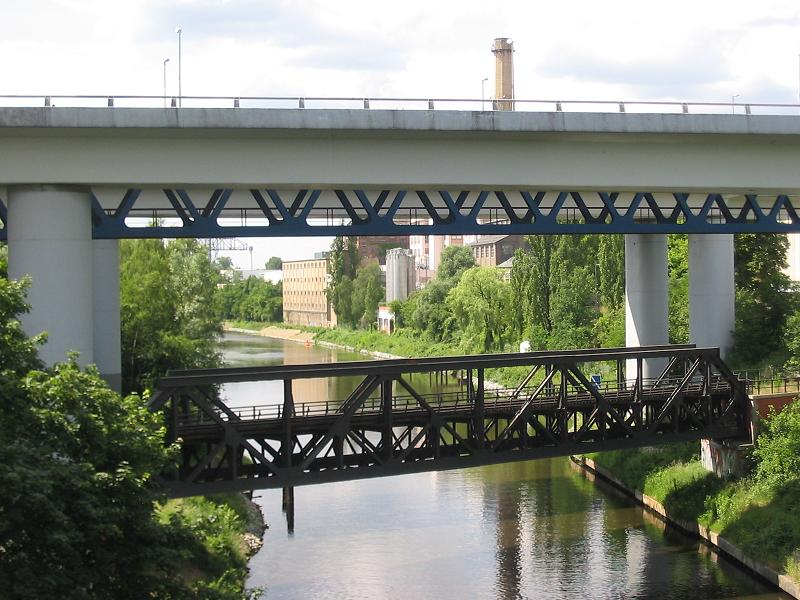
Rail and motorway bridges over the canal

The Teltow Canal, also known as the Teltowkanal in German, is a canal to the south of Berlin, the capital city of Germany. The canal lies in both the states of Berlin and Brandenburg, and at points forms the boundary between the two. It takes its name from the region of Teltow and town of Teltow which lie on its course. The canal was constructed between 1900 and 1906, when it was opened by Wilhelm II.

The canal is 37.83 kilometres (23.51 mi) in length and links the River Havel near the city of Potsdam with the River Dahme near Köpenick in Berlin's eastern suburbs. The Dahme provides a link to the Oder-Spree Canal, and hence to the River Oder and Poland. Whilst the Dahme is a tributary of the River Spree, itself a navigable tributary of the Havel, the Teltow Canal offers the advantage of bypassing the centre of Berlin, with its heavy river traffic.

At its western end, the Teltow Canal incorporates the Griebnitzsee lake which links to the Havel in Potsdam. The Griebnitz Canal provides a second link to the Havel from the eastern end of the Griebnitzsee. Towards its eastern end, the Teltow Canal is linked to the Landwehr Canal by the Neukölln Ship Canal, while the Britz Canal connects the Teltow Canal with the Spree.

There is only one lock on the canal, at Kleinmachnow. The canal is navigable by boats with a draught of up to 1.75 metres (5 ft 9 in) and with a maximum bridge clearance of 4.4 metres (14 ft).
