= Britz Canal =

Canal in Berlin, Germany

Coordinates: 52°27′32″N 13°29′0″E

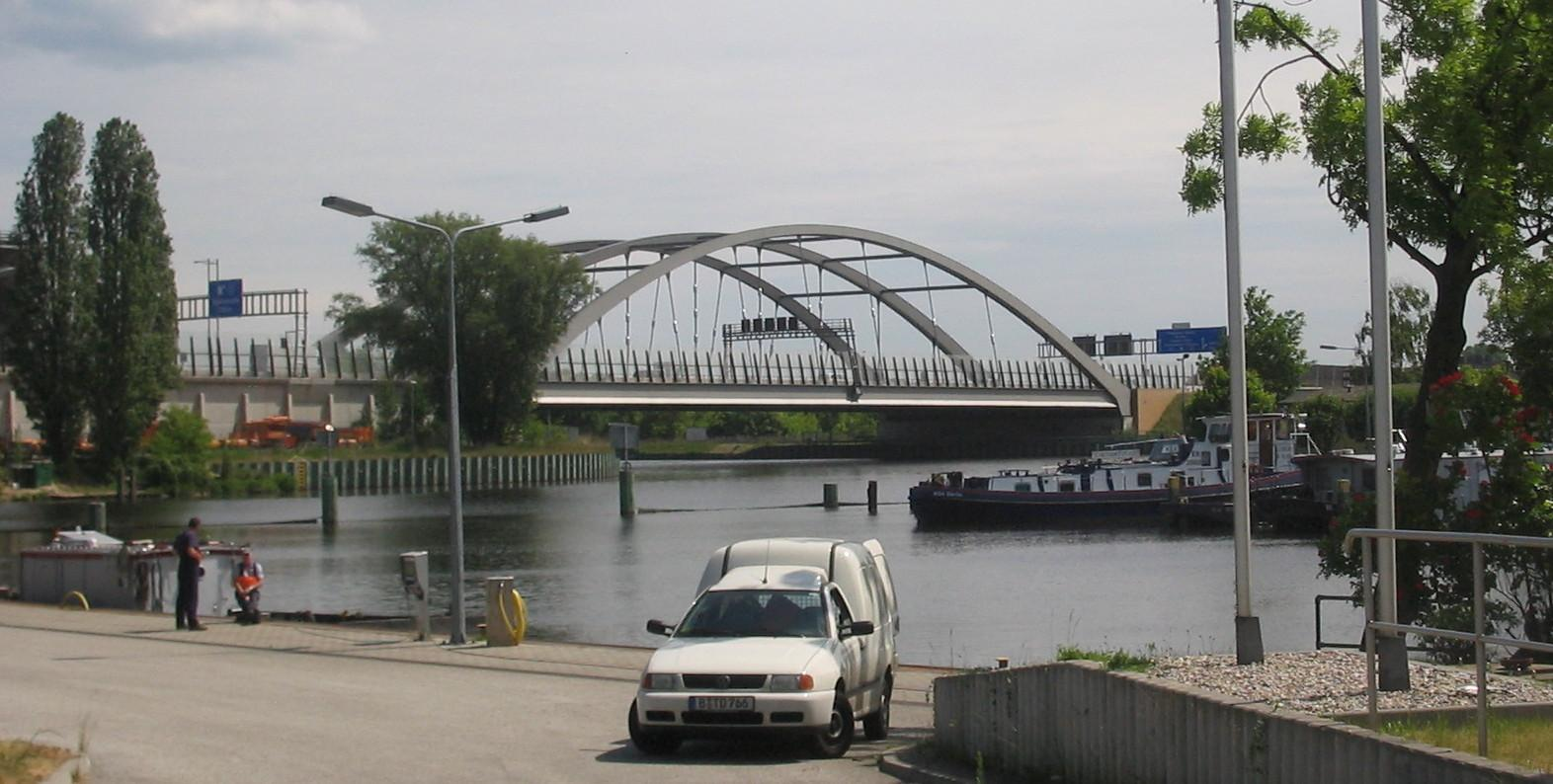
- The junction of the Neukölln Ship Canal (on the left), Britz Canal (in the center under the bridge) and Teltow Canal (on the right)
- Interactive map of Britz Canal

Specifications
- Length: 3.4 km (2.1 miles)

History
- Construction began: 1900
- Date completed: 1906

Geography
- Start point: Neukölln Ship Canal
- End point: Teltow Canal

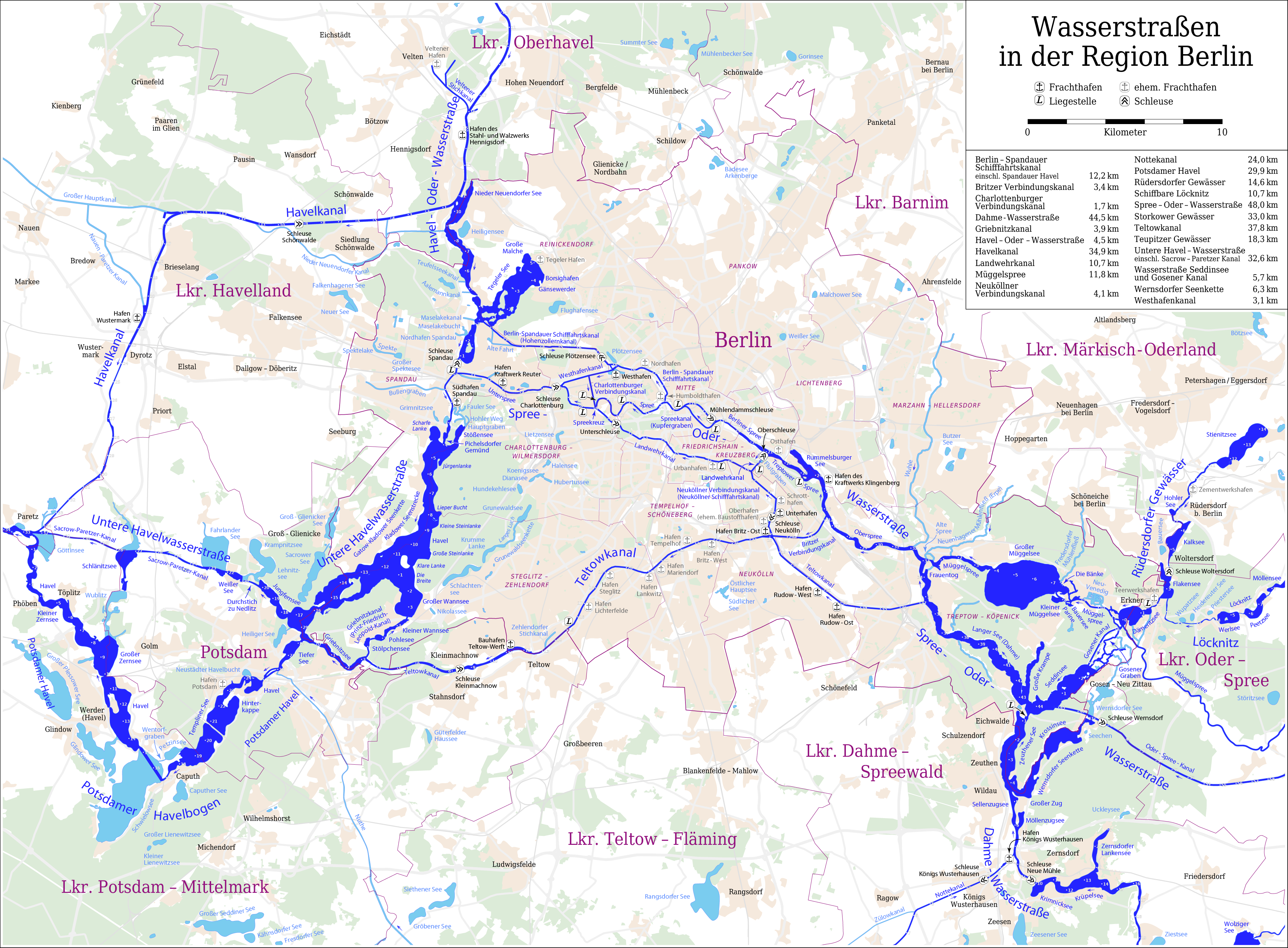
Map of waterways in the Berlin region, with the Teltow Canal slightly below the centre

The Britz Canal, or Britzer Verbindungskanal in German, is a 3.4-kilometre (2.1 mi) long canal in Berlin, Germany. The canal was built between 1900 and 1906, and was previously known as the Britz Branch Canal or Britzer Zweigkanal.

The canal provides a shortcut for shipping from the Teltow Canal and Neukölln Ship Canal directly to the Spree River, as well as serving several inner city ports. It has no locks.
