= Neukölln Ship Canal =

Canal in Berlin, Germany

Coordinates: 52°28′39″N 13°27′29″E

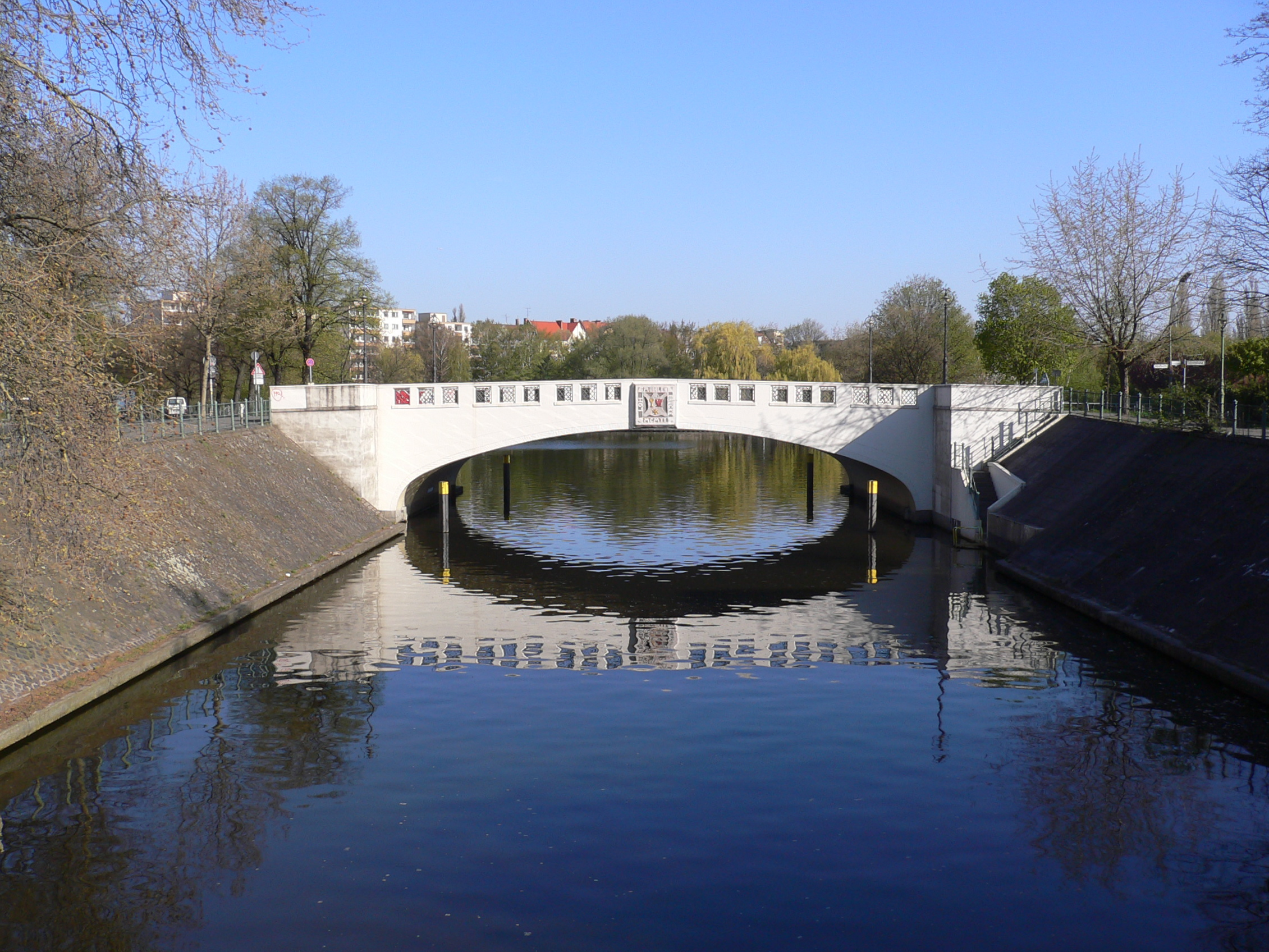
- The Lohmuehlenbruecke across the Neukölln Ship Canal
- Interactive map of Neukölln Ship Canal

Specifications
- Length: 4.1 km (2.5 miles)

Geography
- Start point: Landwehr Canal
- End point: Teltow Canal and the Britz Canal

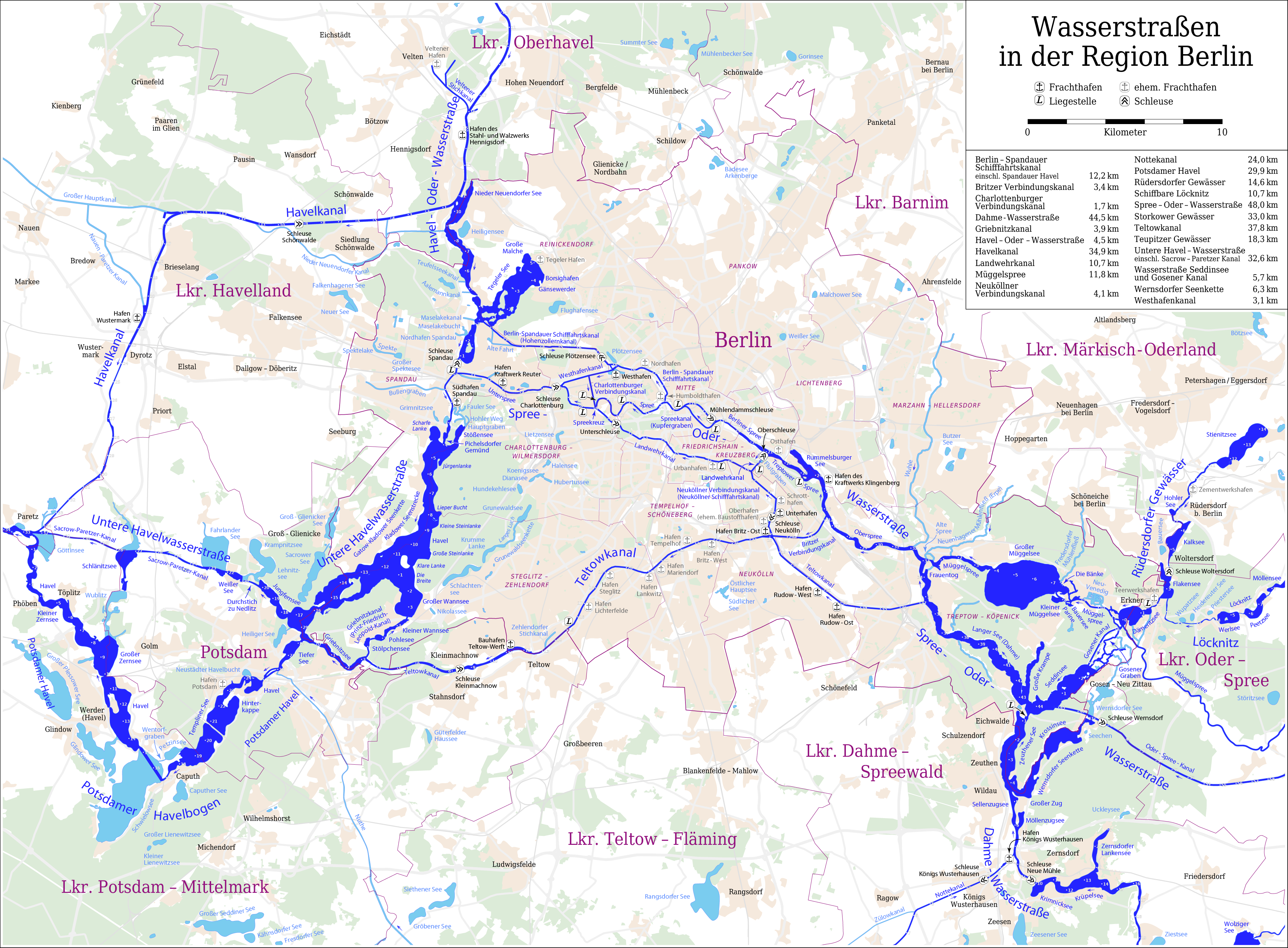
Map of waterways in the Berlin region

The Neukölln Ship Canal, or Neuköllner Schiffahrtskanal, is a 4.1-kilometre (2.5 mi) long canal in Berlin, Germany. It connects with the Landwehr Canal at its northern end, and with the Teltow Canal and the Britz Canal at its southern end.

The canal has a single lock, the Schleuse Neukölln, towards its southern end. The lock rises from the level of the Landwehr Canal to that of the Teltow and Britz canals.
