= Zeuthen =

- Municipality
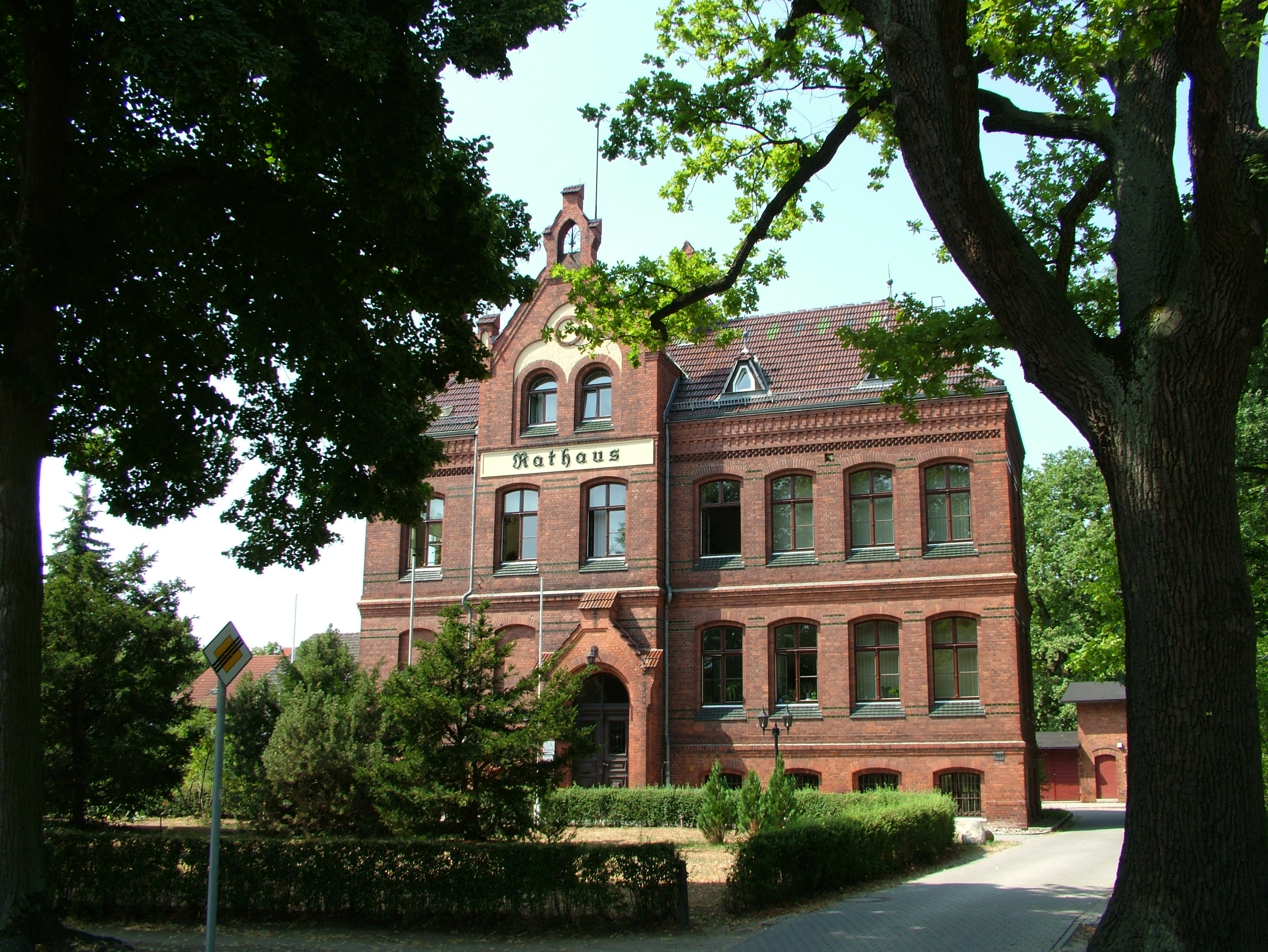
- Town hall

- Coat of arms

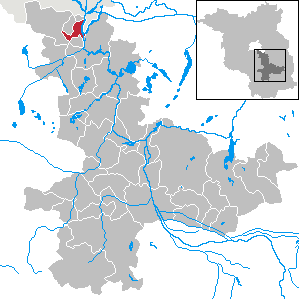
- Location of Zeuthen within Dahme-Spreewald district
- Interactive map of Zeuthen
- Location within Germany Location within Brandenburg
- Coordinates: 52°21′00″N 13°37′41″E
- Country: Germany
- State: Brandenburg
- District: Dahme-Spreewald

Government
  - Mayor (2024–32): Philipp Martens (Ind.)

Area
  - Total: 12.68 km^{2} (4.90 sq mi)
- Elevation: 34 m (112 ft)

Population (2025-12-31)
  - Total: 11,330
  - Density: 893.5/km^{2} (2,314/sq mi)
- Time zone: UTC+01:00 (CET)
  - Summer (DST): UTC+02:00 (CEST)
- Postal codes: 15738
- Dialling codes: 033762
- Vehicle registration: LDS
- Website: www.zeuthen.de

Zeuthen (German pronunciation: [ˈtsɔʏtn̩]) is a municipality in the district of Dahme-Spreewald in Brandenburg in Germany.

== Geography ==
It is located near the southeastern Berlin city limits on the western shore of the Dahme River and the Zeuthener See. It borders Eichwalde in the north, Schulzendorf and Schönefeld in the west, Wildau and Königs Wusterhausen in the south, as well as the Berlin borough of Treptow-Köpenick (Schmöckwitz locality) on the eastern shore of Zeuthener See, where the municipal area also includes the Miersdorfer Werder exclave. The four municipalities of Zeuthen, Eichwalde, Wildau and Schulzendorf form a coherently built-up suburban area.

Zeuthen railway station is a stop on the Berlin-Görlitz line, it is served by the Berlin S-Bahn.

== History ==
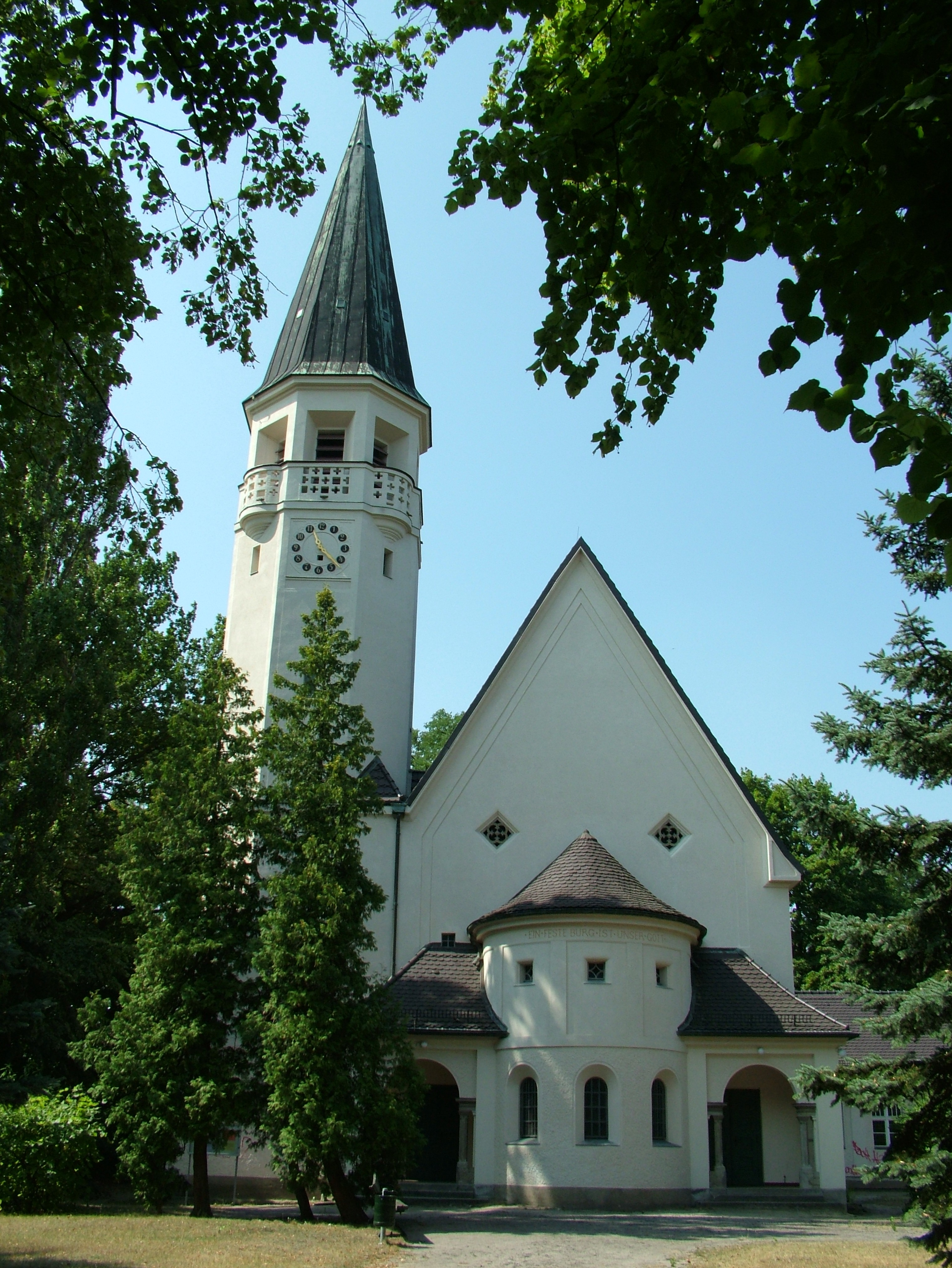
Martin Luther Church

Probably of Slavic origin like many Brandenburg settlements, Zeuthen with neighbouring Miersdorf and Gersdorf was first mentioned in the 1375 Landbuch (domesday book) written at the behest of the Luxembourg emperor Charles IV, who had acquired the margraviate from the Bavarian House of Wittelsbach two years before.

Devastated in the Thirty Years' War and with a population of only 122 still in 1860, the rapid development of the former village on the riverside to a coveted suburban residential area began with the building of the railway line to Görlitz shortly afterwards and the rise of Berlin as capital of the German Empire in 1871. Zeuthen station was inaugurated on 1 November 1897. Neighbouring Miersdorf was merged into the Zeuthen municipality in 1957.

In World War II, the German Reichspostministerium research department under Wilhelm Ohnesorge had begun to build up a cyclotron particle accelerator and an isotope separator at Zeuthen, which from 1962 formed the nucleus of the East German Institute for High Energy Physics (IfH), part of the Academy of Sciences of the GDR. Following German reunification, the premises were merged as the second site of the DESY institute on 1 January 1992.

== Demography ==
Development of Population since 1875 within the Current Boundaries (Blue Line: Population; Dotted Line: Comparison to Population Development of Brandenburg state; Grey Background: Time of Nazi rule; Red Background: Time of Communist rule)

Recent Population Development and Projections (Population Development before Census 2011 (blue line); Recent Population Development according to the Census in Germany in 2011 (blue bordered line); Official projections for 2005-2030 (yellow line); for 2020-2030 (green line); for 2017-2030 (scarlet line)

Zeuthen: Population development
within the current boundaries (2017)

Year	Pop.	±% p.a.
1875	372	—
1890	590	+3.12%
1910	1,553	+4.96%
1925	2,620	+3.55%
1933	5,249	+9.07%
1939	8,358	+8.06%
1946	8,730	+0.62%
1950	9,624	+2.47%
1964	9,078	−0.42%
1971	9,121	+0.07%
1981	8,610	−0.57%
1985	8,236	−1.10%
1989	7,979	−0.79%
1990	7,860	−1.49%
1991	7,738	−1.55%

Year	Pop.	±% p.a.
1992	7,696	−0.54%
1993	7,652	−0.57%
1994	7,794	+1.86%
1995	7,923	+1.66%
1996	8,056	+1.68%
1997	8,171	+1.43%
1998	8,665	+6.05%
1999	9,005	+3.92%
2000	9,375	+4.11%
2001	9,646	+2.89%
2002	9,831	+1.92%
2003	9,959	+1.30%
2004	10,094	+1.36%
2005	10,219	+1.24%
2006	10,377	+1.55%

Year	Pop.	±% p.a.
2007	10,344	−0.32%
2008	10,272	−0.70%
2009	10,290	+0.18%
2010	10,400	+1.07%
2011	10,574	+1.67%
2012	10,693	+1.13%
2013	10,811	+1.10%
2014	10,993	+1.68%
2015	11,106	+1.03%
2016	11,270	+1.48%
2017	11,297	+0.24%
2018	11,381	+0.74%
2019	11,427	+0.40%
2020	11,355	−0.63%

== Politics ==
=== Seats in the municipal assembly ===
As of the 2008 elections.

- Bürger für Zeuthen (Free Voters): 6
- Social Democratic Party of Germany (SPD): 6
- The Left: 4
- Christian Democratic Union (CDU): 4
- Alliance '90/The Greens: 1
- Free Democratic Party (FDP): 1

=== Mayor ===
On September 24, 2017 Sven Herzberger (no party affiliation) won the election for an eight-year term with 62.9% of the valid votes cast.

Past Mayors

- 1990–1994 Karl-Ludwig Böttcher (SPD)
- 1994–2010 Klaus-Dieter Kubick (No party affiliation)
- 2010–2018 Beate Burgschweiger (SPD)
- 2018–2024 Sven Herzberger (No party affiliation)
- since 2024 Philipp Martens (No party affiliation)

=== International relations ===
Zeuthen is twinned with:

- Małomice, Poland
- Interlaken, Switzerland
- Düren, Germany
