= Langer See =

- Location within Germany
- Location: Germany
- Coordinates: 52.40522°N 13.627102°E
- Type: lake
- Max. length: 11 kilometres (6.8 mi)
- Surface area: 2.43 square kilometres (0.94 sq mi)

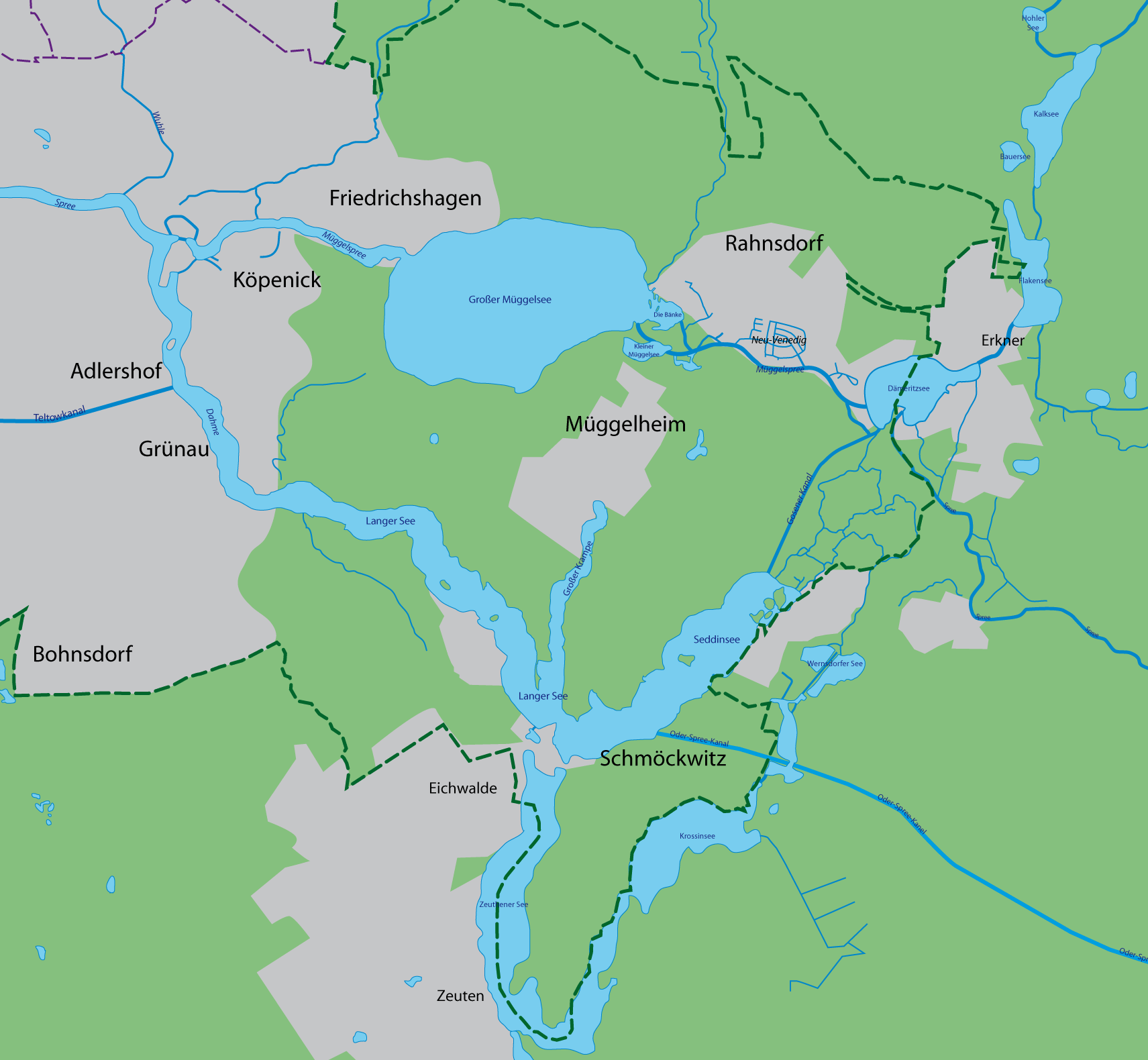
Map of the waterways of south-east Berlin, with the Langer See centre-left

The Langer See is a lake situated in the south-eastern outskirts of Berlin, the capital city of Germany. The lake is aligned south-east to north-west and forms part of the course of the River Dahme. The Langer See is approximately 11 kilometres (6.8 mi) long, with an average width of 221 metres (725 ft) and an area of 2.43 square kilometres (0.94 sq mi).

The Dahme flows into the Langer See from the Zeuthener See, at the south-east end of the lake by the Berlin suburb of Schmöckwitz. It flows out to the north-west near Köpenick and its confluence with the River Spree. At Schmöckwitz the Langer See also mingles with the Seddinsee.

Like the River Dahme, the Langer See is navigable. Besides traffic to the upstream reaches of the Dahme, the lake also carries traffic to the Oder-Spree Canal, which links with the Seddinsee and provides a commercial waterway link between Berlin and Poland.

The Langer See is crossed by two of Berlin's passenger ferries that are operated by the BVG, the municipal transport operator. The F12 crosses from Müggelbergallee (in Köpenick) to Wassersportallee (in Grünau), and operates all year. The F21 crosses from Krampenburg via Große Krampe (both in Müggelheim) to Zum Seeblick (in Schmöckwitz), and operates only in summer.

The regatta course on the Langer See at Grünau was used for the Olympic canoeing and rowing events at the 1936 Summer Olympics.

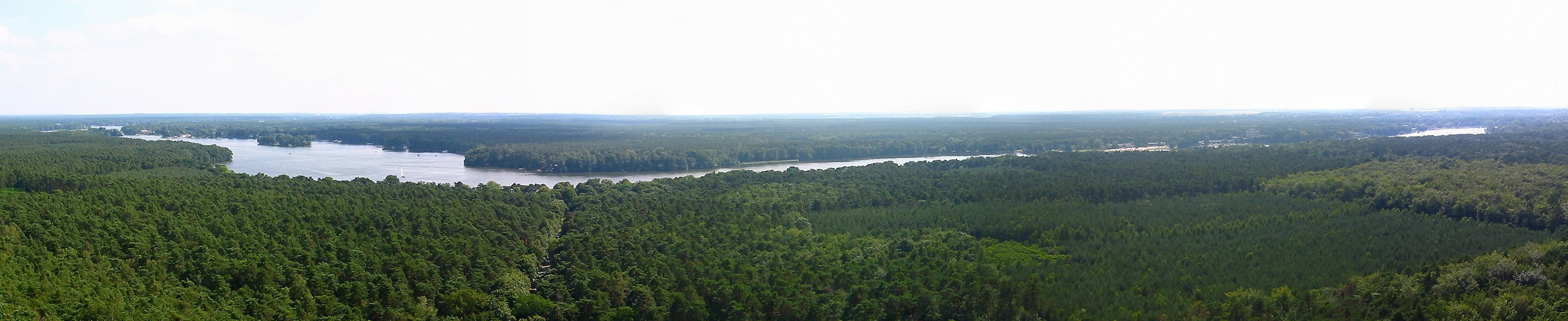
Panorama of the Langer See looking south from the Müggelturm
