= Müggelheim =

- Quarter of Berlin
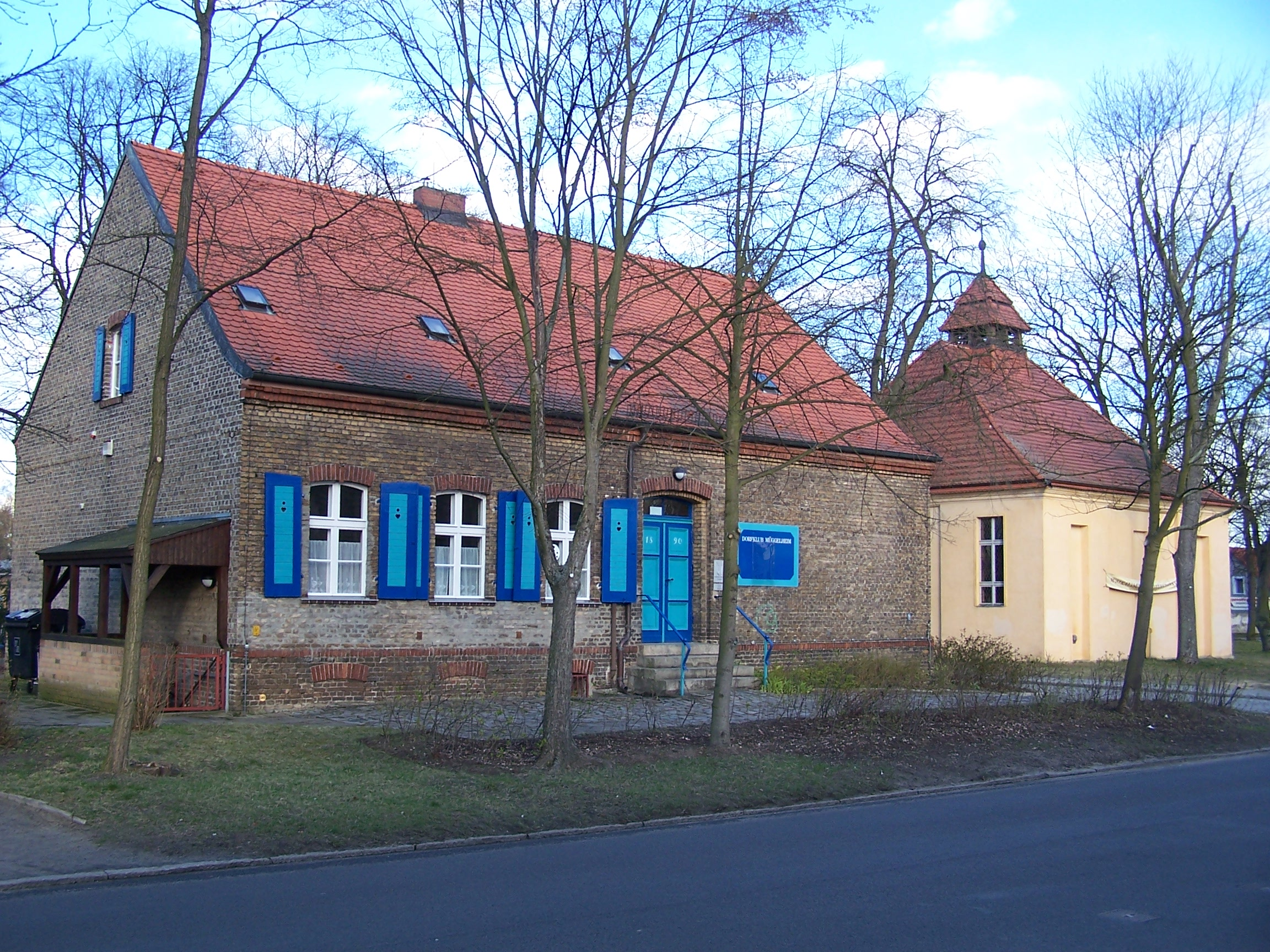
- Old school and village church

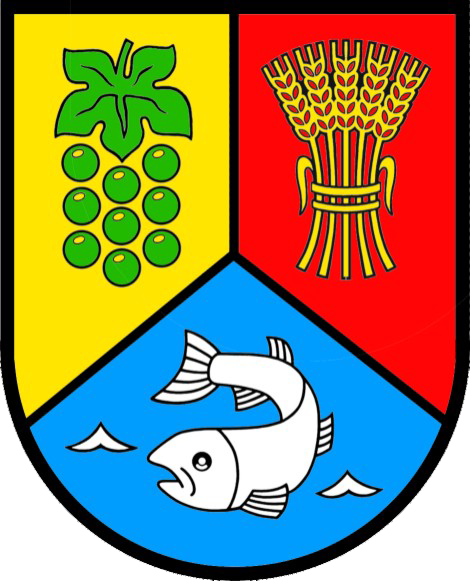
- Coat of arms

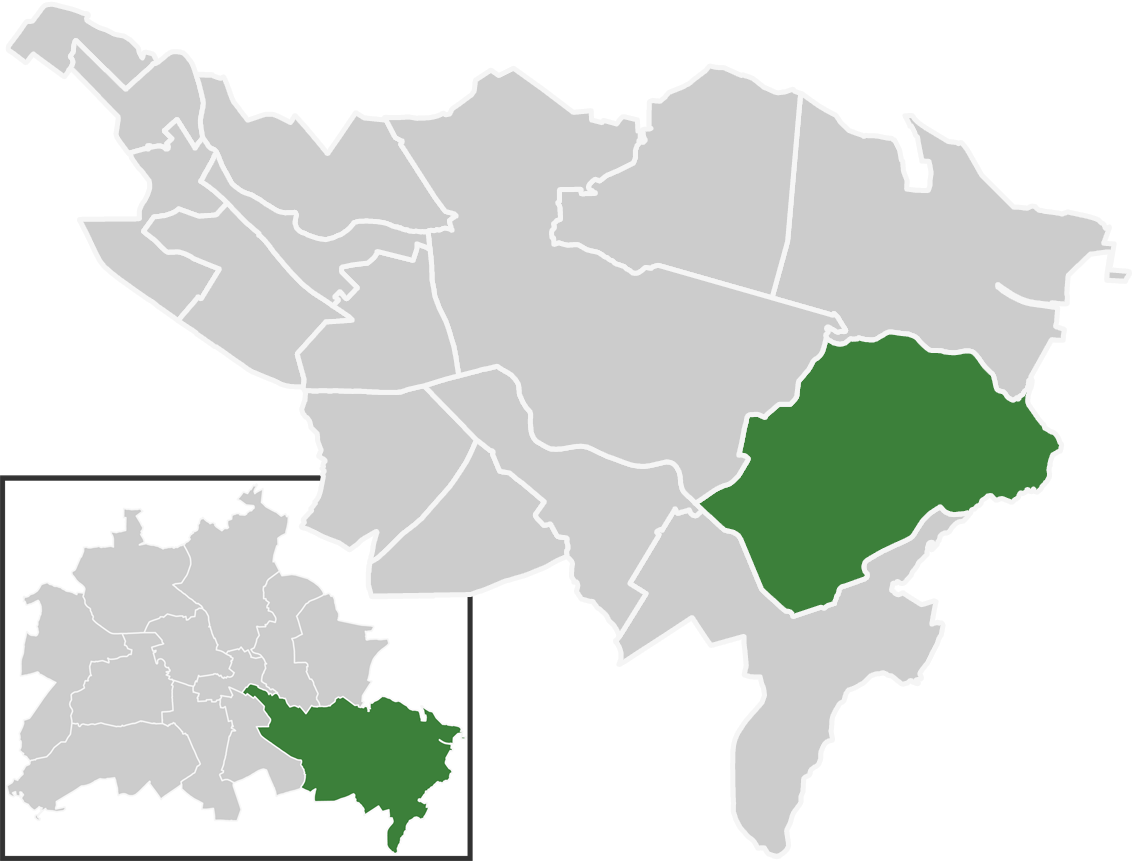
- Location of Müggelheim in Treptow-Köpenick and Berlin
- Interactive map of Müggelheim
- Location within Germany Location within Berlin
- Coordinates: 52°24′00″N 13°39′00″E
- Country: Germany
- State: Berlin
- City: Berlin
- Borough: Treptow-Köpenick
- Founded: 1747
- Subdivisions: 3 zones

Area
  - Total: 22.2 km^{2} (8.6 sq mi)
- Elevation: 34 m (112 ft)

Population (2024-12-31)
  - Total: 7,059
  - Density: 318/km^{2} (824/sq mi)
- Time zone: UTC+01:00 (CET)
  - Summer (DST): UTC+02:00 (CEST)
- Postal codes: 12559
- Vehicle registration: B
- Website: Official website

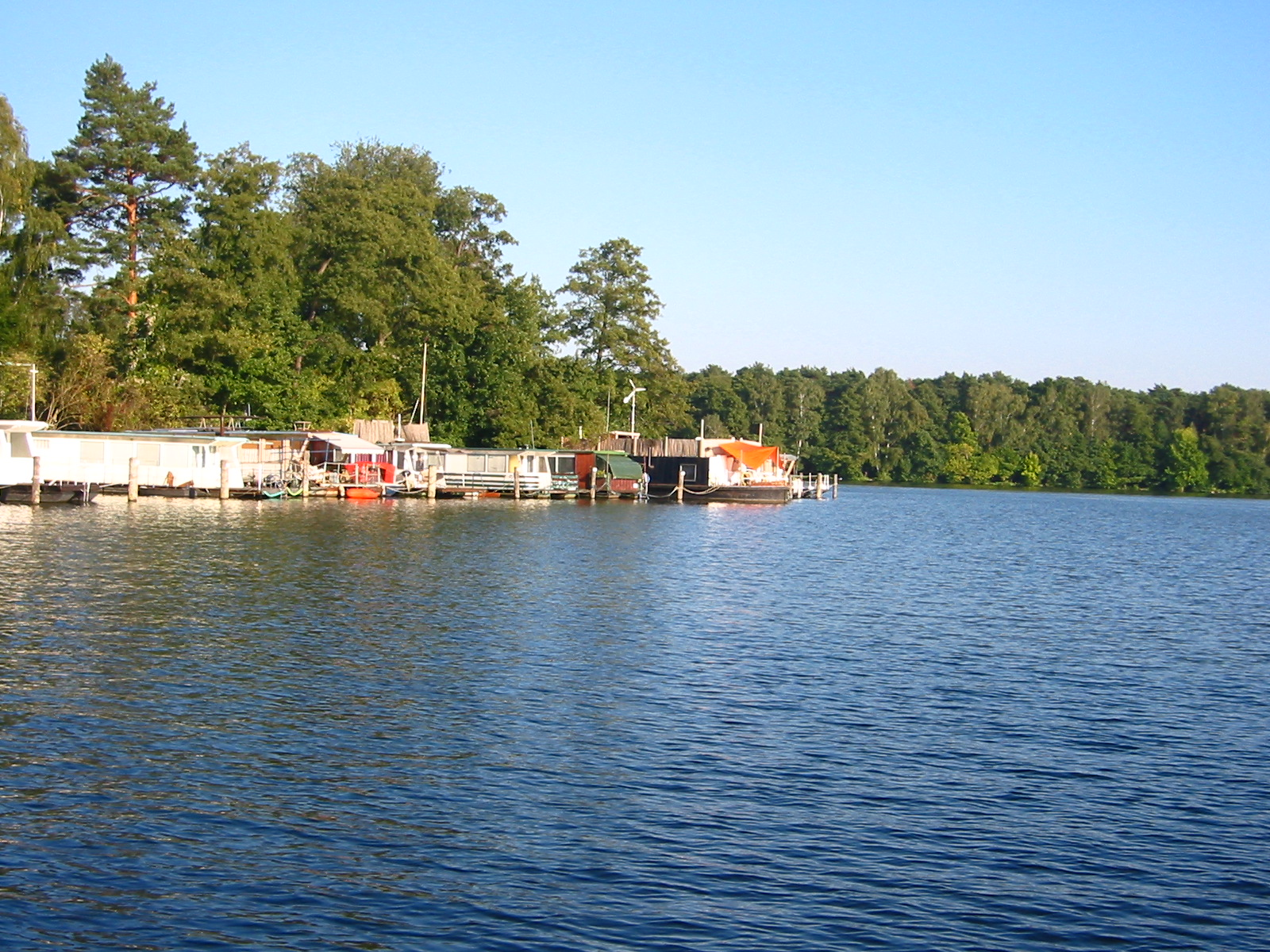
The Große Krampe at Krampenburg

Müggelheim (German pronunciation: [ˈmʏɡl̩ˌhaɪ̯m]) is a German locality (Ortsteil) within the Berlin borough (Bezirk) of Treptow-Köpenick. Until 2001 it was part of the former borough of Köpenick.

== History ==
The village was founded on June 1, 1747, by 20 families from Odernheim am Glan, in Rhineland-Palatinate. By 1920 it was still an autonomous municipality, the lesser populated one (186 inhabitants) merging into the German capital with the "Greater Berlin Act".

== Geography ==
=== Overview ===
Müggelheim, surrounded by the Berliner Stadtforst, lies in the southeastern suburbs of Berlin, at the borders with the Brandenburg municipalities of Erkner and Gosen-Neu Zittau, Oder-Spree district. It borders on the Berlin localities of Rahnsdorf, Köpenick, Grünau and Schmöckwitz.

The lakes Seddinsee and Langer See are the southern borders of the locality, which has within its limits three other lakes, the Große Krampe, a little portion of the Müggelsee (named Kleiner Müggelsee), and the little Bauersee.

=== Subdivision ===
Müggelheim has three zones (Ortslagen):

- Krampenburg
- Ludwigshöhe
- Siedlung Schönhorst

== Transport ==
The locality has no urban rail service: the nearest S-Bahn station is Wilhelmshagen, located in Rahnsdorf. It is served by the bus routes M69 and 369, and by the ferry routes F21 (from Krampenburg to Schmöckwitz), F23 (from Müggelwerderweg to Kruggasse, in Rahnsdorf) and F24 (from Spreewiesen to Kruggasse).

== Photogallery ==
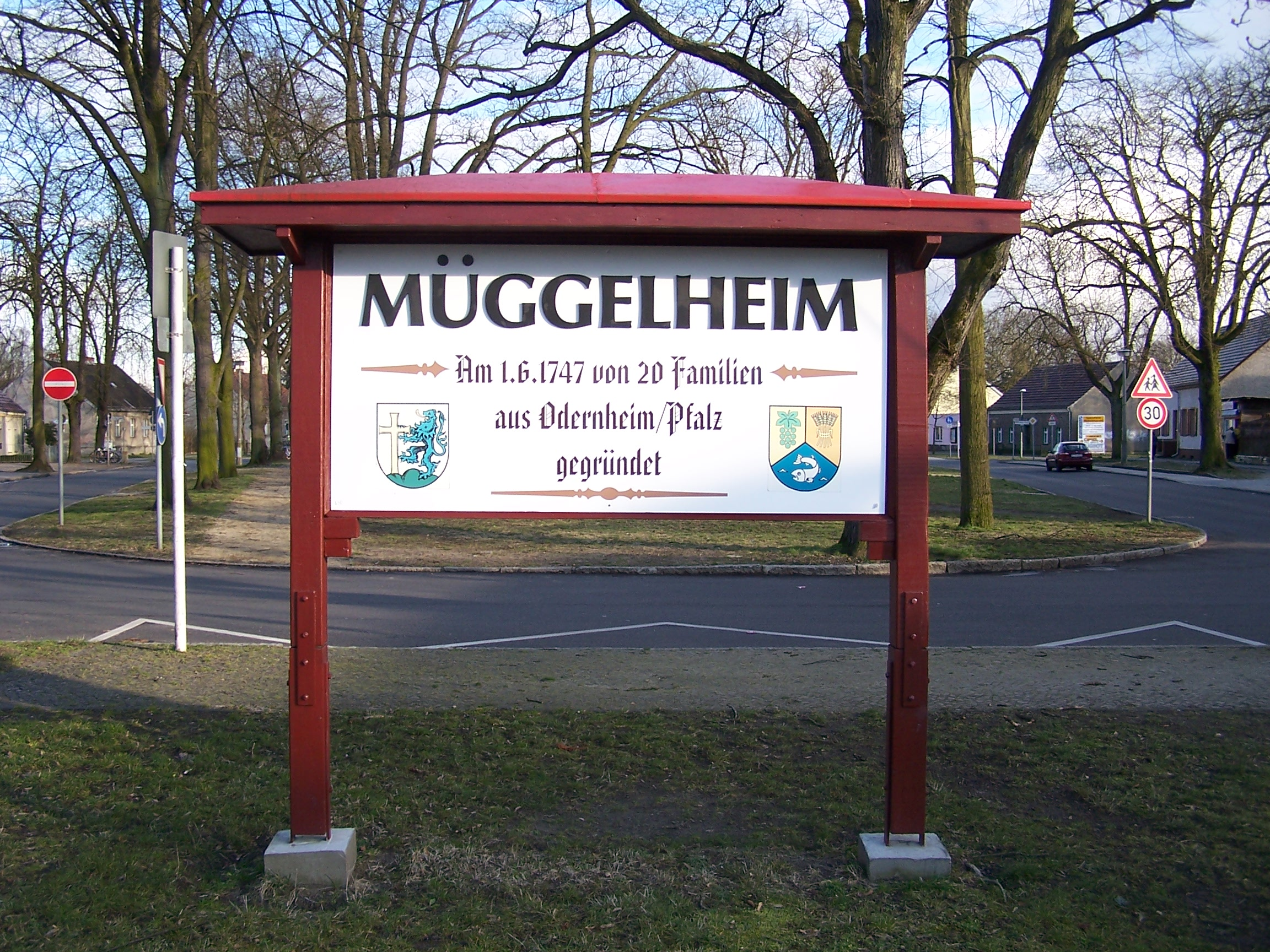
Welcome sign of the locality

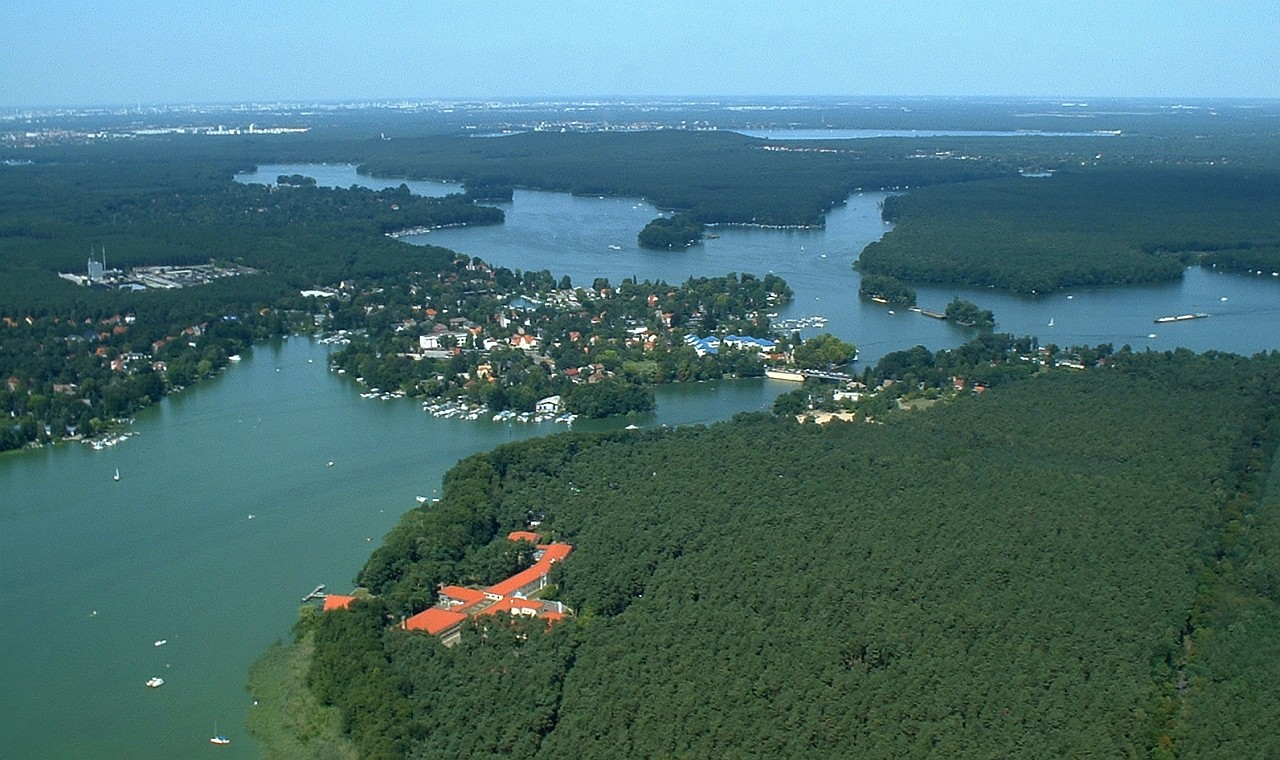
Seddinsee with the village of Schmöckwitz. In the north is the Große Krampe with Krampenburg and the Berliner Stadtforst.

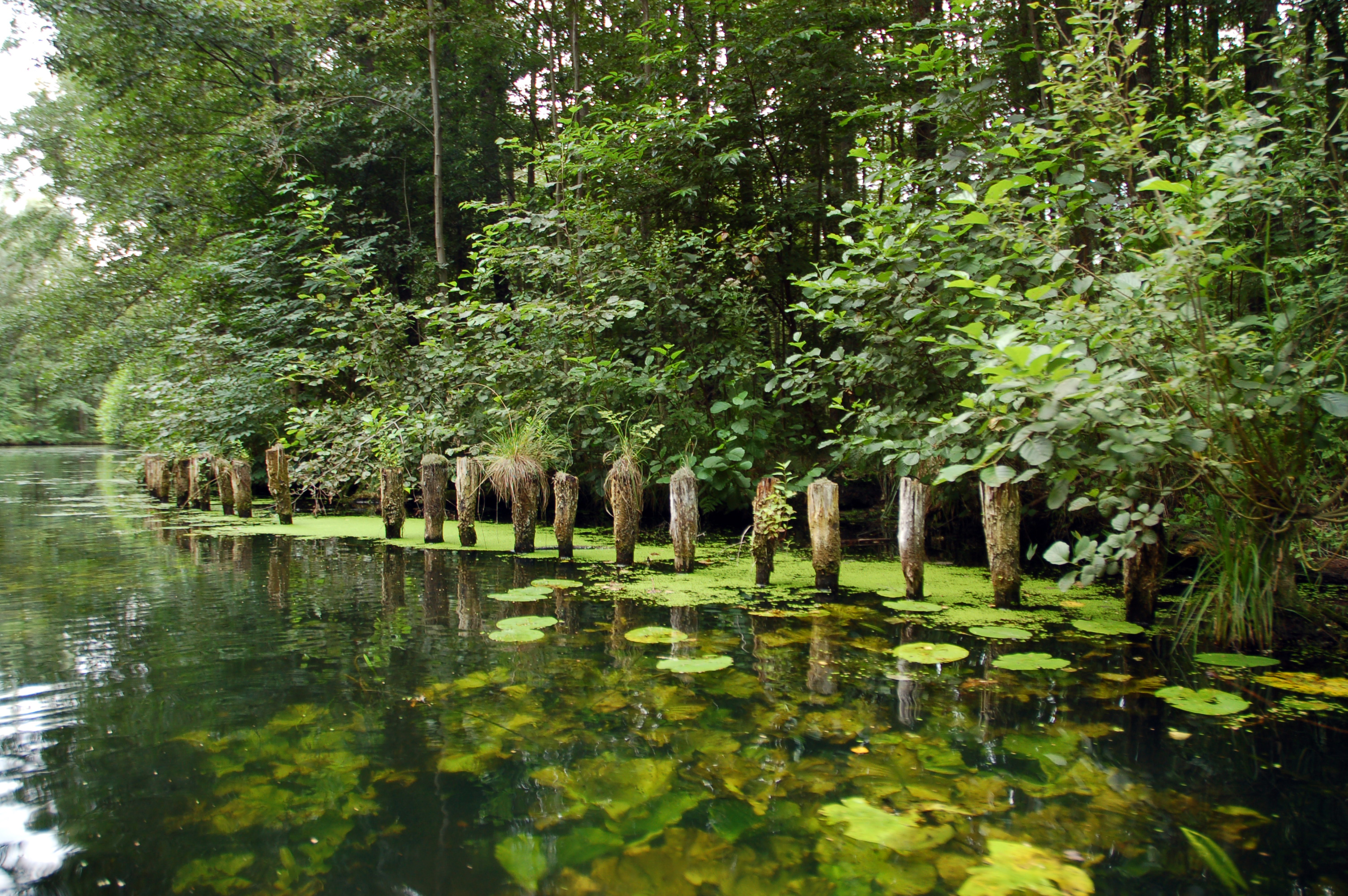
View of the Gosen Canal
