= Schmöckwitz =

- Quarter of Berlin
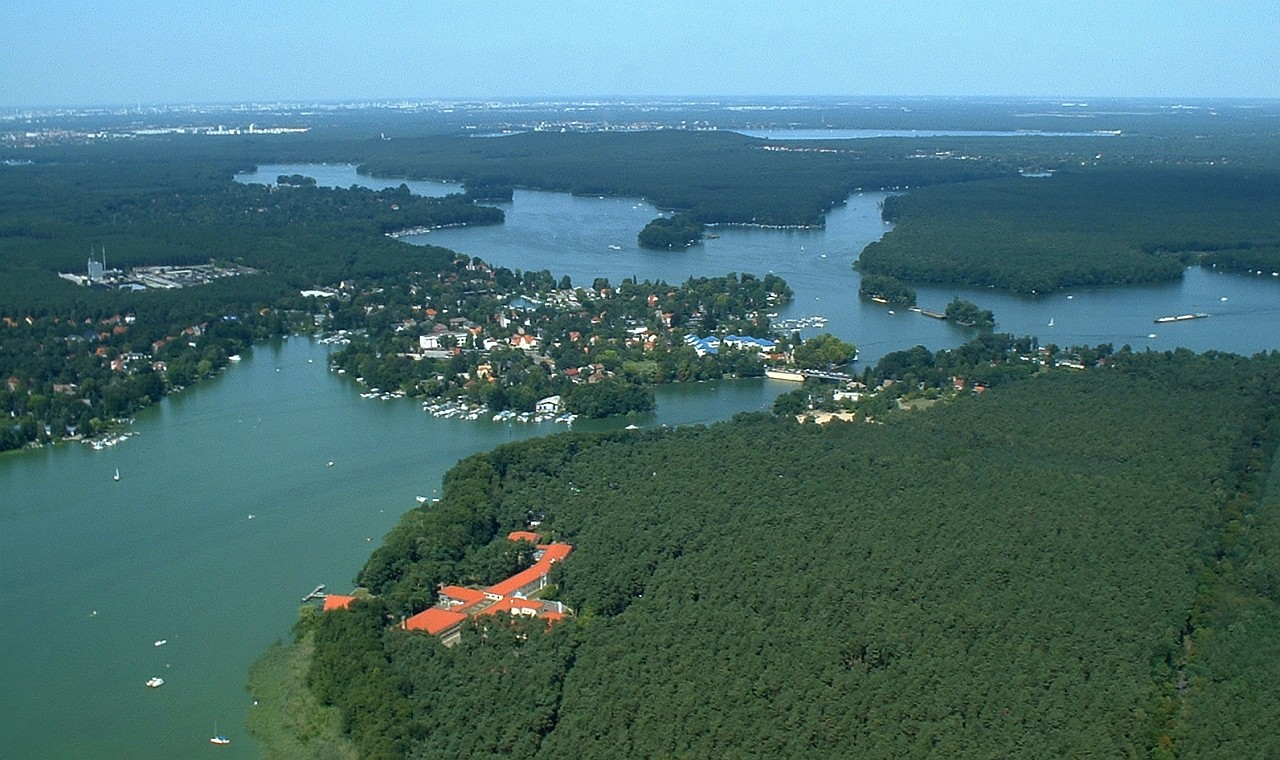
- Aerial view of Schmöckwitz, between the lakes Seddinsee (west), Langer See (east) and Zeuthener See (south). In the north, Larger Krampe lake (Müggelheim)

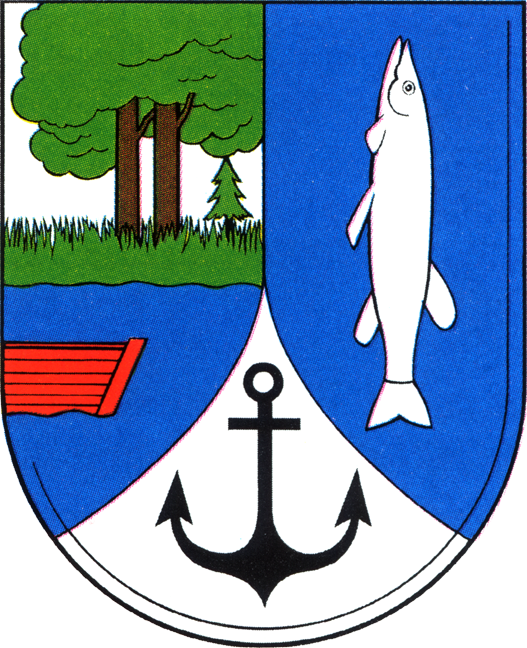
- Coat of arms

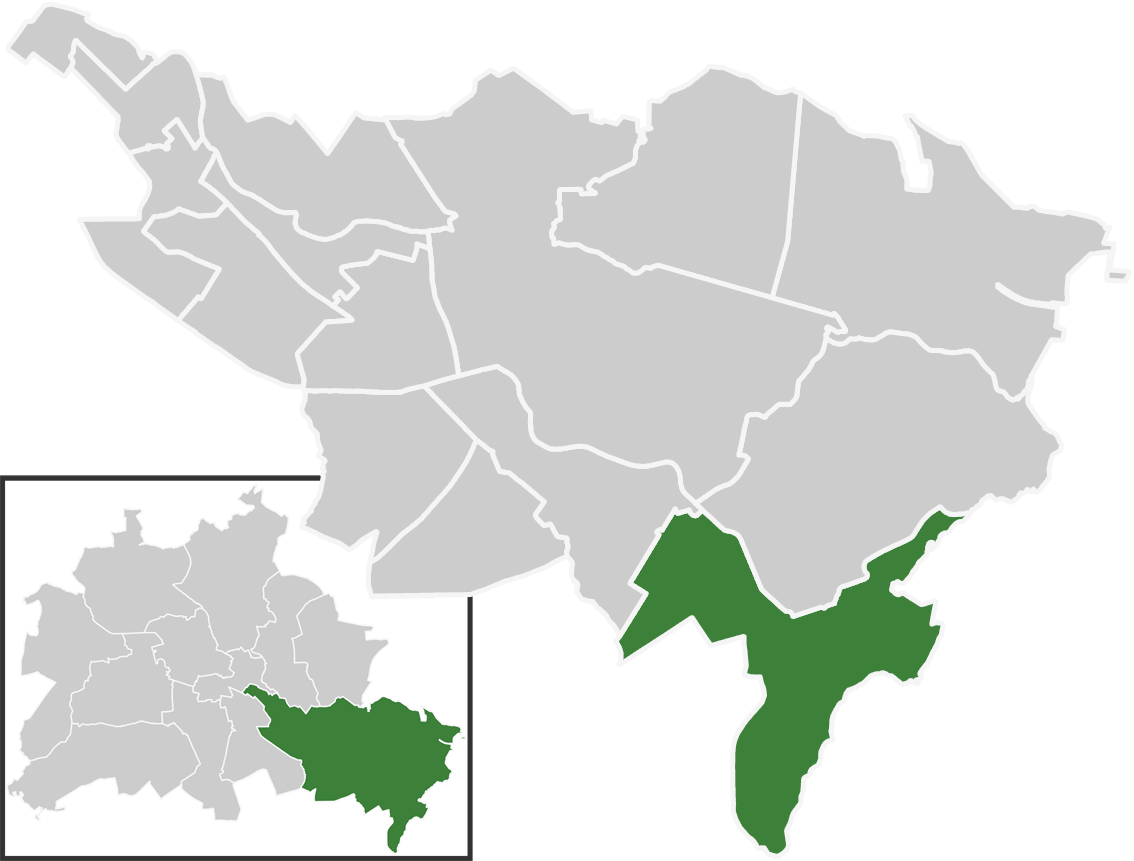
- Location of Schmöckwitz in Treptow-Köpenick and Berlin
- Interactive map of Schmöckwitz
- Location within Germany Location within Berlin
- Coordinates: 52°22′00″N 13°38′00″E
- Country: Germany
- State: Berlin
- City: Berlin
- Borough: Treptow-Köpenick
- Founded: 1375
- Subdivisions: 4 zones

Area
  - Total: 17.1 km^{2} (6.6 sq mi)
- Elevation: 34 m (112 ft)

Population (2024-12-31)
  - Total: 4,487
  - Density: 262/km^{2} (680/sq mi)
- Time zone: UTC+01:00 (CET)
  - Summer (DST): UTC+02:00 (CEST)
- Postal codes: 12527
- Vehicle registration: B

Schmöckwitz (pronounced [ˈʃmœkvɪts]) is a German locality (Ortsteil) within the Berlin borough (Bezirk) of Treptow-Köpenick. Until 2001 it was part of the former borough of Köpenick.

== History ==
The locality was founded in 1375 with the name of Smekewitz. In 1920 it merged into the city of Berlin with the "Greater Berlin Act" and from 1949 to 1990 it was part of East Berlin

== Geography ==
=== Overview ===
Located in south-eastern suburb of the city, Schmöckwitz represents the southernmost locality of Berlin, with its southernmost point at Rauchfangswerder, a little peninsula between the lakes of Zeuthener See (on Dahme river) and Großer Zug which represents, also with the lakes Krossinsee and Lake Wernsdorf, the borders of Schmöckwitz with Brandenburg. The bordering municipalities are Gosen-Neu Zittau (in Oder-Spree district), Königs Wusterhausen (with the civil parishes of Wernsdorf and Ziegenhals), Eichwalde (also with Miersdorfer Werder) and Zeuthen; all of them in Dahme-Spreewald district. The bordering localities within Berlin are Müggelheim and Grünau. The first is separated by the lakes Seddinsee and Langer See (Long Lake), the second by a portion of the Berliner Stadtforst.

The zone of Schmöckwitzwerder is crossed by the Oder-Spree Canal. Some islets belong to the locality: Smaller Rohrwall is on Langer See; Werderchen, Weidenwall (both in front of the village), Seddinwall, Smaller Seddinwall, Nixenwall, Dommelwall and Berg on Seddinsee; Zeuthener Wall on Zeuthener See.

=== Subdivision ===
Schmöckwitz counts 4 zones (Ortslagen):

- Karolinenhof
- Rauchfangswerder
- Schmöckwitzwerder
- Siedlung Schmöckwitz

== Transport ==
The locality is crossed by the south-eastern branch of S-Bahn rail, by the lines S46 and S8, with the nearest station at Eichwalde, in Brandenburg. It is also served by the tram line 68, which ends in the middle of the village and passes through Karolinenhof. It is also served by the ferry line F21 (from Krampenburg to Seeblick). The bus lines serving the quarter are the 168 and 733.

== Photogallery ==
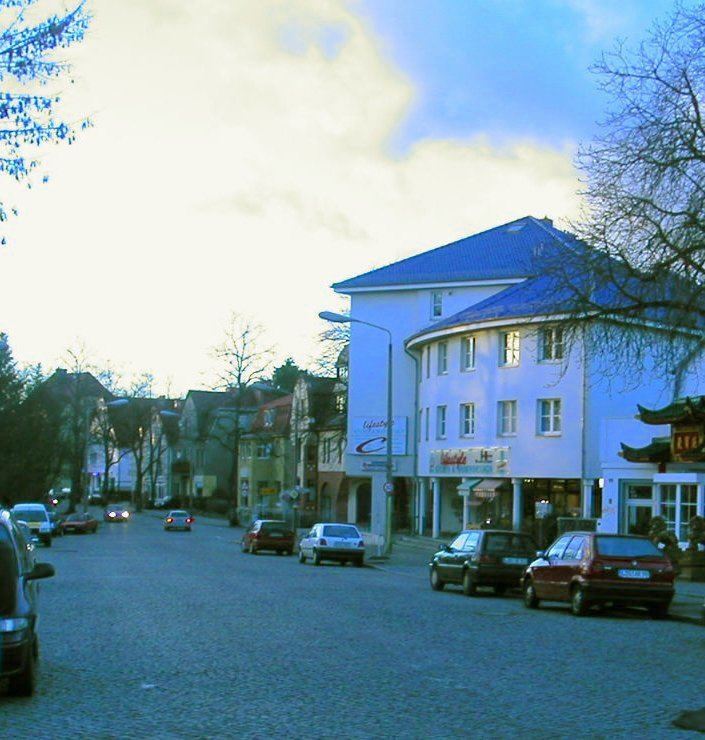
Village's entrance

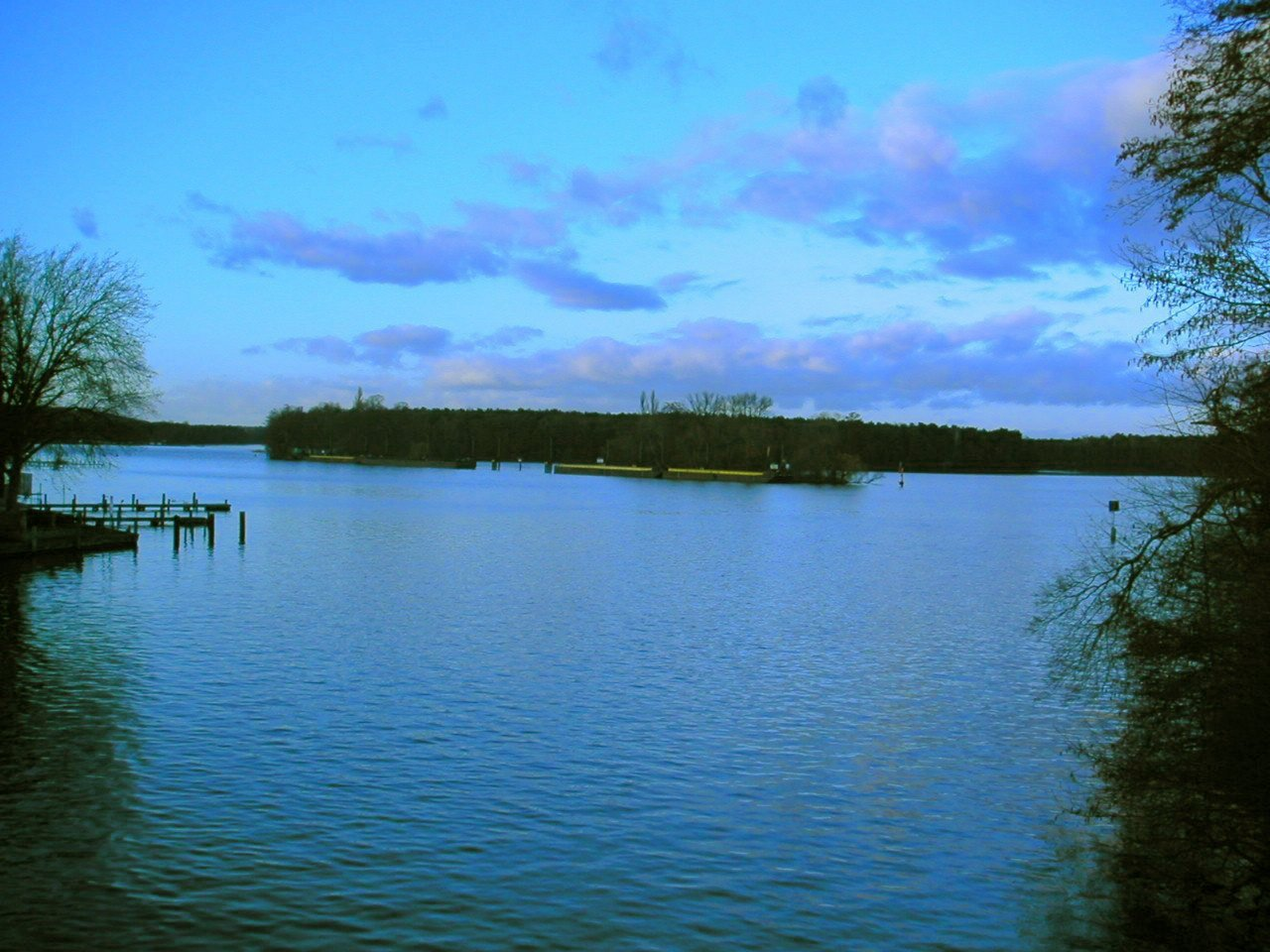
Seddinsee

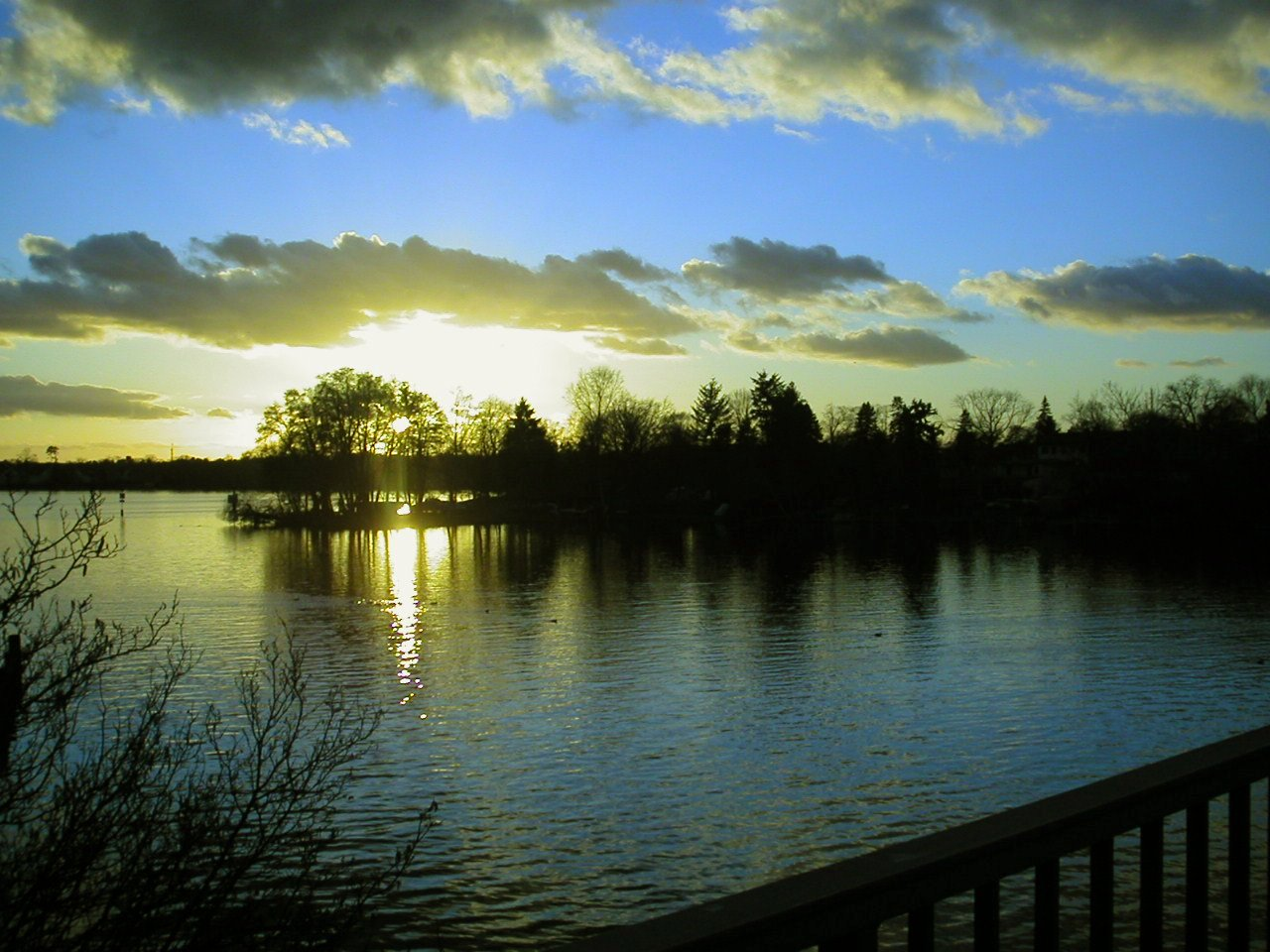
Zeuthener See

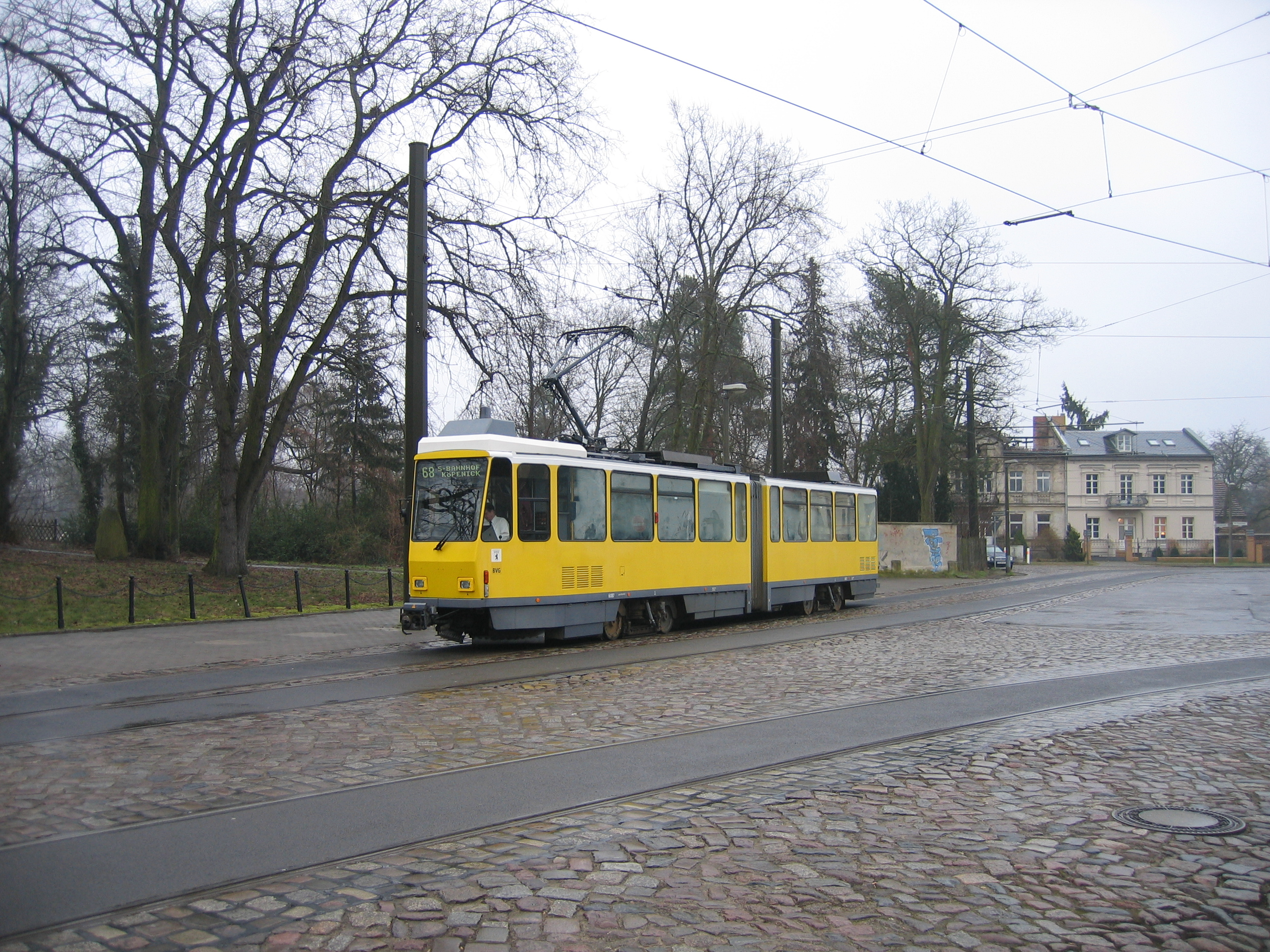
Tram 68 at the end station "Alt-Schmöckwitz"
