= Grünau (Berlin) =

- Quarter of Berlin
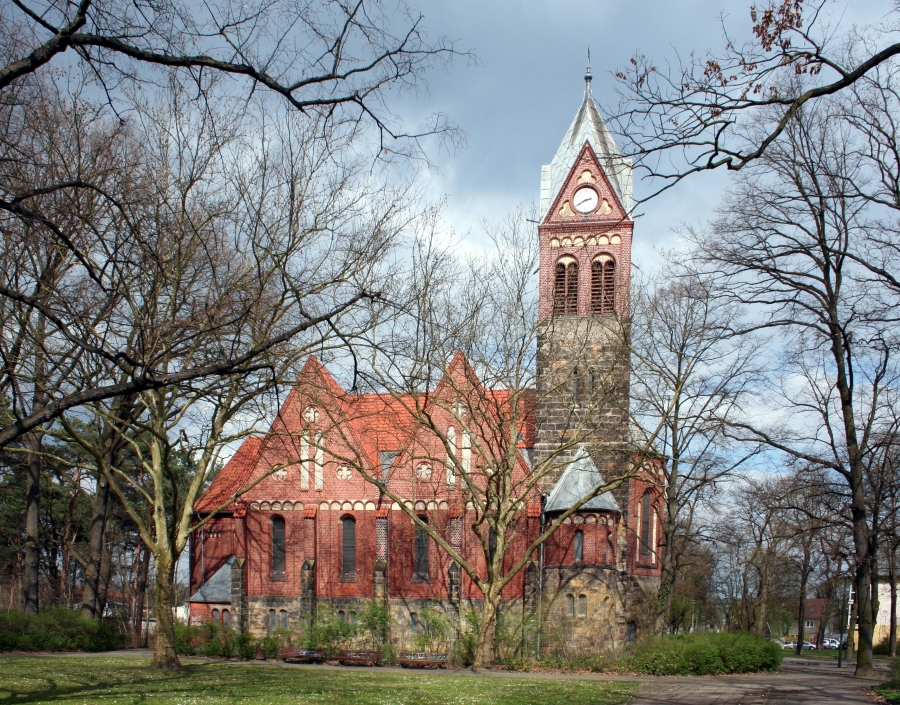
- Friedenskirche

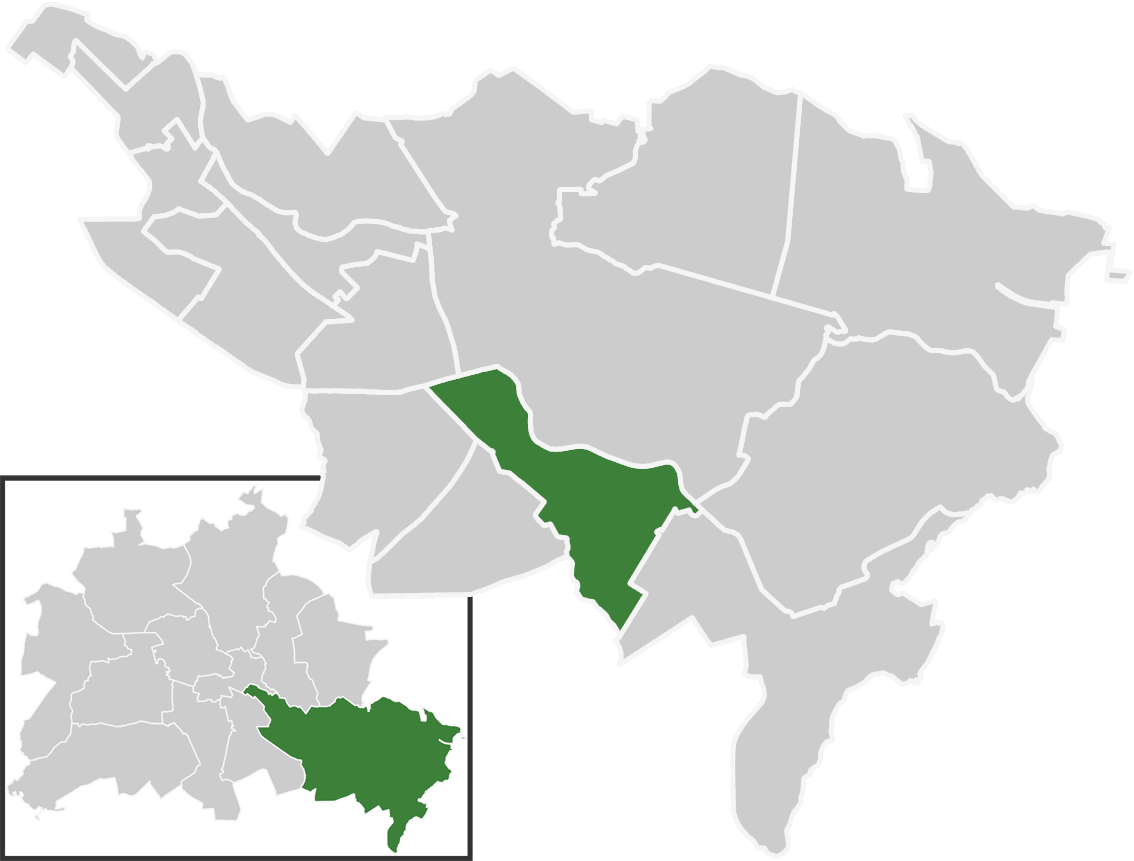
- Location of Grünau in Treptow-Köpenick and Berlin
- Interactive map of Grünau
- Location within Germany Location within Berlin
- Coordinates: 52°25′00″N 13°34′00″E
- Country: Germany
- State: Berlin
- City: Berlin
- Borough: Treptow-Köpenick
- Founded: 1749
- Subdivisions: 3 zones

Area
  - Total: 9.13 km^{2} (3.53 sq mi)
- Elevation: 34 m (112 ft)

Population (2024-12-31)
  - Total: 8,376
  - Density: 917/km^{2} (2,380/sq mi)
- Time zone: UTC+01:00 (CET)
  - Summer (DST): UTC+02:00 (CEST)
- Postal codes: 12527
- Vehicle registration: B

Grünau (German pronunciation: [ɡʁyːˈnaʊ]) is a German locality (Ortsteil) within the Berlin borough (Bezirk) of Treptow-Köpenick. Until 2001 it was part of the former borough of Köpenick.

== History ==
During 1747 and 1753 some settlements were founded by Frederick II of Prussia, as Müggelheim, Friedrichshagen and Grünau itself. The village, founded in 1749, was first mentioned in 1754 with the name of Grüne Aue. Until 1920 it was a Prussian municipality of the former district of Teltow, merged into Berlin with the "Greater Berlin Act". Grünau remained sparsely populated for a long time. As late as 1800, it had only 59 residents.

With the establishment of the Berlin–Görlitz rail in 1866, Berlin residents discovered the river side landscape as a local recreational area, not far away from the city. In 1874, a rail line connecting Grünau with Berlin began operating. In 1881, the first Berlin regatta club was founded. As water sports developed, the influx of day trippers grew, leading to the construction of numerous restaurants as well as clubs for rowing, sailing, and canoeing. Citizens of the Wilhelmine area also settled in Grünau and built villas and various country homes along the banks of the Dahme river, attracted by the Grünau’s advantageous location and low land prices. By 1900, Grünau had around 2 500 residents, with the total of 152 houses.

In 1928, electric S-Bahn service to Grünau begun.

For the 1936 Summer Olympics, the city hosted the canoeing and rowing events at the regatta course on the Langer See.

At the beginning of the 20th century, chemical factories also settled in Grünau, such as Landshoff & Meyer, which became a subsidiary of VEB Berlin-Chemie during the GDR era. These factories were closed by 1995 and later demolished.

== Geography ==
=== Overview ===
Located in the south-eastern suburb of Berlin, Grünau is bounded (in south-west) by the Brandenburger town of Schönefeld (in Dahme-Spreewald district). The Berliner bordering localities are Bohnsdorf, Altglienicke, Adlershof, Köpenick, Müggelheim and Schmöckwitz.

The quarter is surrounded by the Berliner Stadtforst and traversed by the river Dahme (tributary of the Spree) in the southern shore. In the lake Langer See, formed on the river, the islet of Großer Rohrwall belongs to Grünau.

=== Subdivisions ===
Grünau is divided into 3 zones (Ortslagen):

- An der Regattastrecke
- Grünau-Ost
- Grünau-West

== Demographics ==
As of December 31, 2023, 13.8% of the residents in Grünau were foreign nationals. The proportion of foreign nationals in Grünau is significantly lower than the figure for Berlin as a whole (24.4%) and slightly lower than that of the whole of Treptow-Köpenick (16.4%). Among all foreign nationals in Grünau, Ukrainians are the largest group, closely followed by Russians.

Year	Residents
1772	69
1801	59
1817	58
1840	127
1858	138
1871	288
1880	552
1890	1231
1895	1725

Year	Residents
1900	2485
1910	3004
1919	3550
1925	4131
1939	5383
1946	4634
1950	4556
1963	6573
1991	4769
1995	4443

Year	Residents
2000	5523
2007	5489
2010	5418
2015	5786
2020	7217
2021	7480
2022	8019
2023	8273
2024	8376
2025	8551

== Transport ==
As urban rail, the locality is served by the S-Bahn lines S46, S8 and S85 (at the homonymous railway station); and by the tramway line 68. To cross the river Dahme, it is served by the BVG ferry line F12 in Wassersportallee, that links Grünau to Köpenick.

== Personalities ==
- Karl Dönitz (1891–1980), admiral and politician, last president of Nazi Germany
- Stefan Heym (1913–2001), writer. He lived several years in a villa in Grünau.
- Walter Benjamin (1892–1940), writer and philosopher. He lived in a villa designed by Bruno Taut.

== Photogallery ==
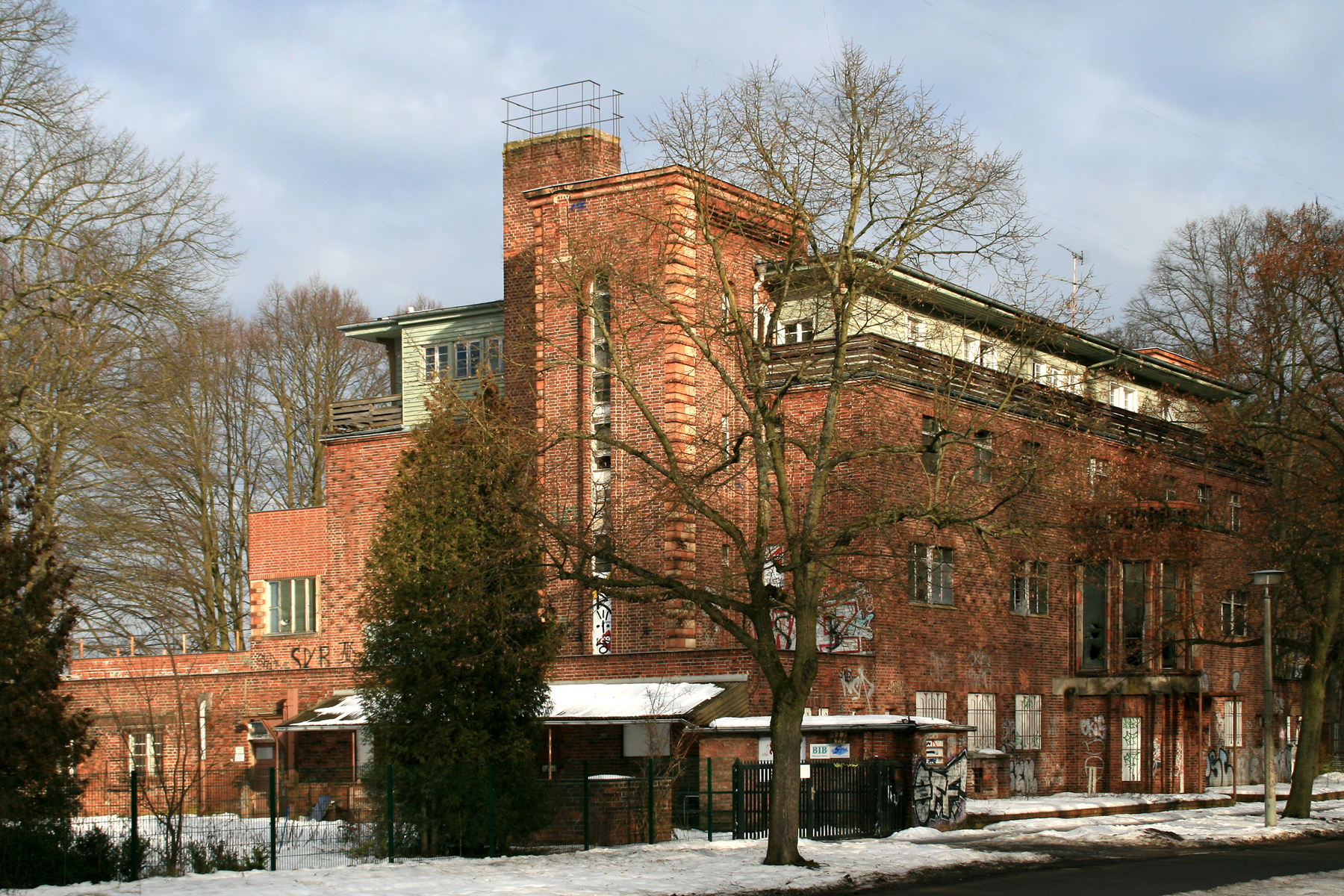
The former "Funkhaus Grünau"

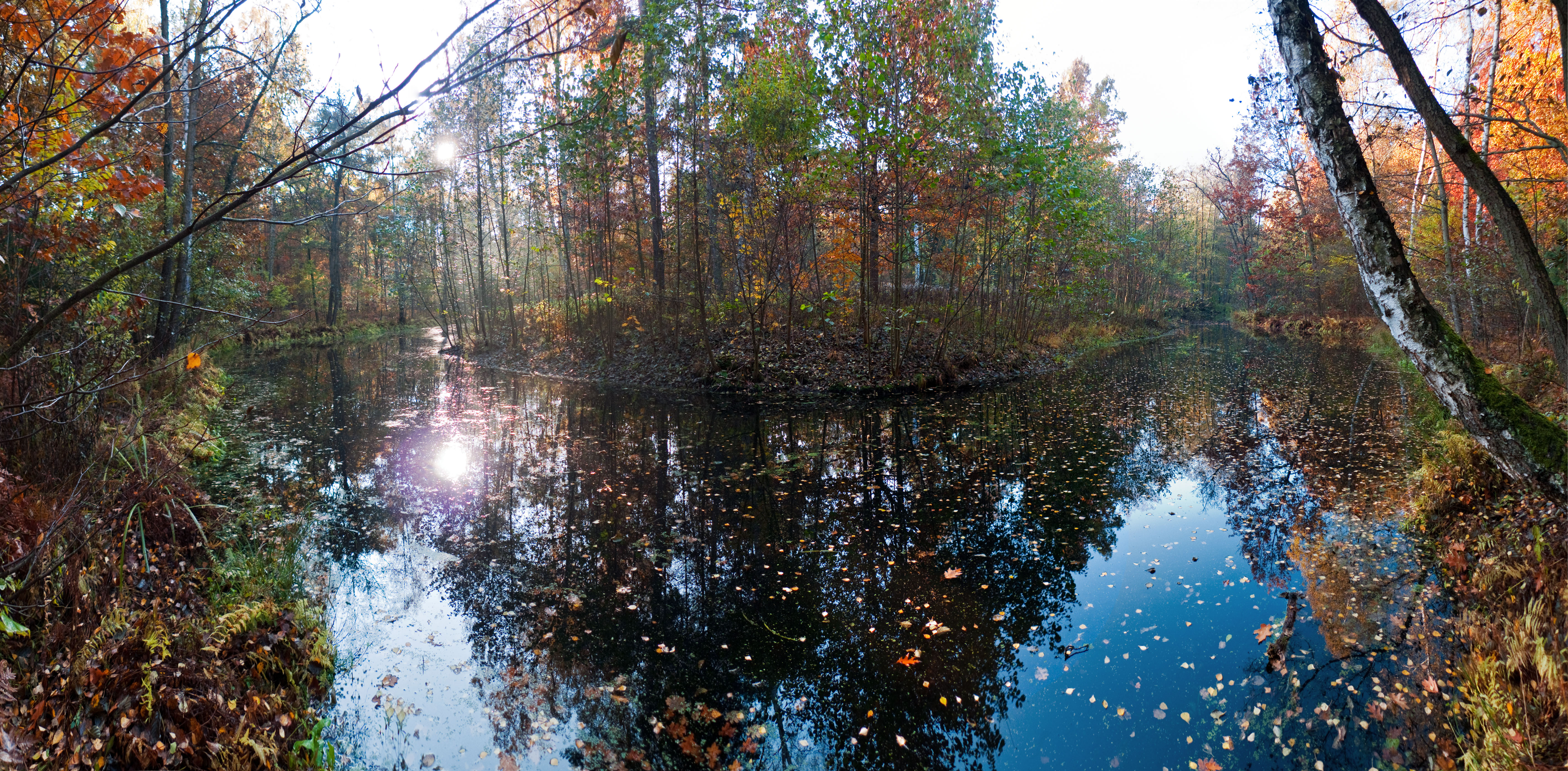
Protected landscape "Krumme Lake" in Grünau

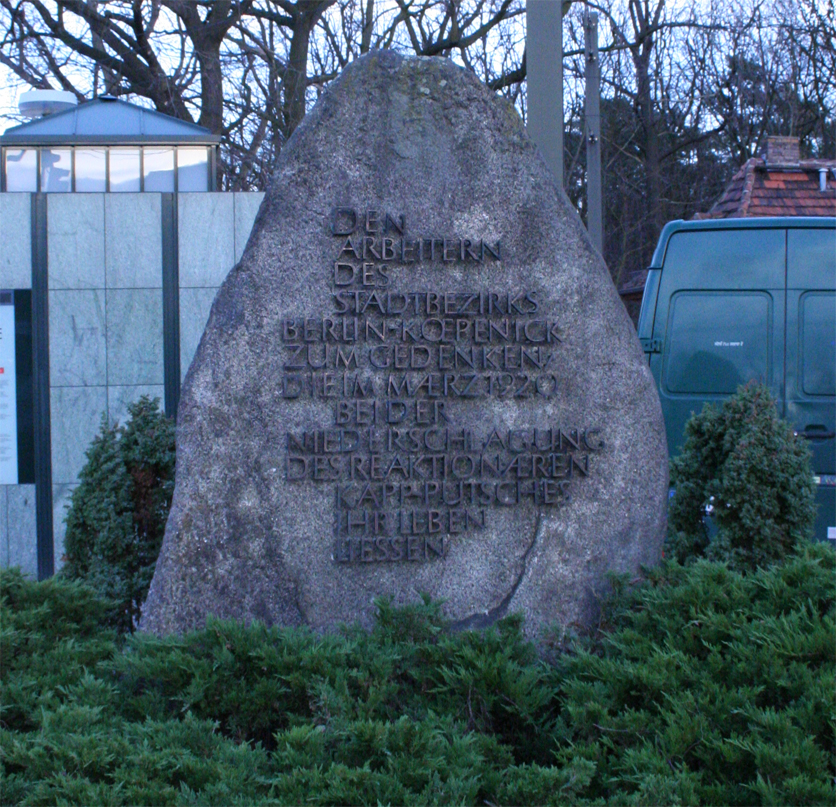
Kapp Putsch memorial
