= Zeuthener See =

Lake in the states of Berlin and Brandenburg, Germany

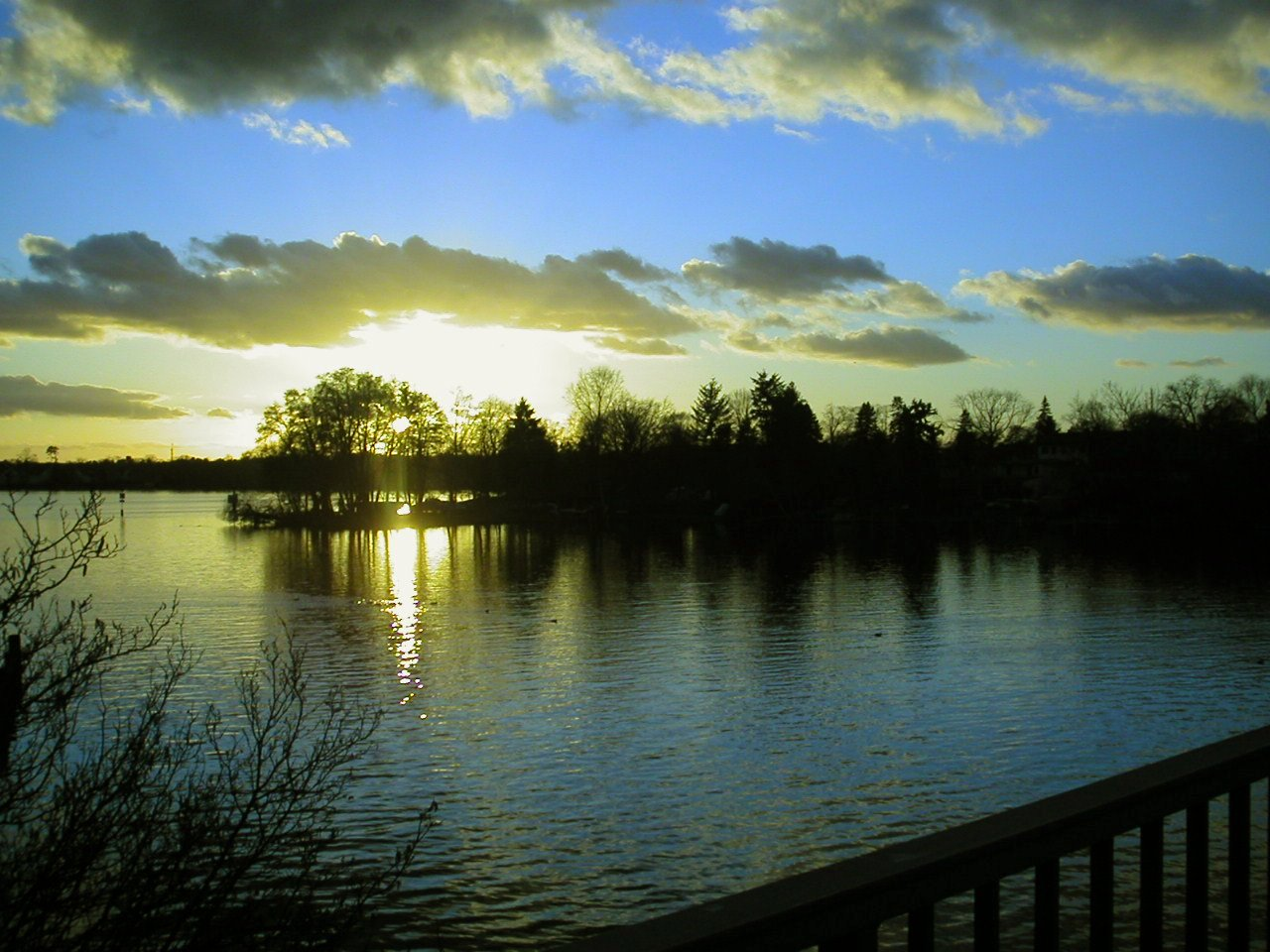

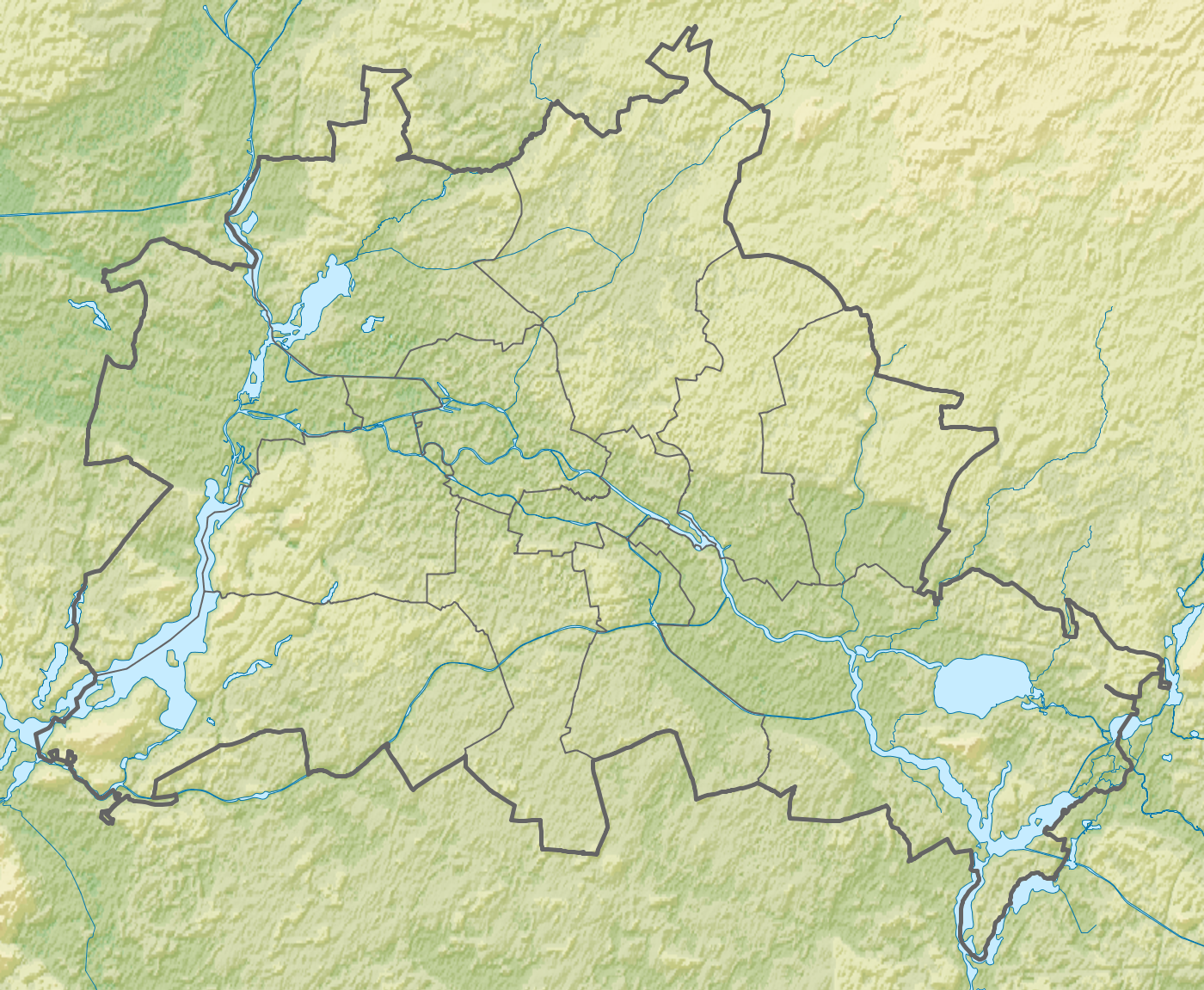
- Location within Berlin Location within Germany
- Location: Brandenburg, Berlin
- Coordinates: 52°21′23″N 13°38′19″E
- Primary inflows: Dahme River
- Primary outflows: Dahme River
- Basin countries: Germany
- Max. length: ca. 4 km (2.5 mi)
- Max. width: 840 m (2,760 ft)
- Surface area: 2.33 km^{2} (0.90 sq mi)
- Max. depth: 4.4 m (14 ft)
- Water volume: 5,840,000 m^{3} (206,000,000 cu ft)
- Surface elevation: 34 m (112 ft)
- Islands: Zeuthener Wall
- Settlements: Zeuthen

The Zeuthener See (German pronunciation) is a lake situated to the south-east of Berlin, the capital city of Germany, in the states of Berlin and Brandenburg. At an elevation of 34 metres (112 ft), its surface area is 2.33 square kilometres (0.90 sq mi).

== Overview ==
While the Brandenburg municipalities of Zeuthen and Eichwalde are situated on its western shore, the wooded eastern bank and the tiny Zeuthener Wall island belong to the Berlin borough of Treptow-Köpenick. The polymictic lake is traversed by the River Dahme.

The Dahme flows into the Zeuthener See at its southern end, where it meets the linked Grosser Zug and Krossinsee lakes. It flows out by the Berlin suburb of Schmöckwitz, where the Zeuthener See meets the Langer See and Seddinsee lakes. The Zeuthener See is navigable, and carries traffic from the Berlin area to the upstream reaches of the Dahme.
