= Seddinsee =

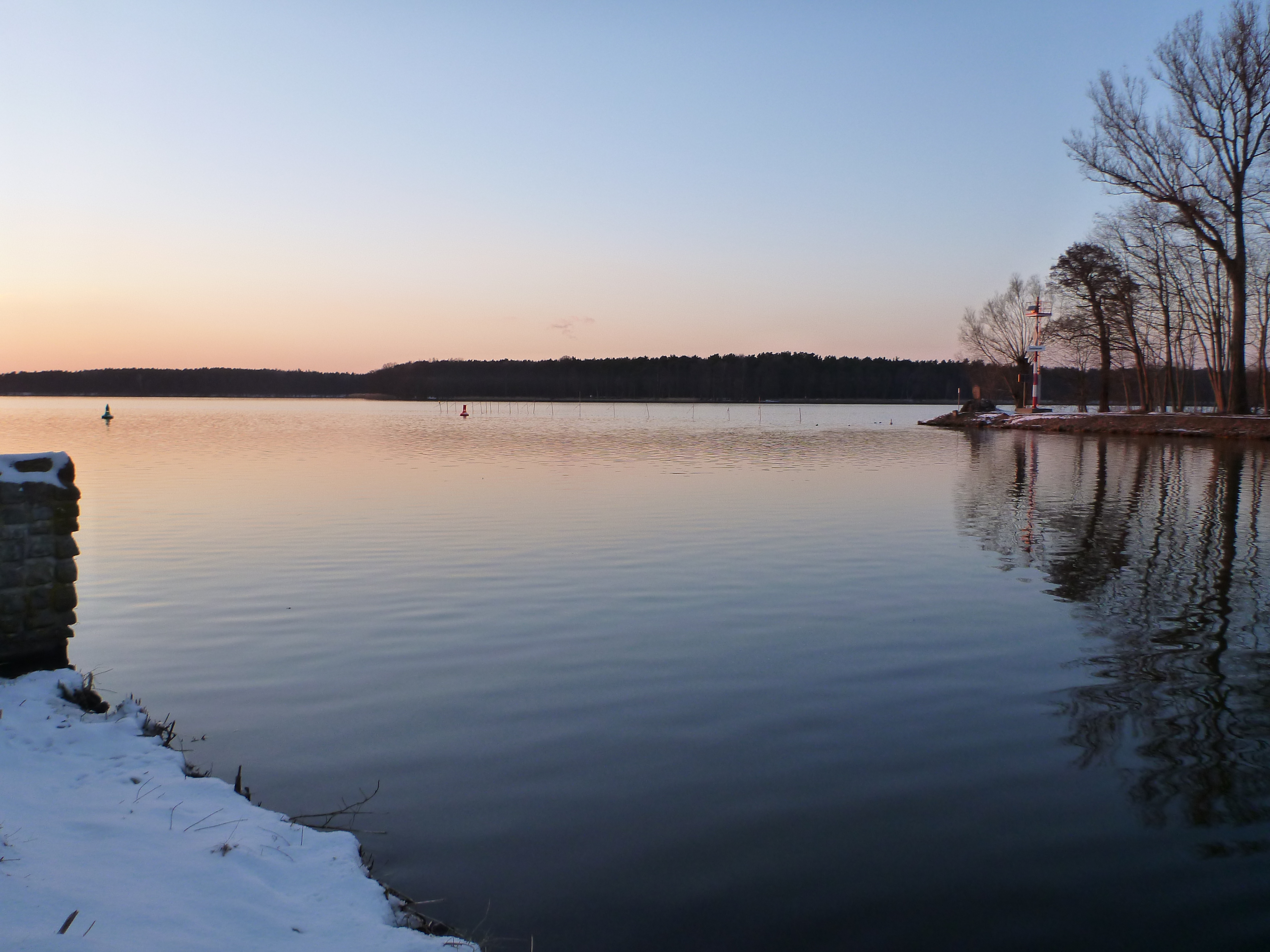
- Seddinsee from Oder-Spree Canal

- Location within Germany
- Location: Berlin, Germany
- Coordinates: 52.387597°N 13.679266°E
- Type: lake
- Max. length: 2.9 kilometres (1.8 mi)
- Max. width: 1,000 metres (3,300 ft)

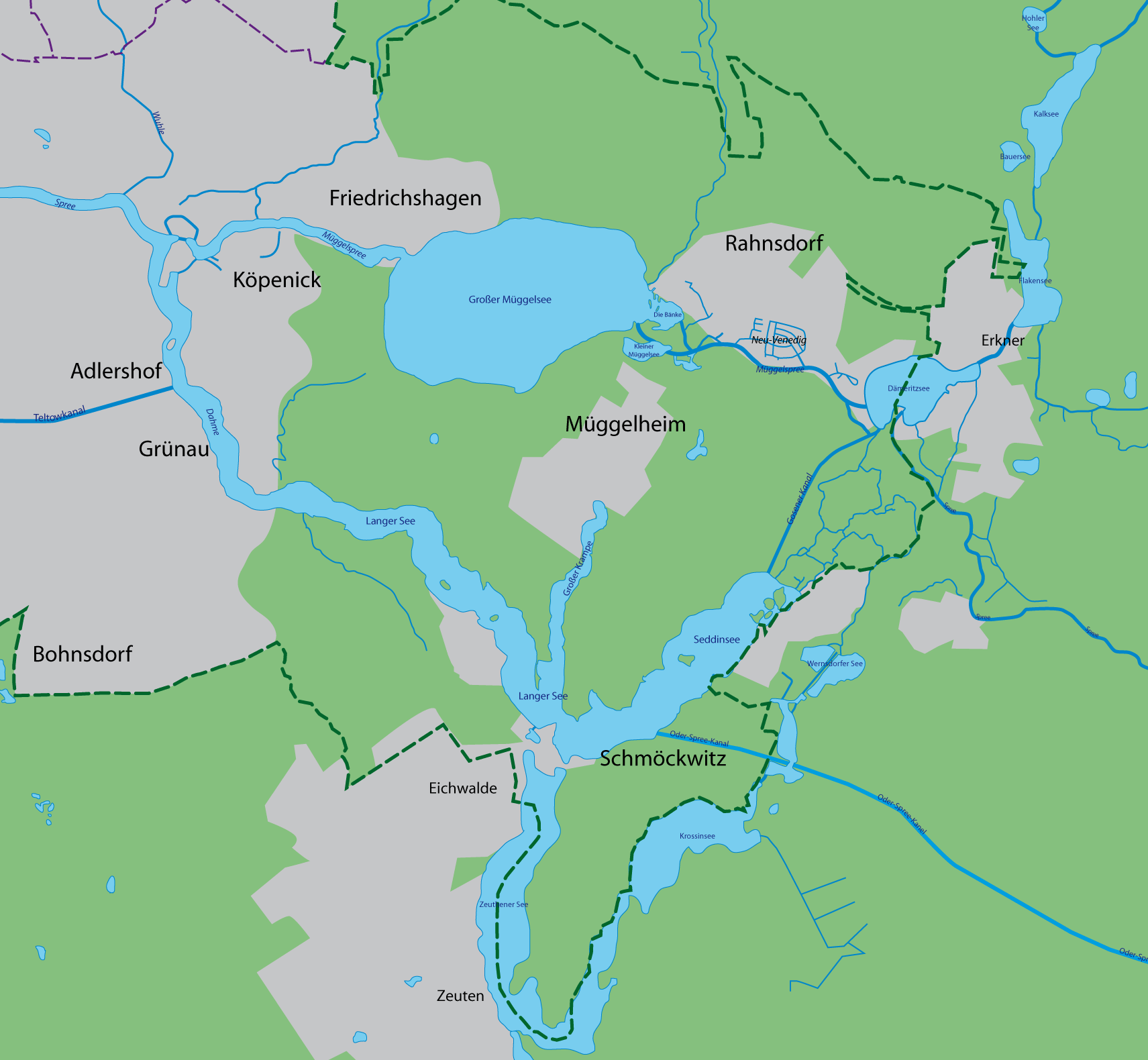
Map of the waterways of south-east Berlin, with the Seddinsee centre-right

The Seddinsee is a lake in the south-eastern outskirts of Berlin, the capital city of Germany. It is aligned south-west to north-east, with its south-western end adjacent to the Berlin suburb of Schmöckwitz. Here, the Seddinsee meets the Zeuthener See and Langer See, two lakes that form part of the course of the River Dahme.

Especially at the northern end, there are natural moorland areas along the shore, which, together with the Gosener Wiesen are protected nature reserves and contain peat layers up to seven meters thick. There is also a sandy beach, however.

The Seddinsee is navigable. It has a length of about 2.9 kilometres (1.8 mi) and a width between 500 and 1,000 metres (1,600 and 3,300 ft). Several little islands are in the lake, one of them was illegally excavated by an investor in 2018.

Besides its natural connection to the River Dahme, the Oder-Spree Canal enters the lake on its eastern shore, whilst the Gosen Canal links the lake's northern end to the Dämeritzsee. Besides considerable sightseeing and leisure traffic, the lake links several commercial navigation routes, including the route from Berlin to Poland via the River Dahme and the Oder-Spree Canal.
