= Ferry transport in Berlin =

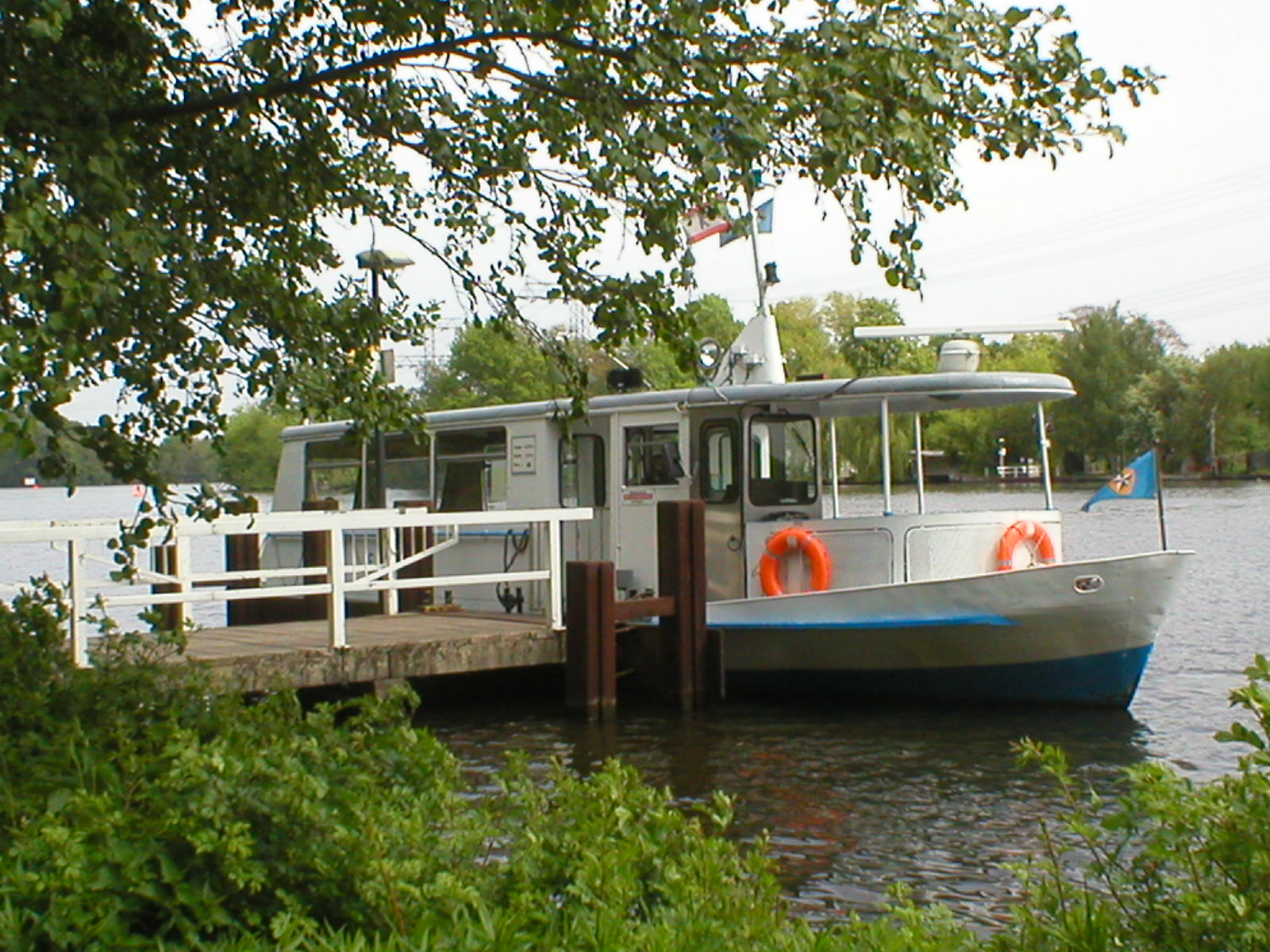
- BVG ferry of the line F11

Overview
- Locale: Berlin; Germany
- Transit type: Public ferry transport
- Number of lines: 6

Operation
- Began operation: 1896
- Operator: Berliner Verkehrsbetriebe (BVG); Verkehrsbetrieb Potsdam (ViP); Various private operators
System map
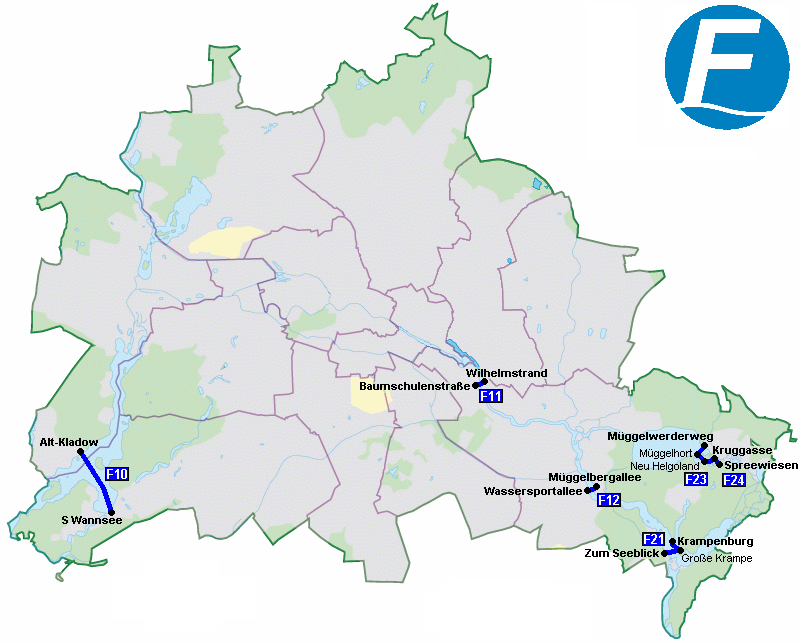

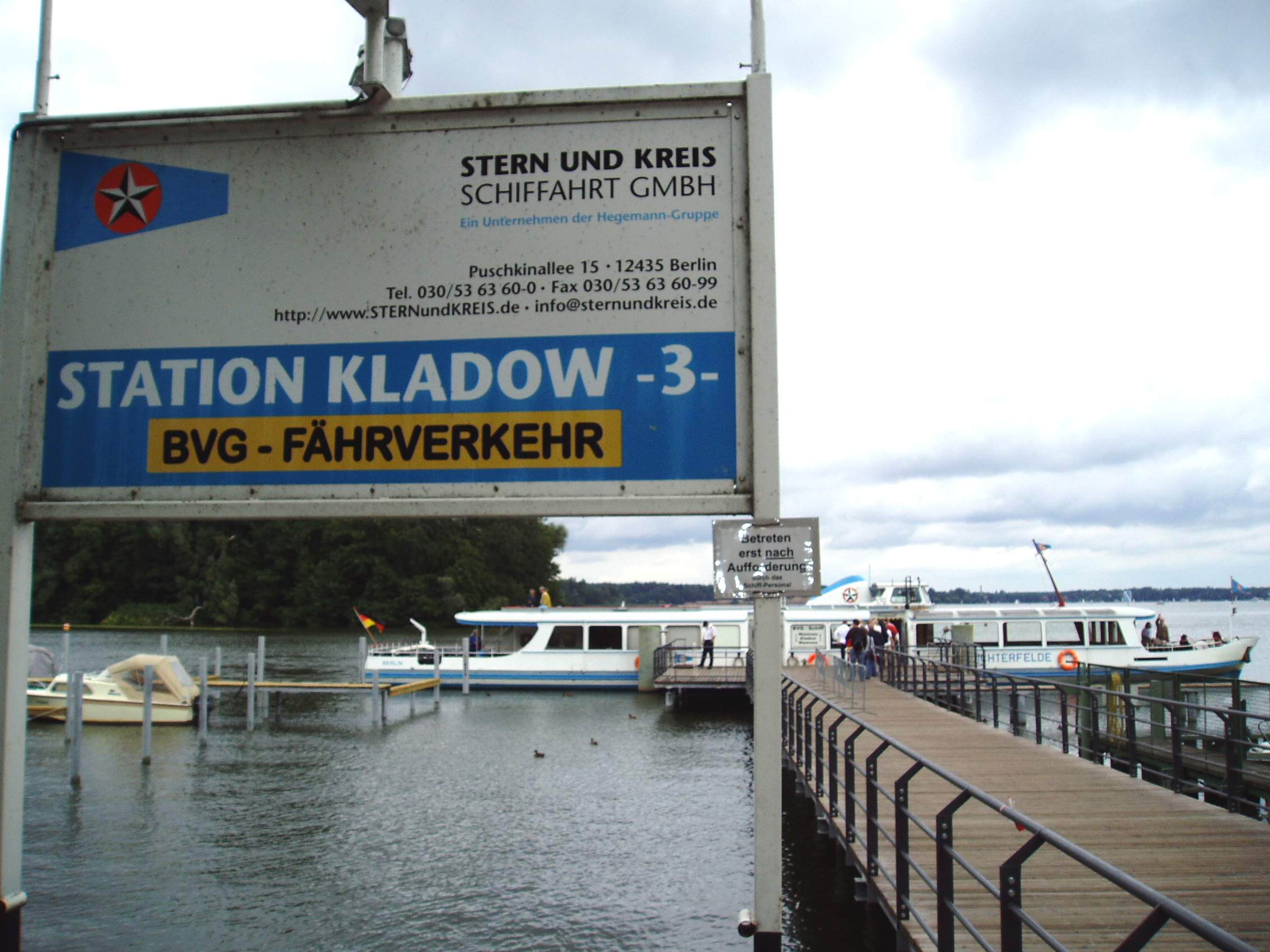
Kladow station of F10 line

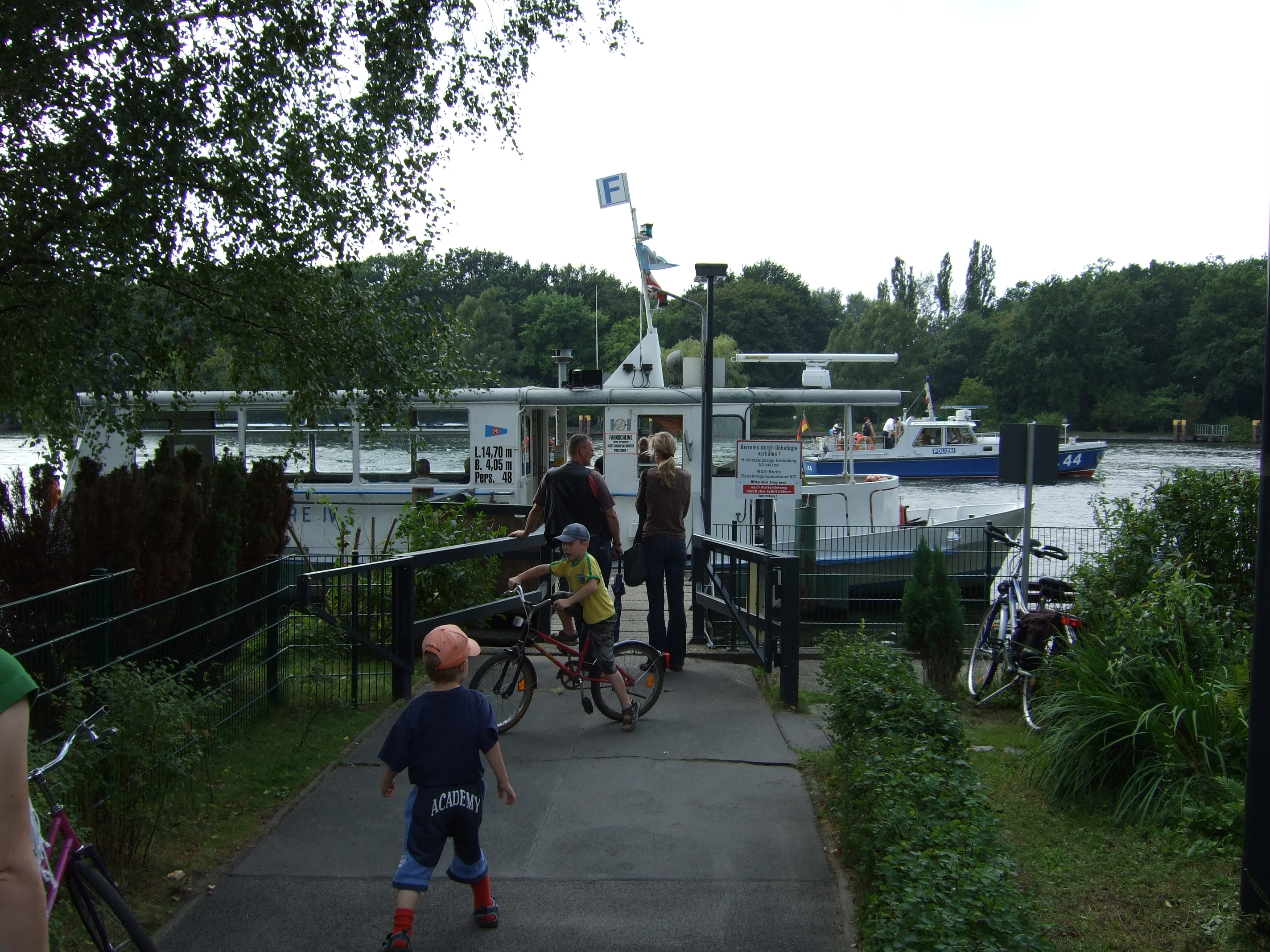
Wilhelmstrand station of F11 line

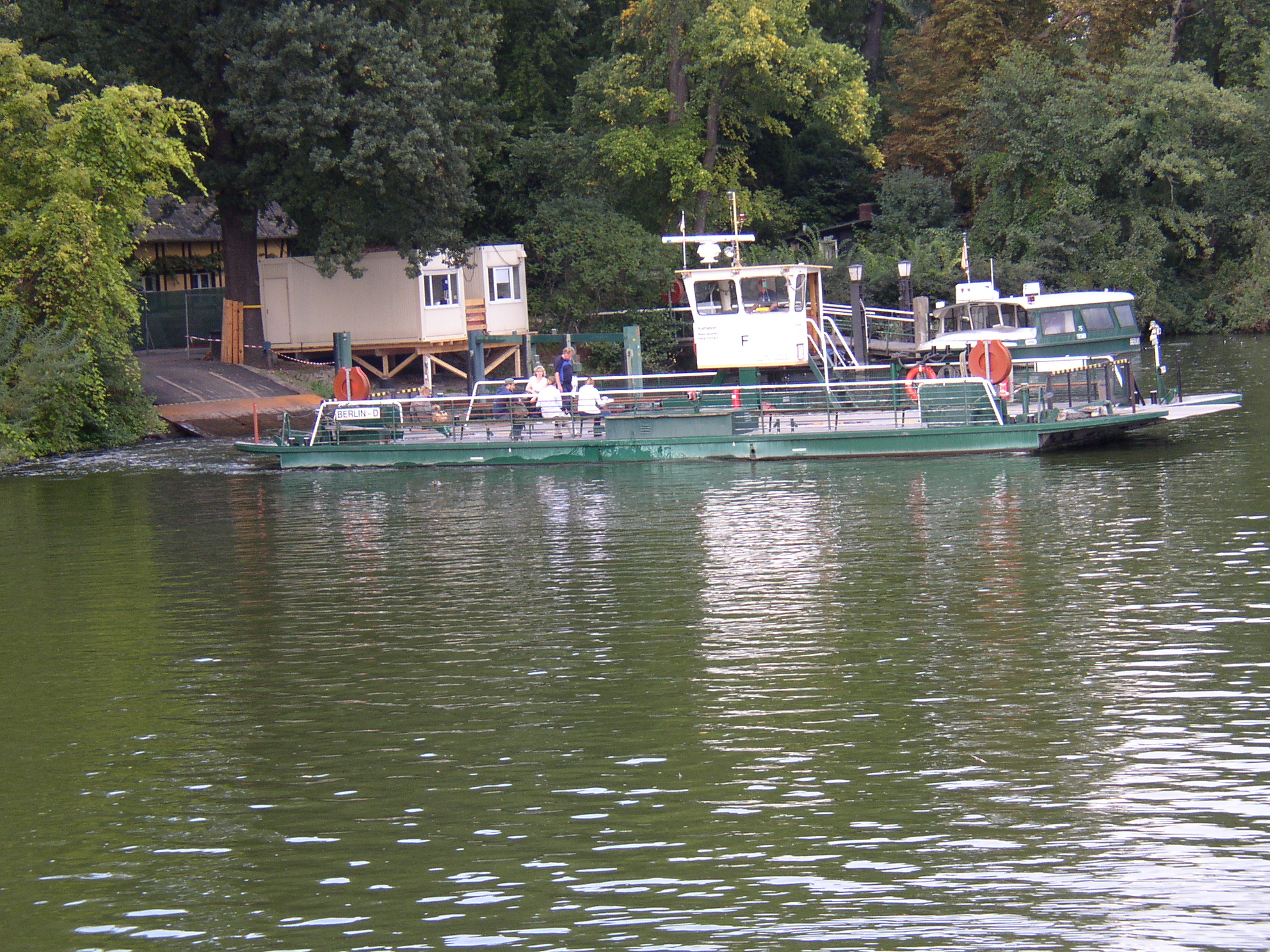
A private ferry at Pfaueninsel

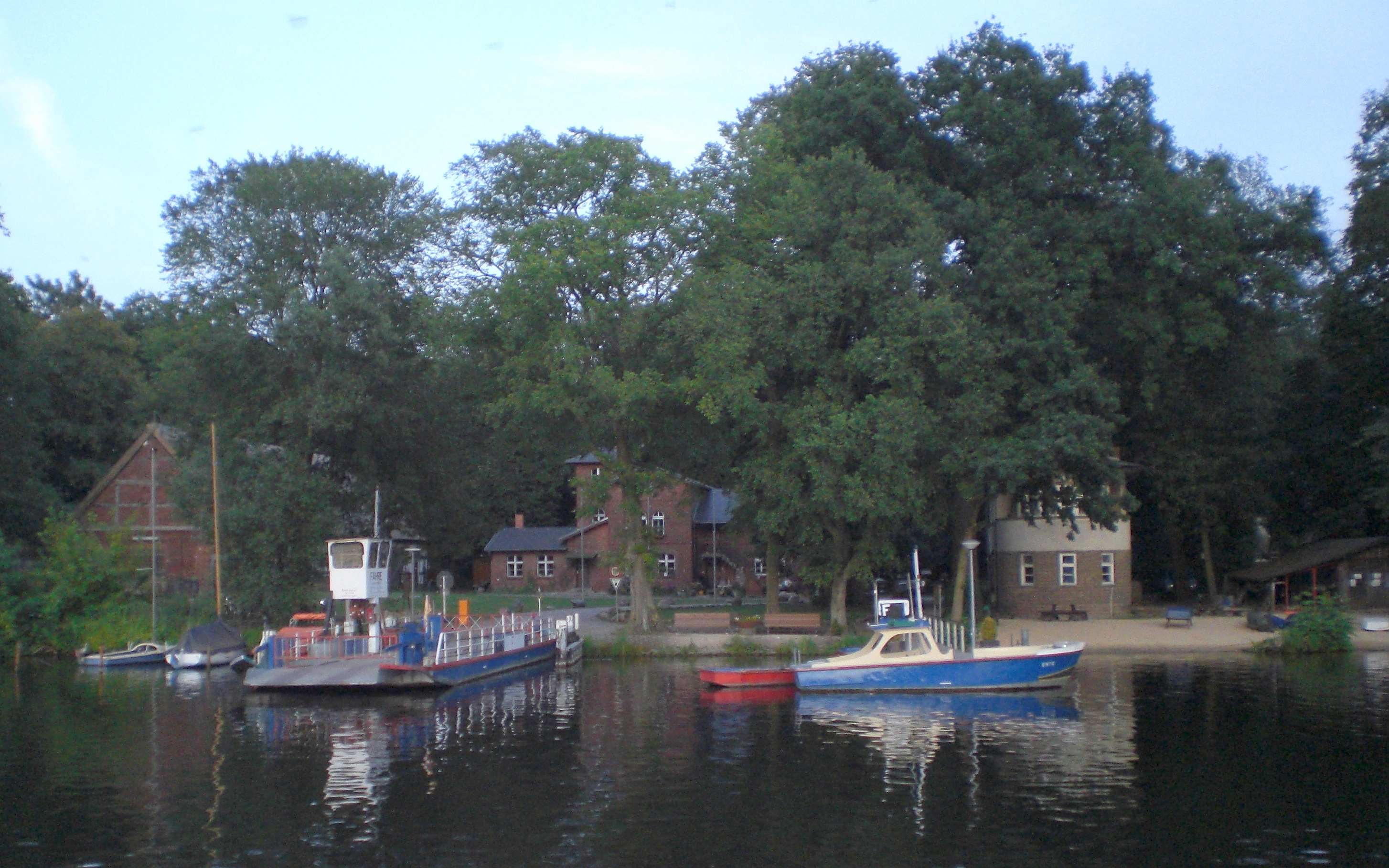
A private ferry at Scharfenberg

Ferry transport forms part of the transport network of Berlin due to the city's extensive network of rivers, lakes, and canals. 6 routes operate within the city boundaries and one serves the city of Potsdam, which are part of the common public transport tariff run by the Verkehrsverbund Berlin-Brandenburg (VBB).

Outside of this system there are private and tourist ferries, the Straussee Ferry is notable as it is one of only a handful of electrically operated cable ferries in the world.

== Routes ==
=== Routes within the city and the VBB common tariff ===
There are 6 passenger ferry routes that operate within the city boundaries of Berlin and are part of the common public transport tariff run by the Verkehrsverbund Berlin-Brandenburg (VBB). All 6 routes are operated by Stern und Kreisschiffahrt by order of the Berliner Verkehrsbetriebe (BVG), the operator of Berlin's U-Bahn, trams and buses.

Line	Route	Duration	Frequency
10	S Wannsee ↔ Alt-Kladow	20 min	60 min
11	Wilhelmstrand ↔ Baumschulenstraße	2 min	10/20 min
12	Müggelbergallee ↔ Wassersportallee	2 min	10/20 min
21	Krampenburg ↔ Zum Seeblick	14 min	60 min
23	Müggelwerderweg ↔ Müggelhort ↔ Neu Helgoland ↔ Kruggasse	25 min	60 min
24	Spreewiesen ↔ Kruggasse	5 min	60 min

The 6 lines run mainly in Treptow-Köpenick district, except for the 10, which runs from Steglitz-Zehlendorf to Spandau, through Großer Wannsee lake and Havel river. The localities (Ortsteile) served by this service are Wannsee, Kladow, Oberschöneweide, Baumschulenweg, Köpenick, Grünau, Müggelheim (5 stops), Schmöckwitz and Rahnsdorf (2 stops).

The 24 is operated with a rowing boat, whilst all the other ferry lines are operated by passenger carrying motor boats. The timetable with one departure every 60 minutes for the 24 is necessary to be found in the journey planning software and to fulfill legal restrictions stating that all public traffic needs to have a timetable. In reality, it drives as often as needed, increasing the frequency to about every 5 minutes if necessary. With the end of the 2013 season, this ferry has terminated its operation and will be included to the ferry line 23. Beginning May 1st, 2015, the ferry started operation again with a reduced service, operating now only on weekends and public holidays.

=== Routes outside the city but within the VBB common tariff ===
One other passenger ferry route, within the adjacent city of Potsdam and operated by the Verkehrsbetrieb Potsdam, is also included in the tariff of the VBB:

Line	Route	Duration	Frequency
1	Kiewitt Ferry (Hermannswerder ↔ Auf dem Kiewitt)	3 min	15 min

The 1 is operated by a passenger carrying cable ferry.

=== Other routes ===
Within Berlin there are also some touristic and private ferry routes that are not managed by BVG and do not form part of the VBB common tariff. These include:

- The Hakenfelde–Tegelort ferry, a car ferry between Hakenfelde and Konradshöhe (in Spandau and Reinickendorf)
- A passenger ferry between Hakenfelde and Konradshöhe with a stop in the islets of Valentinswerder and Maienwerder (both in Reinickendorf)
- A passenger ferry and a limited access car ferry between the Pfaueninsel and the Düppel forest in Wannsee (in Steglitz-Zehlendorf)
- A passenger ferry and a limited access car ferry to and from Lindwerder island in the Havel (in Steglitz-Zehlendorf)
- Some ferries to Scharfenberg island through Lake Tegel (in Reinickendorf)

To the east of Berlin, the Straussee Ferry crosses the Straussee lake in the town of Strausberg. The ferry is notable as it is one of only a handful of electrically operated cable ferries in the world. Although it is not within Berlin city limits and is not part of the VBB common tariff, it's owned by the Strausberg Railway, who are VBB members. Hence, it is designated as line 39 by the VBB.
