= Oder–Spree Canal =

Canal in Brandenburg, Germany

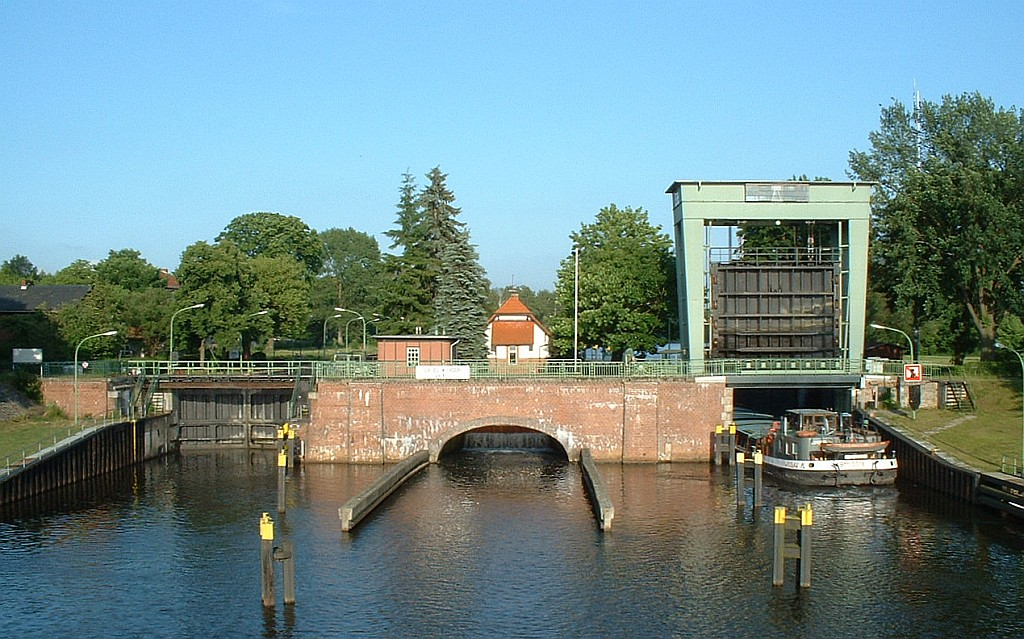
- A lock on the Oder-Spree Canal in Wernsdorf
- Interactive map of Oder–Spree Canal
- Location: Berlin
- Country: Germany
- Coordinates: 52°22′40″N 13°40′32″E

Specifications
- Length: 20 km (12 miles)

History
- Date completed: 1891

Geography
- Direction: East-west
- Start point: River Oder, at Eisenhüttenstadt
- End point: River Dahme river, at Schmöckwitz
- Beginning coordinates: 52.1479°N 14.6824°E
- Ending coordinates: 52.3791°N 13.6690°E

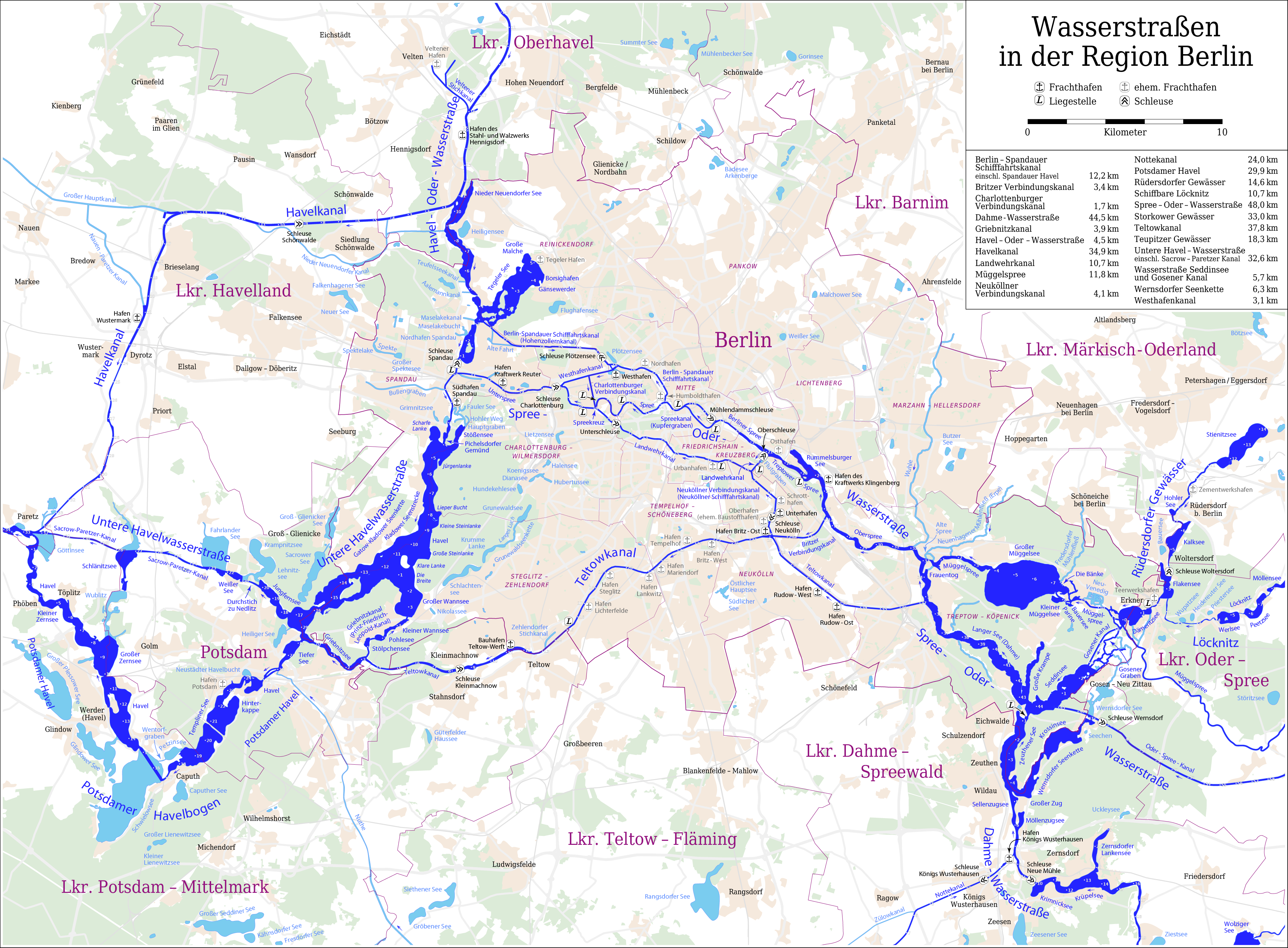
Map of waterways in the Berlin region

The Oder–Spree Canal (German: Oder-Spree-Kanal pronounced [ˌoːdɐˈʃpʁeː.kaˌnaːl]), is a canal in the east of Germany. It links the Dahme river, at Schmöckwitz in the south-eastern suburbs of Berlin, with the River Oder, at Eisenhüttenstadt. It provides an important commercial navigable connection between Berlin and the Oder, and hence Poland.

The canal has several connections to the River Spree. For a stretch of about 20 kilometres (12 mi) near Fürstenwalde the canal utilises the river as part of its route, and there is a navigable connection to the river upstream of this section, although these reaches are relatively shallow and are generally only used by leisure craft. However the principal connection is via the River Dahme, which joins the River Spree at Köpenick, to the east of the centre of Berlin.
