= Dahme (river) =

River in Germany

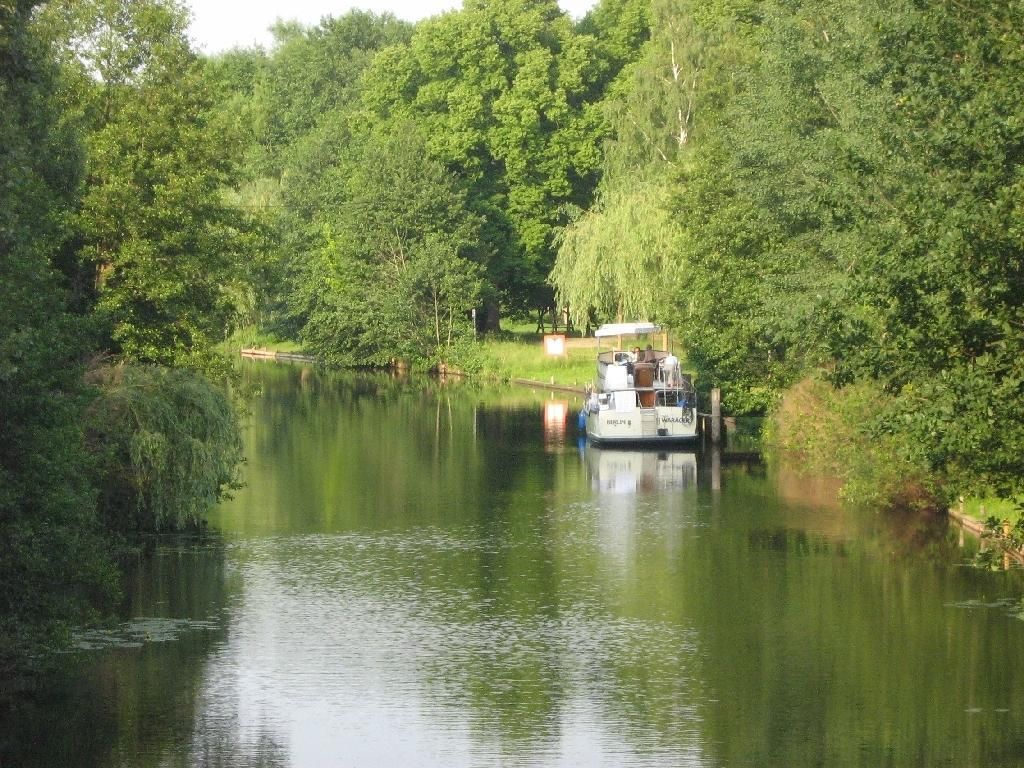
- The Dahme below Märkisch Buchholz

Location
- Country: Germany

Physical characteristics
- Source
  - location: Brandenburg
- Mouth
  - location: Spree
  - coordinates: 52°26′53″N 13°34′23″E
- Length: 95 km (59 mi)

Basin features
- Progression: Spree→ Havel→ Elbe→ North Sea

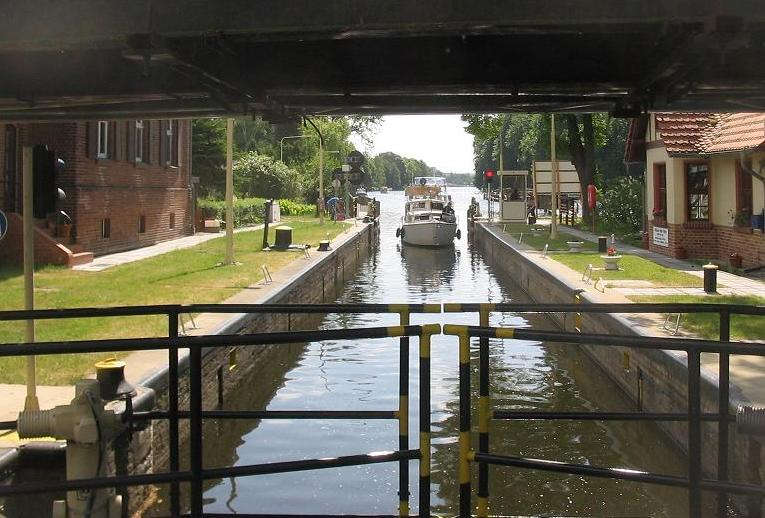
The lock at Neue Mühle near Königs Wusterhausen

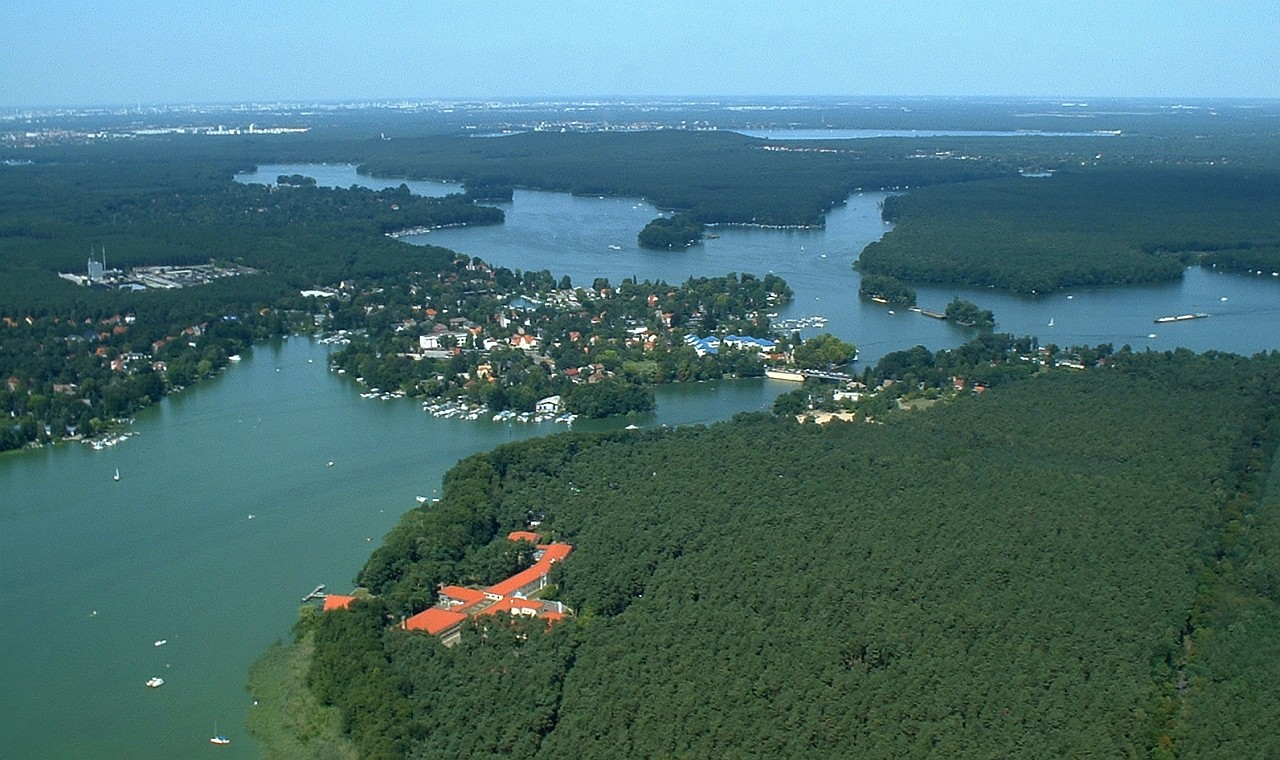
The junction of the Zeuthener See (lower left) Seddinsee (right) and Langer See (upper left) at Schmöckwitz (centre). The Müggelsee can be seen in the distance.

The Dahme (German pronunciation: [ˈdaːmə]) is a river that flows through the German states of Brandenburg and Berlin. It is a left bank tributary of the River Spree and is approximately 95 kilometres (59 mi) long.

== Course ==
The source of the Dahme is near the eponymous town Dahme.

The river flows north through the towns of Märkisch Buchholz and Prieros. At Märkisch Buchholz the river is joined by the Dahme Flood Relief Canal that diverts water from the upper reaches of the River Spree at Leibsch. At Prieros the Dahme is joined by two tributaries, the Storkower Gewässer on the right bank and the Teupitzer Gewässer on the left bank. Both of these tributaries comprise a chain of linked lakes.

North of Prieros the Dahme flows through a number of lakes, including the Dolgenzee, Krüpelsee and Krimnicksee before reaching the city of Königs Wusterhausen. The fjord-like Zernsdorfer Lankensee joins the Krüpelsee as a right-bank tributary. A short section of the Dahme downstream of the Krimnicksee is also called Staabe. At Königs Wusterhausen the River Notte joins as a left-bank tributary.

Downstream of Königs Wusterhausen the river is linked to the Möllenzugsee on the right bank, and shortly thereafter by the linked Grosser Zug and Krossinsee on the same bank. The Dahme then flows into the Zeuthener See, which links to the Seddinsee and Langer See at the outer Berlin suburb of Schmöckwitz. The Dahme flows out of the Langer See at its north-western end, shortly before it confluence with the River Spree at Köpenick, a historic town that is now a suburb of Berlin.

== Navigation ==
The Dahme is navigable as far upstream as Märkisch Buchholz, although the reach above Prieros is shallow and generally only used by leisure craft. Canoes and similar craft can bypass a weir near Märkisch Buchholz and enter the Dahme Flood Relief Canal, which is then navigable to its junction with the upper Spree. The Storkower Gewässer is navigable as far as the Scharmützelsee, the Teupitzer Gewässer as far as Teupitzersee. The River Notte is also navigable, as are most of the lakes linked to, or traversed by, the river downstream of Prieros.

The Oder-Spree Canal links with the Seddinsee near Schmöckwitz, with the Oder river, at Eisenhüttenstadt, thus providing a navigable connection between Berlin and the Oder, and hence Poland. The Gosen Canal also links the Sedinsee with the Spree, and thus provides a shorter route to the Müggelsee, Woltersdorf and Rüdersdorf for traffic coming downstream.
