= Eichwalde =

- Municipality
- Coat of arms

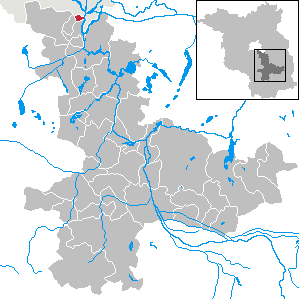
- Location of Eichwalde within Dahme-Spreewald district
- Interactive map of Eichwalde
- Location within Germany Location within Brandenburg
- Coordinates: 52°22′00″N 13°37′00″E
- Country: Germany
- State: Brandenburg
- District: Dahme-Spreewald

Government
  - Mayor (2017–25): Jörg Jenoch (Ind.)

Area
  - Total: 2.79 km^{2} (1.08 sq mi)
- Elevation: 35 m (115 ft)

Population (2025-12-31)
  - Total: 6,380
  - Density: 2,290/km^{2} (5,920/sq mi)
- Time zone: UTC+01:00 (CET)
  - Summer (DST): UTC+02:00 (CEST)
- Postal codes: 15732
- Dialling codes: 030
- Vehicle registration: LDS
- Website: www.eichwalde.de

Eichwalde (German pronunciation: [aɪçˈvaldə]) is a municipality of the Dahme-Spreewald district in Brandenburg, Germany, situated at the southeastern Berlin city limits. With 2.8 km² (1.1 sq mi) it is the smallest Brandenburg municipality by area, while its population density is the second highest (after Glienicke/Nordbahn).

== Demography ==
Development of Population since 1875 within the Current Boundaries (Blue Line: Population; Dotted Line: Comparison to Population Development of Brandenburg state; Grey Background: Time of Nazi rule; Red Background: Time of Communist rule)

Recent Population Development and Projections (Population Development before Census 2011 (blue line); Recent Population Development according to the Census in Germany in 2011 (blue bordered line); Official projections for 2005-2030 (yellow line); for 2020-2030 (green line); for 2017-2030 (scarlet line)

Eichwalde: Population development
within the current boundaries (2017)

Year	Pop.	±% p.a.
1875	54	—
1890	28	−4.28%
1910	1,565	+22.28%
1925	3,069	+4.59%
1933	4,815	+5.79%
1939	6,318	+4.63%
1946	5,847	−1.10%
1950	6,493	+2.65%
1964	6,352	−0.16%
1971	6,377	+0.06%
1981	5,962	−0.67%
1985	5,705	−1.10%
1989	5,218	−2.21%
1990	5,141	−1.48%
1991	5,030	−2.16%

Year	Pop.	±% p.a.
1992	4,942	−1.75%
1993	4,860	−1.66%
1994	4,864	+0.08%
1995	4,887	+0.47%
1996	4,972	+1.74%
1997	5,277	+6.13%
1998	5,551	+5.19%
1999	5,720	+3.04%
2000	5,737	+0.30%
2001	5,749	+0.21%
2002	5,823	+1.29%
2003	5,837	+0.24%
2004	5,976	+2.38%
2005	6,002	+0.44%
2006	6,078	+1.27%

Year	Pop.	±% p.a.
2007	6,073	−0.08%
2008	6,114	+0.68%
2009	6,113	−0.02%
2010	6,205	+1.50%
2011	6,252	+0.76%
2012	6,305	+0.85%
2013	6,359	+0.86%
2014	6,421	+0.97%
2015	6,426	+0.08%
2016	6,490	+1.00%
2017	6,449	−0.63%
2018	6,468	+0.29%
2019	6,420	−0.74%
2020	6,452	+0.50%

== History ==
The land settlement of Eichwalde was founded on March 20, 1893. The name means "oak wood" in German.

== Culture ==
=== Museums ===
The Old Firestation is a cultural center of the town. In the building many concerts, exhibitions, readings and other cultural events are organized by the local Freundeskreis Alte Feuerwache e.V. (Circle of friends of the Old Fire Station) take place.

=== Music ===
- The last remaining Parabrahm pipe organ (constructed in 1908) of the world

=== Buildings ===
- Center of Eichwalde with an impressive ensemble of buildings from the time of the founding of Eichwalde, for example the Humboldt-Gymnasium (Humboldt High School) and the Alte Feuerwache (Old Fire Station)
- Churches: Catholic (St. Anthony, neo-Roman style), Protestant/Lutheran (neo-Gothic style), Methodist (Eben Ezer), New Apostolic, Landeskirchliche Gemeinschaft
- Water tower

=== Monuments of nature ===
- Friedenseiche (Oak of Peace) => Symbol of the Town

=== Videogames ===
- Overwatch based the name of one of their maps named "Eichenwalde" on this city. It is the hometown of the game's German hero, Reinhardt.

== Economy and Infrastructure ==
=== Traffic ===
- Public transport: Berlin S-Bahn Station Eichwalde
- Airport: Berlin-Schönefeld International Airport

== Notable people ==
- Sonja Ziemann, actress
