= Siemensstadt-Fürstenbrunn station =

Railway station in Charlottenburg-Wilmersdorf, Germany

Siemensstadt-Fürstenbrunn
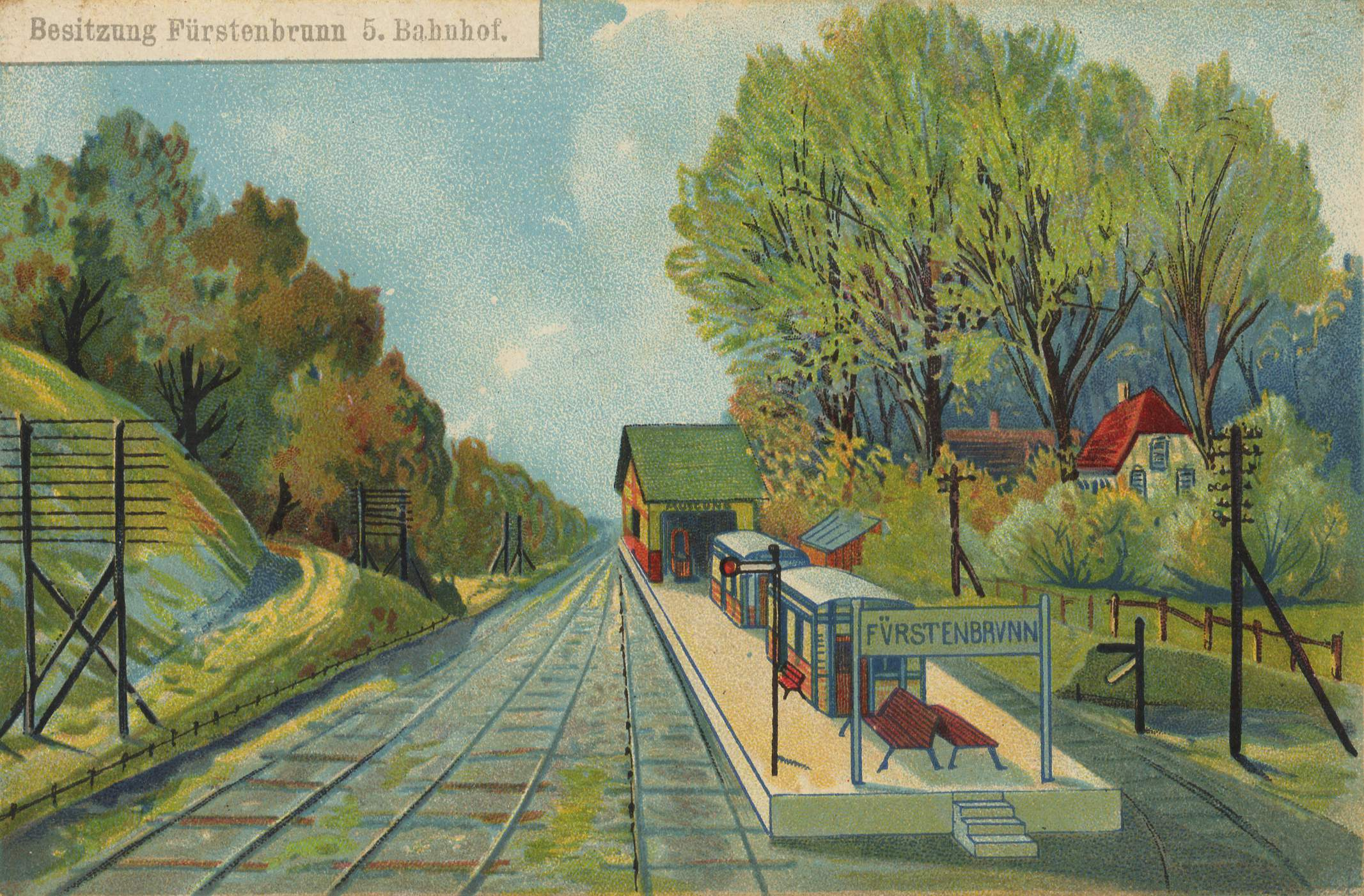
- Fürstenbrunn (later Siemensstadt-Fürstenbrunn) station

General information
- Location: Fürstenbrunner Weg, Berlin; Westend, Charlottenburg-Wilmersdorf, Berlin; Germany
- Coordinates: 52°31′41″N 13°16′10″E
- System: Demolished station
- Line: Hamburg Railway

Other information
- Station code: n/a
- DS100 code: BSMF

History
- Opened: 1 June 1905; 121 years ago
- Closed: 18 September 1980 (strike), officially 28 September 1980; 45 years ago
- Electrified: 28 August 1951; 74 years ago
- Former names: 1905-1925 Fürstenbrunn
Location

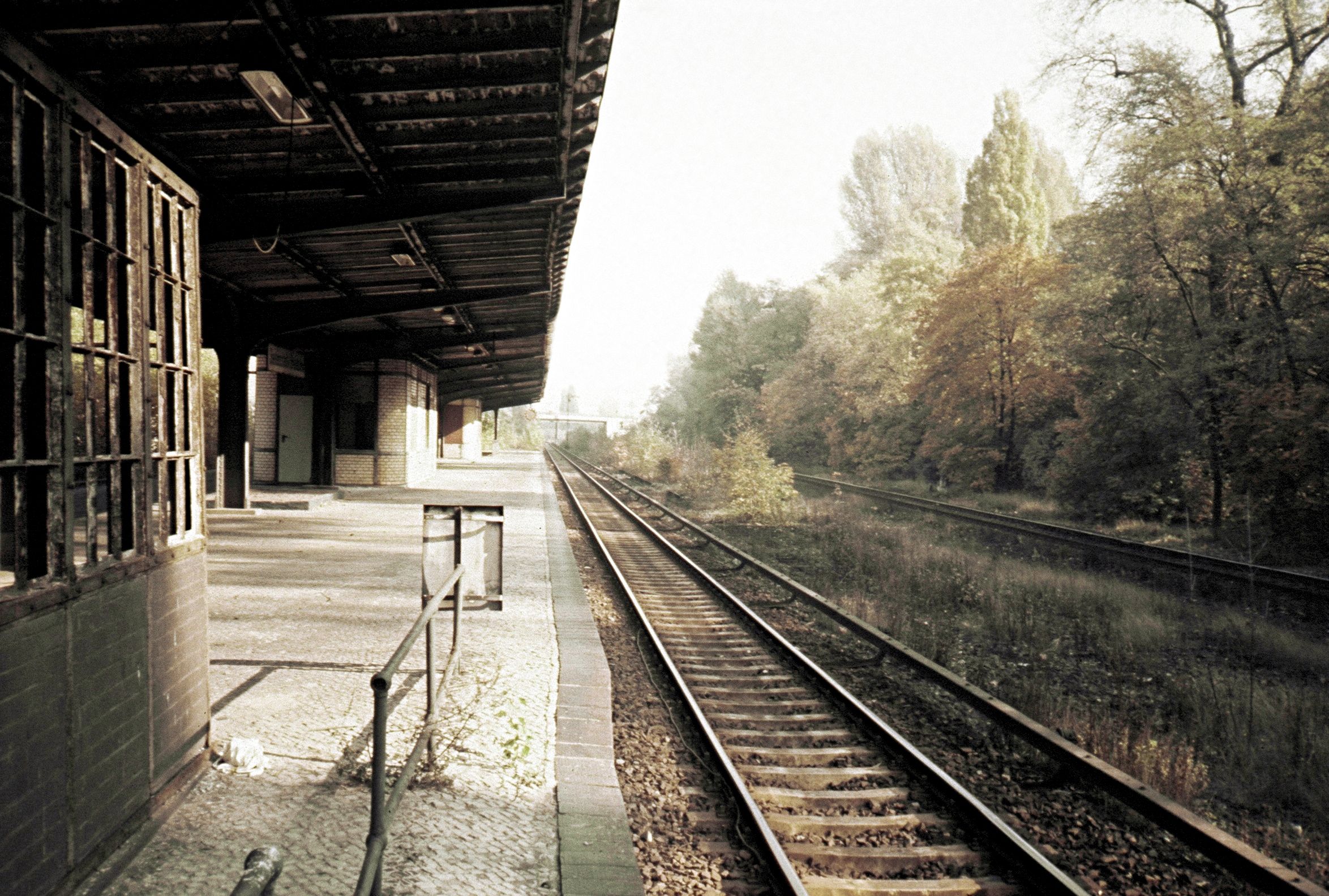
Platform on former track of the Hamburg railway leading out of the city, further to the right is the track of the Lehrte Railway

Siemensstadt-Fürstenbrunn station was a suburban station on the Berlin–Hamburg railway in Westend, a locality of the Charlottenburg-Wilmersdorf borough in Berlin. It was primarily built for workers at its nearby Siemens Works in the neighbouring quarter of Siemensstadt.

== Location ==
The station was built on flat land near the south bank of the Spree in the city of Charlottenburg (which became the Berlin borough of Charlottenburg on 1 October 1920) on the border of the locality of Siemensstadt, part of Spandau. The station building was located on the north side of the line to Hamburg and the Lehrte Railway and its entrance was on Fürstenbrunner Weg.

== Description ==
A single-storey station building with gabled roof was located next to the railway line on a paved area at the junction of the streets of Fürstenbrunner Weg, Ruhwaldweg and Rohrdamm. The covered platform was between the tracks and a northern crossing loop, which was built after the establishment of the station. A staircase led down to the street level. The structure that housed the stairs had half-timbered elements and a nested roof construction.

== History ==
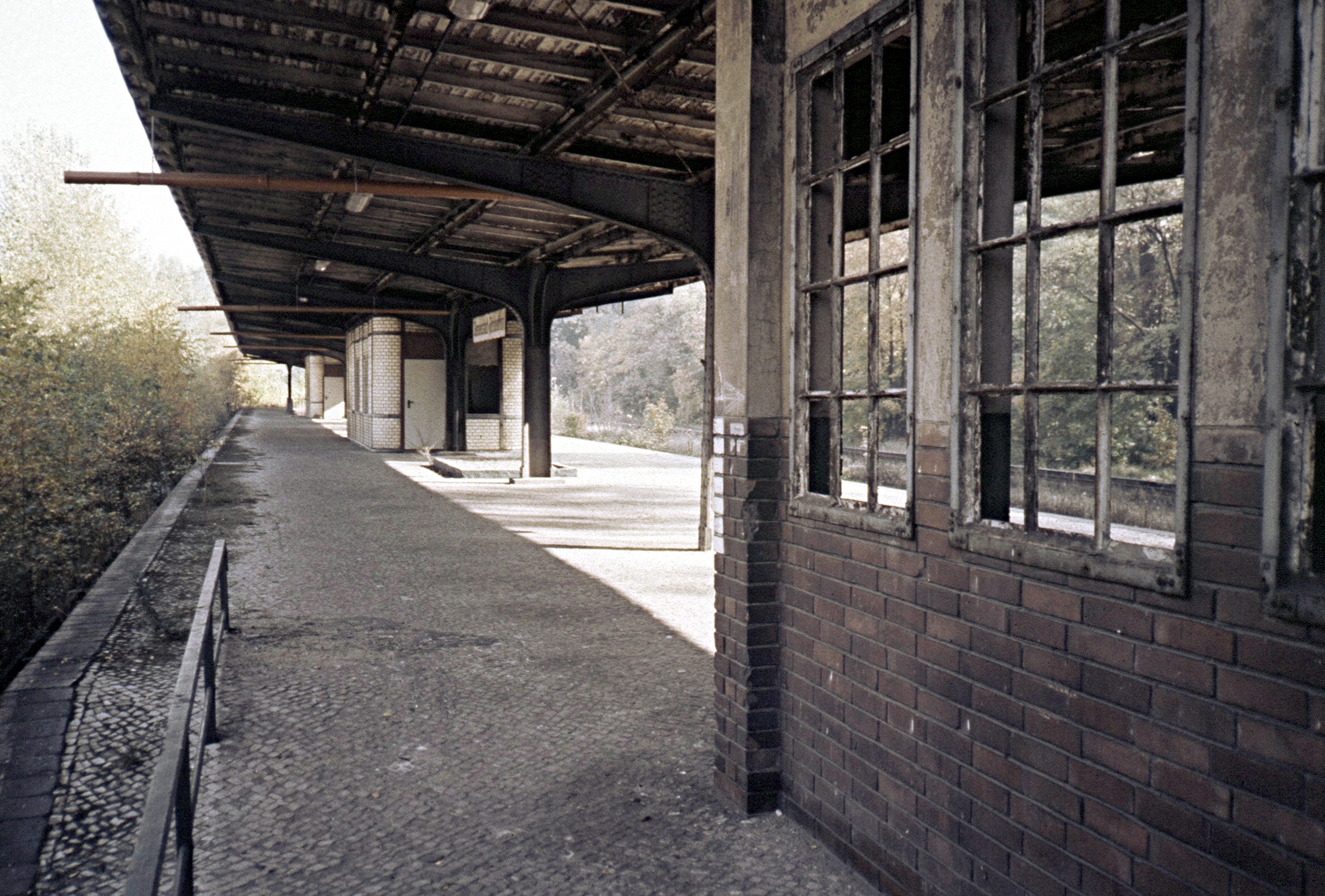
Looking east in 1986, to the left is the already overgrown crossing loop

The Siemens & Halske company financed the construction of the station, which built in consultation with the local administration of the Prussian state railways, but over the objections of the then independent city of Charlottenburg. It was opened on 1 June 1905, originally as a Haltepunkt (“halt”), under the name of Fürstenbrunn. At that time up to 25 pairs of trains ran each day between Spandau and Strausberg on the Hamburg Railway–Stadtbahn link and the Stadtbahn. There were also two or three pairs of trains to and from the northern Ringbahn until the removal of crossovers at Jungfernheide station that made this possible on 30 April 1911.

At shift change times at Siemens, the station was frequented by workers of the company and therefore it was given a second platform track in 1906/1907 and a reversing facility for reinforcement trains from Lehrter Bahnhof (Lehrte station). In 1911, the intervening Putlitzstraße Station also received a reversing facility, allowing the interval between services running between the two stations at the end of shifts to be reduced to three minutes. By 1914, planning had begun for the building of another pair of suburban tracks north of the existing tracks leading from the northern Ringbahn to Fürstenbrunn. Under this plan, the station would have had a second island platform and received extensive facilities for reversing and parking rollingstock. This plan was not carried out because of the First World War.

The station was renamed Siemensstadt-Fürstenbrunn on 1 April 1925. With the commissioning of the Siemens Railway (Siemensbahn) on 18 December 1929, the number of passengers decreased significantly.

Until 27 August 1951, it was served by suburban trains hauled by steam locomotives beginning and ending in the Lehrter Bahnhof. Shortly before its final closure in 1951, the Jungfernheide–Spandau section of the Hamburg Railway was electrified for the S-Bahn, using side-contact third rail. After that, Siemensstadt-Fürstenbrunn station was served by group N (Nordpol) S-Bahn services, originally at 20-minute intervals and from 1976 at 30-minute intervals. They operated on the Spindlersfeld–North Ringbahn–Spandau West route from 1955, between Gesundbrunnen and Staaken from 1971 and only from Beusselstraße to Spandau (now Stresow station) and back from 1972.

As a result of construction of the Berlin Wall and the boycott of the S-Bahn in West Berlin, the number of passengers fell sharply from 1961, so that there was a daily average of only 67 passengers in 1976. The northern passing loop was closed in 1968 and the station became unstaffed in the evening in 1976, which was then uncommon. As a result of the strike by West Berlin employees of Deutsche Reichsbahn in 1980, S-Bahn operations on the Jungfernheide–Spandau section ended on 17 September of that year. The station fell into disuse and the station building was demolished in March 1987 and the platform was demolished in November 1996. During the construction of the Hanover–Berlin high-speed railway, the remaining remnants were demolished.
