= Siemensbahn =

Railway line in Germany

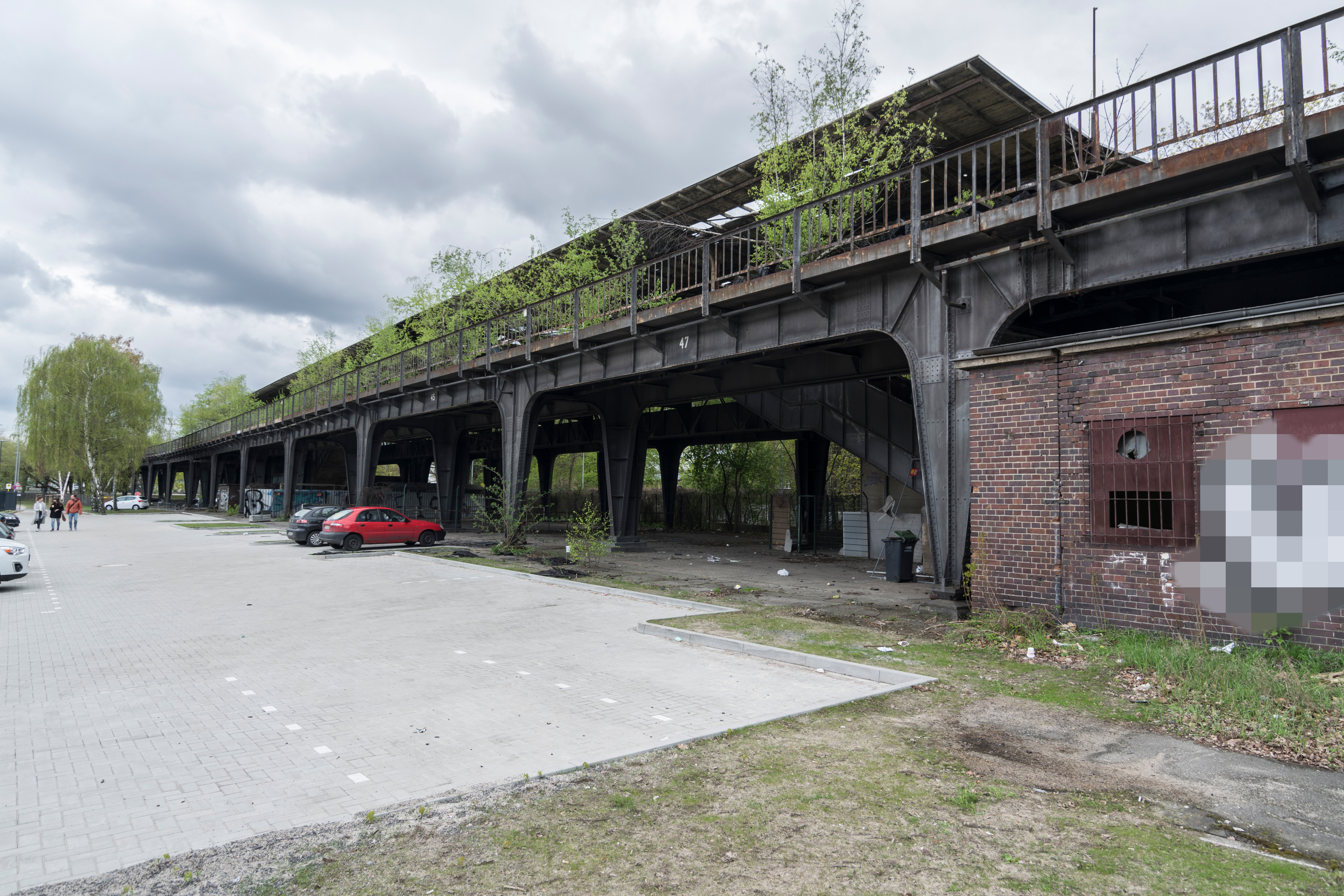
Wernerwerk station (2017)

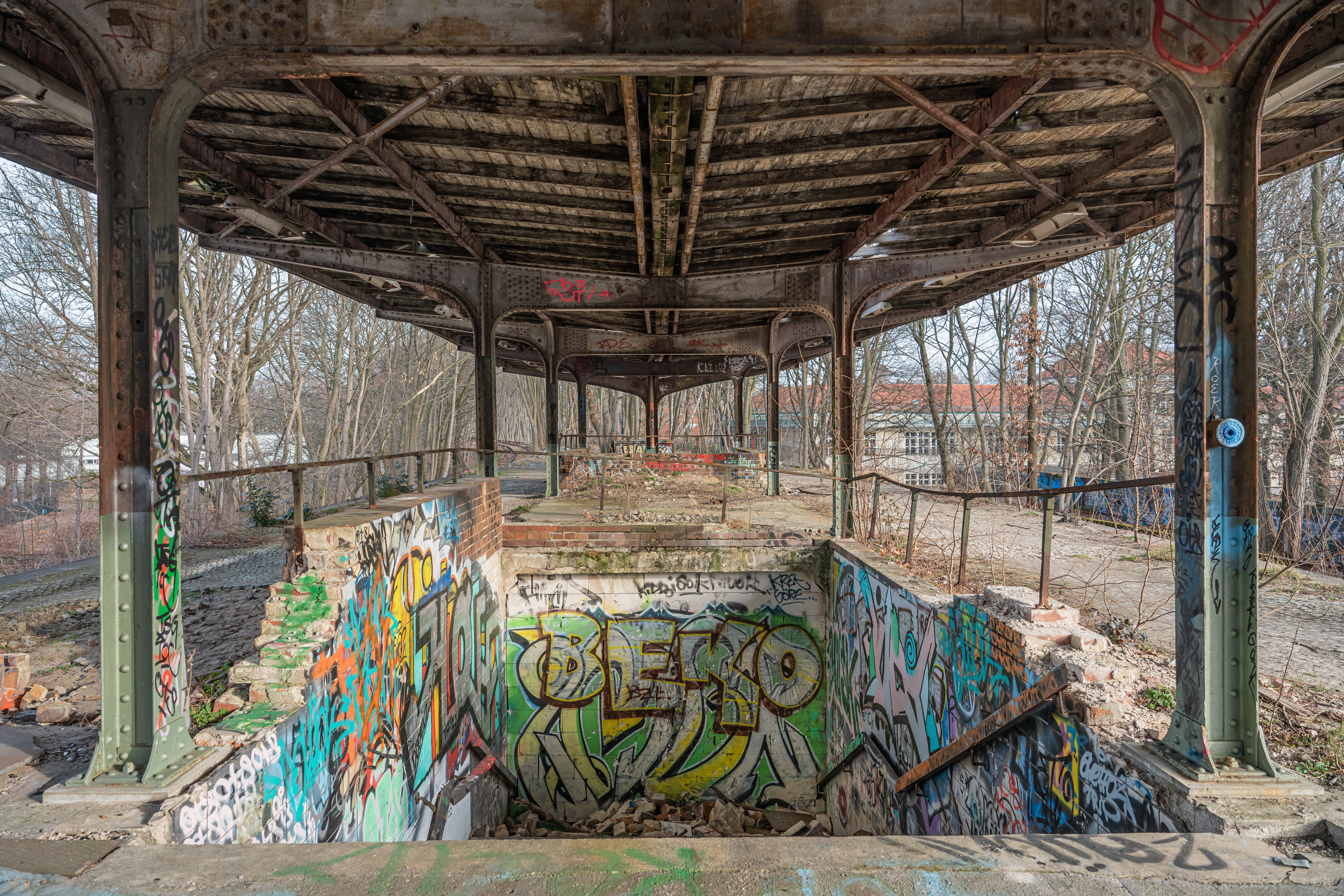
Siemensstadt station (2021)

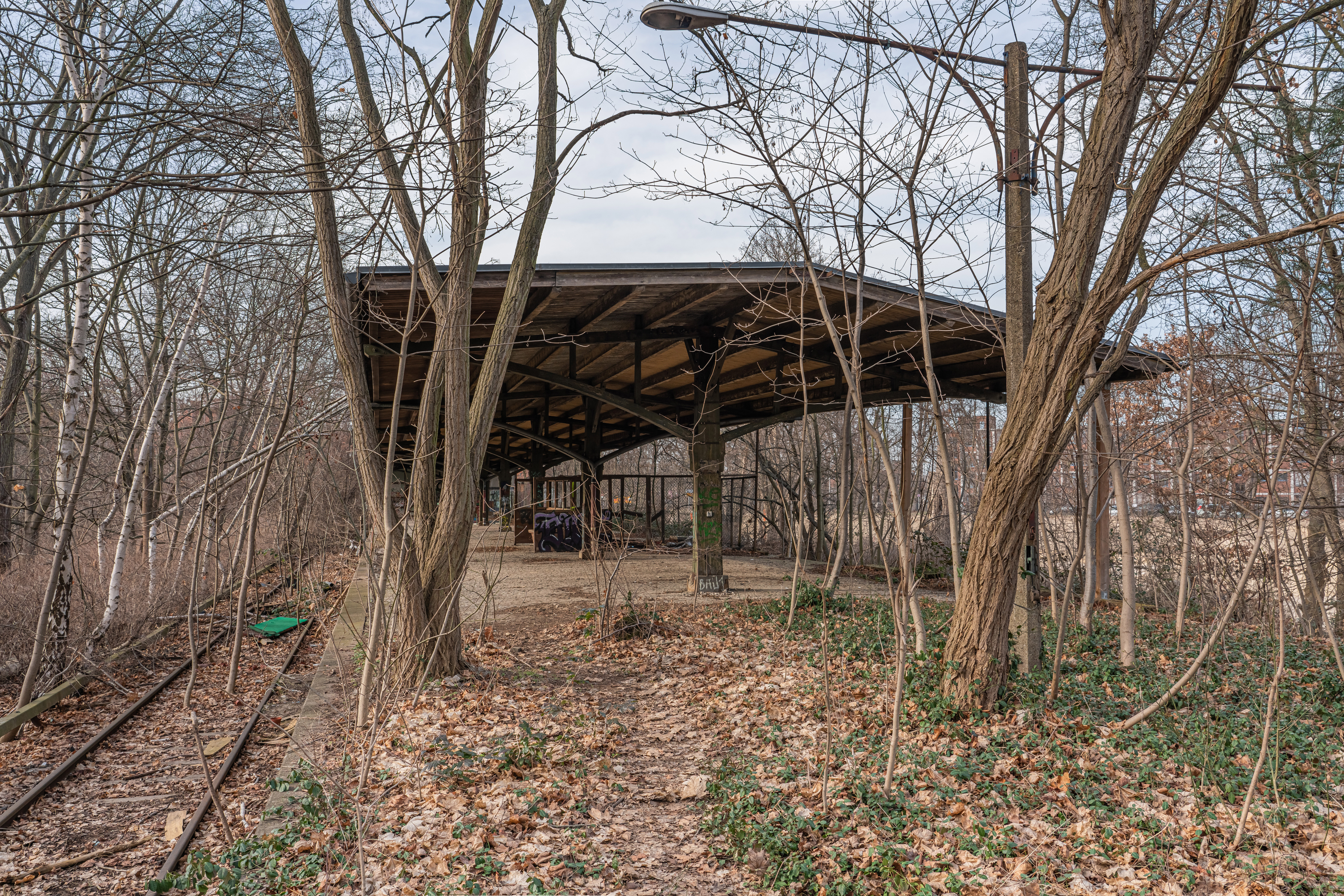
Gartenfeld terminus (2021)

Siemensbahn (German for "Siemens Railway") is an abandoned 4.5 km rapid transit line of the Berlin S-Bahn in Berlin. It was opened in 1929 as a modern, grade-separated, third rail-electrified, double-track heavy rail branch line serving three new train stations, and closed in 1980. The line is undergoing reactivation to serve the redeveloped Siemensstadt Square mixed-use district and surrounding new housing developments. Construction is planned to begin in 2026, with revenue service targeted for 2029. An eventual extension beyond the Gartenfeld terminus to Hakenfelde has been discussed since the line's original construction but remains unplanned as of 2026.

The Siemens & Halske company privately financed the line to improve worker access to its industrial district in the eponymous Siemensstadt locality of Spandau. Siemensstadt not only was home to production and research facilities, but a private town with social and childcare services, housing tracts, sports venues, allotments, churches, retail and leisure facilities, all designed to modern architectural and social standards with minimal municipal oversight. Planning and construction of the Siemens Railway were closely coordinated with Deutsche Reichsbahn and began in 1925 and 1927 respectively. Upon completion in 1929, Siemens handed ownership and control to Deutsche Reichsbahn for integration into the Berliner Stadt-, Ring- und Vorortbahnen ("Stadtbahn, Ringbahn and suburban railways") network. That newly electrified network was rebranded as the Berlin S-Bahn in 1930.

Towards the end of the Second World War, a bridge across the river Spree was destroyed, and one track subsequently removed as war reparations. By the time the line was fully restored in 1956, Siemens had relocated to Munich due to the division of Germany. Following the building of the Berlin Wall in 1961, the Deutsche Reichsbahn of East Germany remained in charge of a now bisected S-Bahn network. After decades of low ridership numbers and lack of investment, Siemensbahn fell into disuse in September 1980 when industrial action of East German railway personnel precipitated the abandonment of substantial portions of the West Berlin network. The Siemensbahn north of the Spree crossing, including bridges, viaducts and ancillary buildings, is listed for conservation as a historic technical ensemble with the Berlin State Historical Monument Office (Landesdenkmalamt Berlin).

== Description ==
Siemensbahn connected to the Berlin Ringbahn at the existing Jungfernheide station. That station was partly rebuilt with an improved platform arrangement designed to handle high volumes of passengers without delaying Ringbahn services during shift change. Trains would mostly continue onto the Ringbahn towards the center of Berlin, or terminate at Jungfernheide.

Terminating trains stopped twice: First at the northern platform edge of eastbound center platform "B" for unloading and easy cross-platform interchange to Ringbahn trains, and then the southern platform edge of westbound center platform "C" for reversing the train at a buffer stop while simultaneously loading new passengers.

Leaving the station in a western direction, the line passed under the westbound Ringbahn track and diverged north to cross the river Spree and continue onto an elevated alignment that is part steel viaduct, part on an embankment interspersed with steel or concrete road bridges.

The first intermediate station was Wernerwerk halt. Beyond Wernerwerk, the line curves to the west at a wide angle. Just before the next halt, Siemensstadt, the line begins a turn in a north-western direction. Beyond Siemensstadt halt, the line gradually descends to grade level. The single center platform of the Gartenfeld terminus was built mindful of a potential future extension of the line. Spanning some of the 1 km distance between Siemensstadt and Gartenfeld stations is a yard with six tail tracks that, in the early years, provided terminal and stabling capacity for up to twelve rush-hour trains, but was repeatedly scaled down in the following decades.

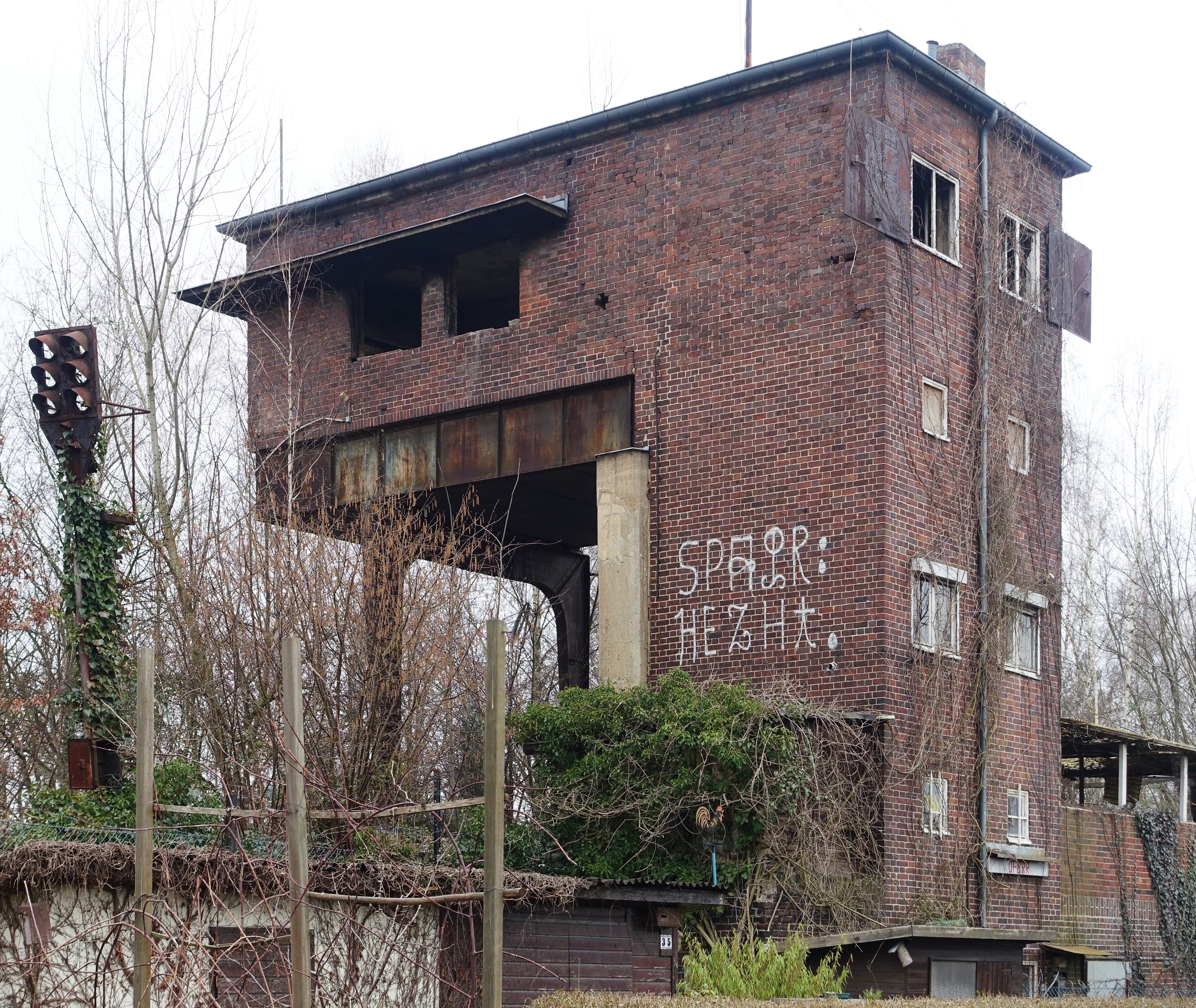
Derelict signal box "Gtf" at Gartenfeld

The interlocking at the terminus and yard was controlled from a gantry-style, brick-clad signal box with the designation "Gtf" (mnemonic for Gartenfeld). The electro-mechanical interlocking with multi-aspect colour light signals implemented automated and semi-automated modes to enable dense traffic of up to 24 trains per hour and direction (150-second theoretical headway). Colour light signalling can be more flexible and require less maintenance than semaphore signals but only became practical to use after the exhaust from steam locomotives no longer posed a risk of obscuring sightlines, so the electrified Siemensbahn was one of the first lines to be equipped that way. The interlocking was produced by Vereinigte Eisenbahn-Signalwerke (VES), a joint venture of Siemens & Halske's own railway equipment company with Allgemeine Elektricitäts-Gesellschaft (AEG) and Eisenbahnsignal-Bauanstalten Max Jüdel, Stahmer, Bruchsal.

In the years after train traffic abruptly ceased in September 1980, some station buildings continued to see intermittent commercial or retail occupancy. Until 2012, the grounds and buildings at Gartenfeld station were used by a garden center.

== History ==
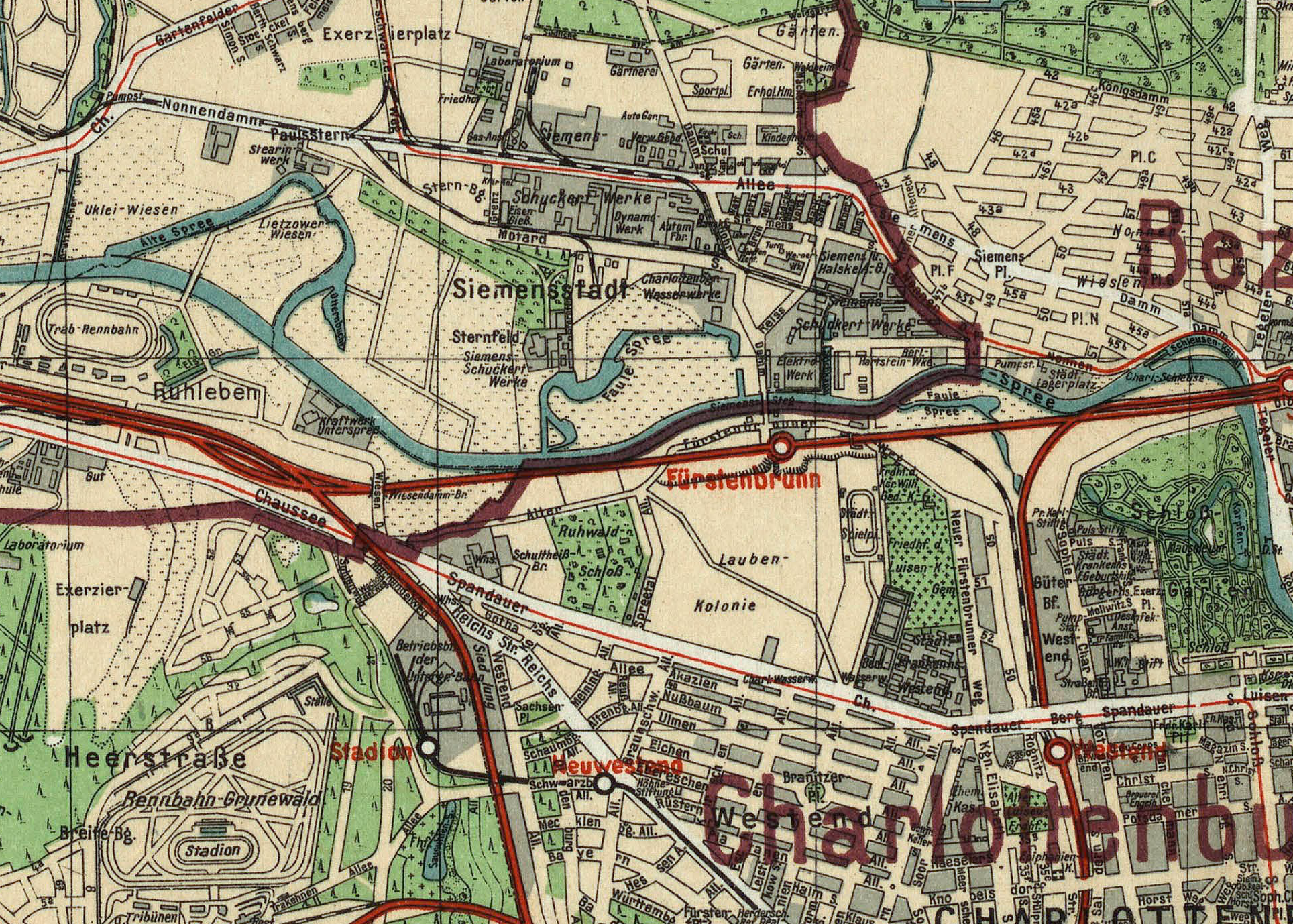
1925 map of Siemensstadt (top) and its industrial railway. The state railway at Fürstenbrunn station provides passenger access. No trace yet of the future Siemens Railway.

In 1905, the Siemens group had its own train station set up for its employees so that they could get to work faster. The station opened on the Berlin–Hamburg Railway as Fürstenbrunn (renamed to Siemensstadt-Fürstenbrunn in 1925) and initially saw high passenger numbers despite its less than ideal location beyond the southern edge of Siemensstadt. As the main manufacturing zone at Siemensstadt was expanded northwards in the 1920s, the management was looking for a better solution. In 1925 Siemens and the Deutsche Reichsbahn Gesellschaft (DRG) agreed to build a new line.

Siemens Bauunion, a subsidiary formed by Siemens & Halske and Siemens-Schuckert to handle construction projects in-house, built the line and the stations. Siemens contributed the right-of-way. The Reichsbahn was to operate the train service. This arrangement was possible because CEO Carl Friedrich von Siemens also served as President of the Board of Directors of the DRG.

Map indicating progress of the "Grand Electrification" by 1930. Siemens railway top of center left. Red: newly electrified S-Bahn lines, green: steam traction

Construction began in 1927 and was completed in two years. The trains were electric; the "Grand Electrification" (German: "Große Elektrisierung"), the wholesale conversion of the existing Berlin city, ring and suburban railways from steam engines to third rail powered DC traction, was in full swing at the time. On December 18, 1929, passenger service began. In the early years, trains ran every five minutes to inner-city stations like Neukölln or Papestrasse. Siemens had roughly 90,000 employees at Siemensstadt at the time, with around 17,000 of them using the S-Bahn.

A large-scale urban development plan by Albert Speer was to include a transfer station at the end of the line.

The line was damaged in the Second World War. The Spree bridge just beyond the junction was destroyed but a temporary bridge was in place by September 17, 1945. The Wehrmacht had demolished the Siemens industrial railway's own Spree bridges, so Soviet engineers connected the industrial railway to the Gartenfeld S-Bahn station via a wooden ramp. The second track was delivered to the Soviet Union as a reparation payment. Until April 28, 1948, freight traffic took place on the single remaining S-Bahn track, predominantly at night. The provisional connection was retained until March 1950 because Siemens repaired S-Bahn cars for the Deutsche Reichsbahn.

The Siemens group relocated its headquarters to Munich in 1948. Some production lines had already been moved, generally to West Germany, starting in 1942 to escape the impact of the war. The 1970s saw closures and demolitions of factories.

Double track operation was restored on December 3, 1956 after completion of a new Spree bridge. The line became one of the least used in the entire Berlin S-Bahn network. Short consists of mostly older DRG Class ET 168 and DRG Class ET 165 series units were used for a shuttle train service. In the final years, trains ran every 20 minutes and carried 30 to 40 passengers. One platform at Jungfernheide station was permanently closed in the 1970s, so trains terminated at Beusselstrasse, the next station to the east.

== Closing ==
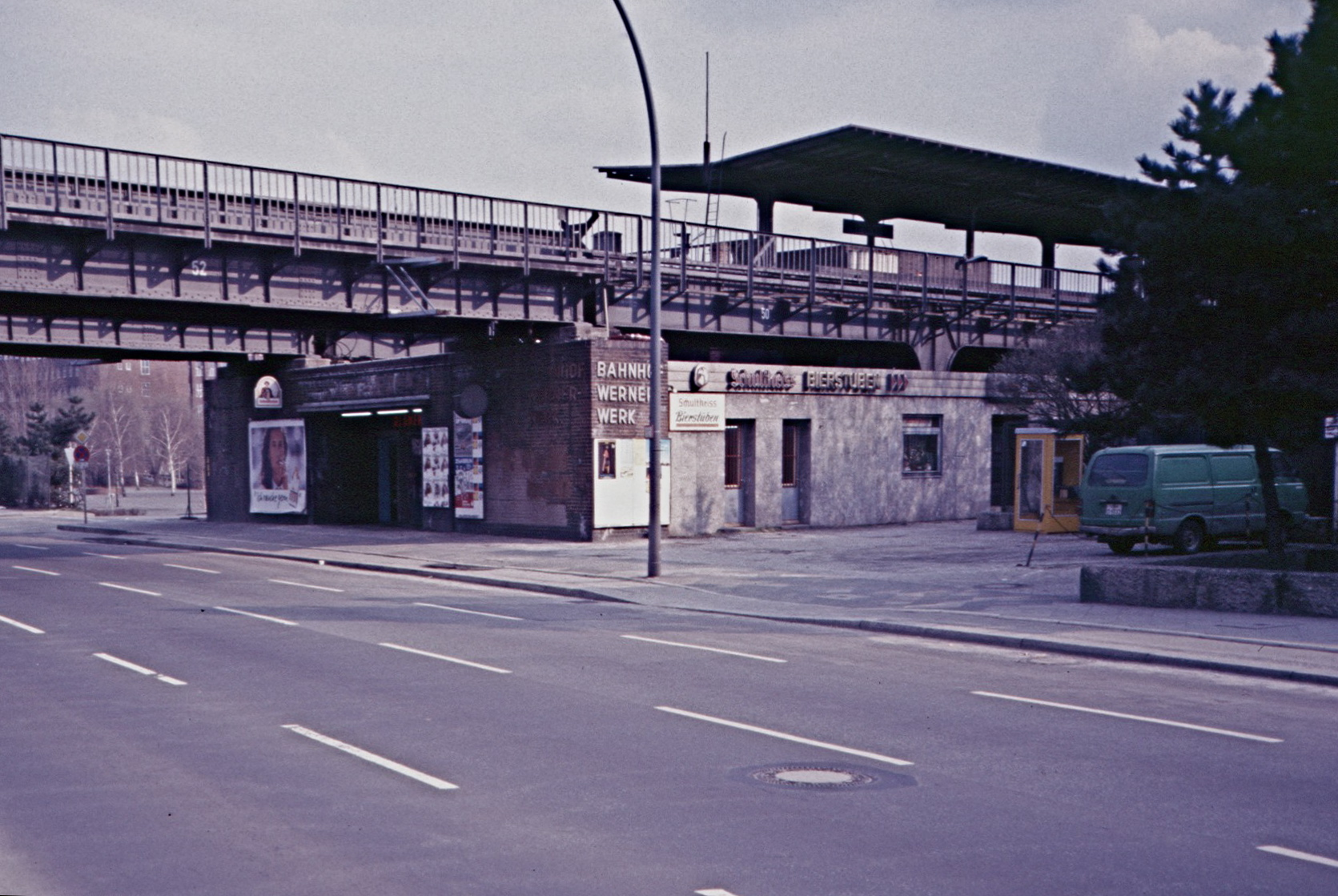
Wernerwerk station (1987)

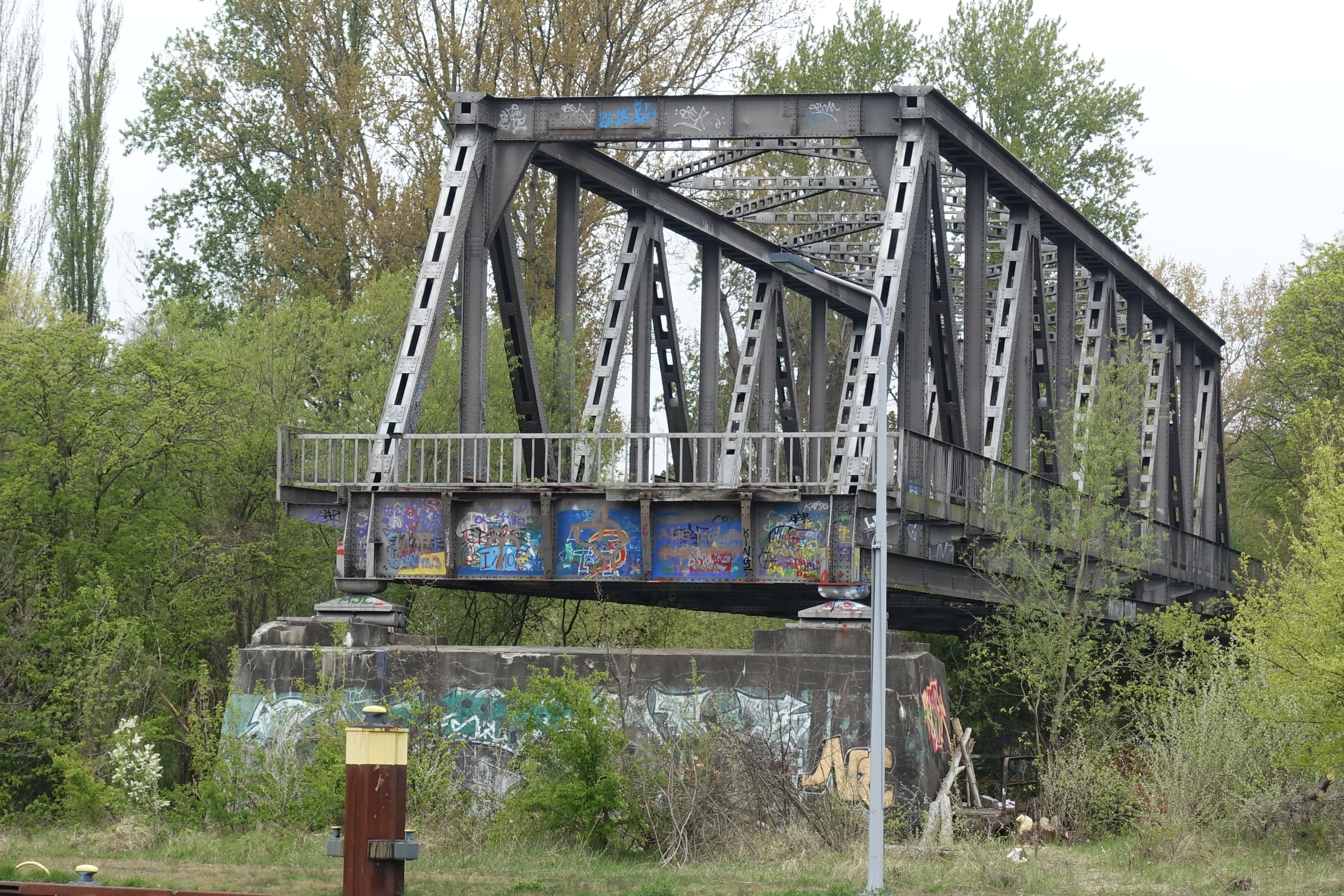
Severed Spree railway bridge sitting disused (2017)

The dismal financial outlook of Deutsche Reichsbahn's operations in West Berlin led to plans of imminent service cuts with worsening conditions for the railway workers. They reacted to the plans by going on strike in September 1980. Only half of the S-Bahn routes went back in service afterwards. This drew the public's attention to a state of affairs that had been left unresolved and untenable for too long. Effective 1984, operations of the West Berlin S-Bahn were, with approval by the Allied powers, transferred from the Reichsbahn to Berliner Verkehrsbetriebe BVG, West Berlin's municipal public transit company.

The Berliner Verkehrsbetriebe had its work cut out to modernize the three most important S-Bahn lines. The city was not interested in reviving an insignificant branch line in close proximity to one of BVG's newest U-Bahn lines. U-Bahn line U7 had been extended to Siemensstadt in October 1980, was fast and modern and offered direct links to many relevant areas of West Berlin. Jungfernheide U-Bahn station opened at right angles below the dormant Jungfernheide S-Bahn station, Siemensdamm U-Bahn station was within walking distance of Wernerwerk station, and Rohrdamm U-Bahn station of Siemensstadt station. The U7 was extended to the center of Spandau in 1984.

After German reunification, the federal government made a commitment to rebuilding the S-Bahn network to its 1961 state, but Siemensbahn was not included in that plan. The line had become a non-entity in the minds of planners, and no provisions were made for a potential future reactivation.

In August 1995, the section of the line between the district border to Spandau and the Gartenfeld station was listed.

In 2005, when building the Charlottenburg lock, the Wasser- und Schifffahrtsamt (Federal Waterways and Shipping Authority) had the course of the river Spree altered, partially removing the railway embankment between the junction of the Ringbahn and the southern bank of the Spree and demolishing the foreland bridge of the Spree bridge. Nothing was predetermined with regards to apportioning the costs of any future replacement Spree bridge.

In 2007, Deutsche Bahn, as successor to Deutsche Reichsbahn, intended to rid itself of maintenance costs of the derelict line and placed a decommissioning request with the Federal Railway Authority. After decommissioning, the railway land would have reverted to Siemens' ownership and the alignment no longer been safeguarded, rendering any future reactivation plans moot. The Senate of Berlin successfully intervened to retain the ability to access future housing developments. Negotiations between private rail infrastructure company Deutsche Regionaleisenbahn and Deutsche Bahn in 2008 to take over the alignment between Wernerwerk and Gartenfeld went nowhere. Deutsche Bahn, or the districts of Spandau and Charlottenburg-Wilmersdorf in which the railway line runs, carried out some maintenance work at the decaying and overgrown tracks and structures. Deutsche Bahn estimated the costs for securing the line to be 500,000 EUR annually. Later on, it estimated the expenses for three years (2013–2015) to have amounted to 133,000 EUR.

== Reactivation and expansion plans ==
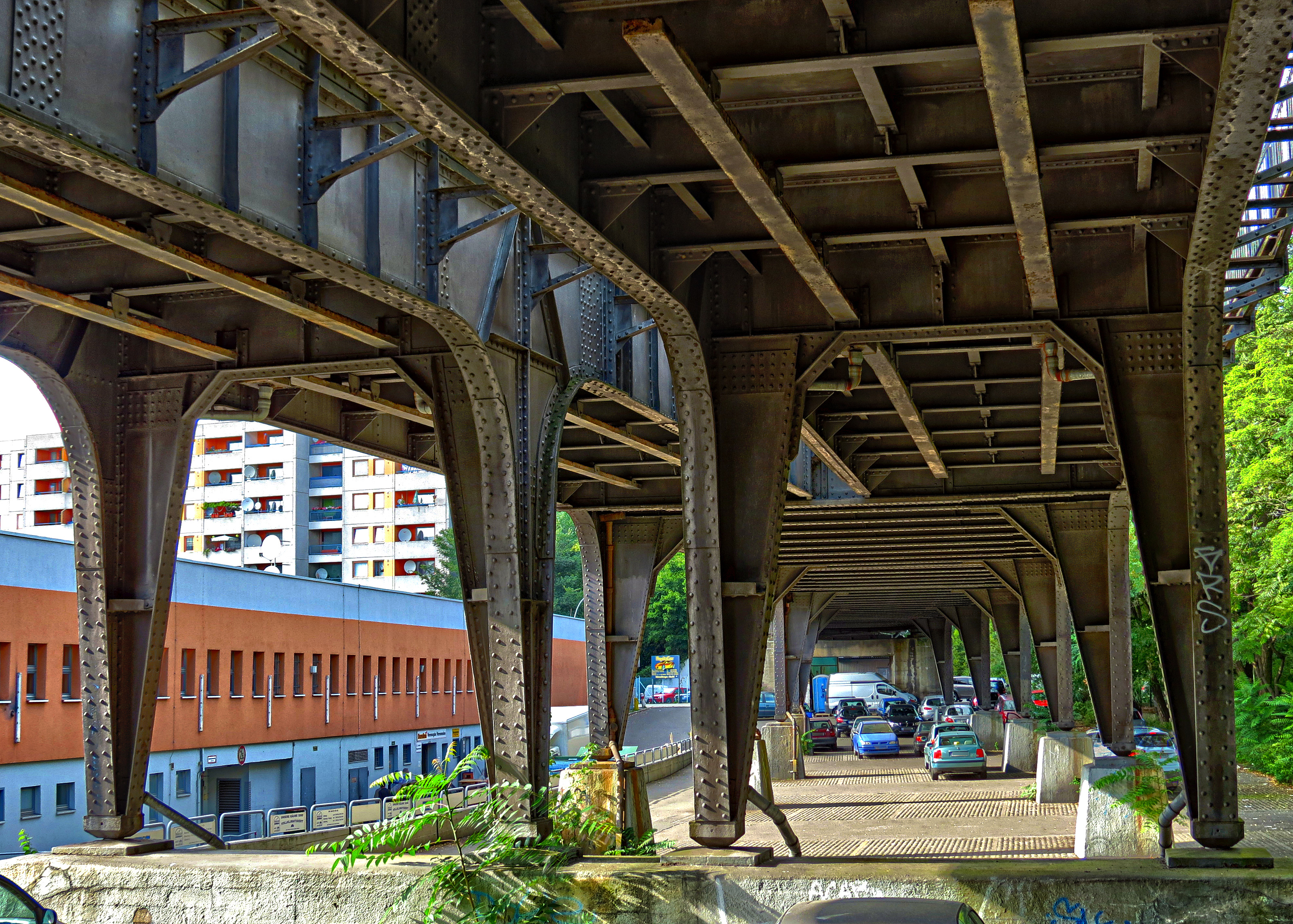
Under the steel viaduct near Siemensdamm (2012)

In 2014, the architect and lecturer at the Stuttgart Technology University of Applied Sciences, Rebecca Chestnutt-Niess, worked with students to develop designs for potential use. Inspired by the Landschaftspark Duisburg-Nord and New York City's successful High Line, the re-urbanization project included ideas for a foot and cycle path, a swimming lane on a section of the Siemensbahn and the partial greening of the viaduct.

The Siemensbahn continues to be included in the Berlin land use and zoning plan last updated in November 2017. It reserves a right-of-way for a possible extension beyond Gartenfeld via Daumstrasse (Wasserstadt Oberhavel) to Hakenfelde. The route would run along the old Berlin-Spandau Ship Canal, through a beaver preserve and parallel to Rhenaniastraße to a new Daumstrasse station and then across the river Havel to a new terminus at Streitstrasse, south of the Goltzstrasse intersection in Hakenfelde. In the course of the early public consultation regarding the "Neues Gartenfeld" housing estate, the Senate unveiled plans that would deviate from the land use plan: The Gartenfeld island would be crossed underground and the route run north along the Rohrbruchteich to Daumstrasse. According to this plan, the Gartenfeld station would be relocated to the Gartenfeld island.

In October 2018, Siemens AG announced its intention to build a campus in Siemensstadt for research purposes. The company and the Senate spoke out in favor of reactivating the Siemensbahn. In light of further expansion of the Wasserstadt and new construction on the island of Gartenfeld, they saw an increased urgency to reactivation of the Siemens Railway. The Berlin Senate would have liked to see it reactivated by 2025. The reconstruction was subsequently included in the "i2030" common transport planning framework of the two federal states of Berlin and Brandenburg and Deutsche Bahn. In November 2019, DB Netz AG issued a Europe-wide tender for the creation of a feasibility study for a second construction phase, Gartenfeld to Hakenfelde. The study includes various route options for a two-track extension for a maximum speed of 100 km/h with the intermediate stops "Gartenfeld", "Wasserstadt Oberhavel" and "Hakenfelde". In 2020, some of the overgrown right-of-way was cleared of vegetation, and rails and sleepers were removed.

Construction of the Siemensstadt Square mixed-use development — intended to create approximately 20,000 jobs and 7,000 apartments by 2035 — officially began in June 2024, lending new urgency to the Siemensbahn reactivation. In preparation for construction, the Berlin Senate invested approximately 36 million euros in preliminary work including environmental surveys, measurement, and ordnance clearance along the former alignment.

In July 2025, the board of DB InfraGO signed financing agreements covering all planning costs through phase 5 (Leistungsphasen 1–5), providing the project with financial certainty for the coming years of detailed planning. In September 2025, Deutsche Bahn announced a construction alliance of nine firms across five contract packages, described as the first application of the "Partnerschaftsmodell Schiene" (Rail partnership model) in eastern Germany. Obermeyer Group and Schüßler Plan were awarded the planning package; Porr, Kemna Bau and MCE the new-construction structural engineering package; and Eiffage SEH Engineering, Eiffage STC and Leonhard Weiss the structural repair package covering existing infrastructure. The cooperative model is intended to ensure on-time and on-budget delivery through shared responsibility among partners.

The project was awarded the BIM Champions Award 2025 in the planning category, recognising the use of building information modelling (BIM) methodology throughout the design process. Construction is scheduled to begin on 14 August 2026, with revenue service planned to commence on 20 December 2029 — the centenary of the line's original opening. The scope of work includes rehabilitation of the steel viaduct in Spandau, construction of a new Spree bridge, renewal of approximately 10 km of track, renovation or replacement of around 30 bridges, and modernisation of three stations to meet current accessibility standards. Up to 40,000 daily passengers are anticipated upon reopening.

A conflict arose with DEGES over the planned A100 motorway extension, whose support columns west of Jungfernheide station would have required excavation of the Siemensbahn embankment after 2026. Deutsche Bahn stated it was prepared to pursue legal action against the DEGES planning approval process, as the Siemensbahn reactivation had not been taken into account. The dispute was subsequently resolved, allowing construction to proceed as planned.

In April 2026, Deutsche Bahn held a public information evening at the former Siemens-Turm near Wernerwerk station, drawing approximately 200 residents. Topics included construction schedules, timelines and noise protection measures. No binding plans exist for an extension beyond Gartenfeld to Hakenfelde; results of the feasibility study tendered in 2019 have not been published as of 2026.

== Literature ==
- Bernhard Strowitzki: S-Bahn Berlin – Geschichte(n) für unterwegs. GVE-Verlag, Berlin 2002. ISBN 3-89218-073-3.
- Die neue Siemensbahn / Bahnhöfe Jungfernheide – Wernerwerk – Siemensstadt – Gartenfeld. In: Deutsche Bauzeitung, Jg. 63, 1929, S. 865–873.

== See also ==
- Siemens Industrial Railway (former freight line serving Siemensstadt, distinct from the passenger Siemens Railway)
