= Hohenzollern Canal =

Hohenzollern Canal, or Hohenzollernkanal, may refer to:

- Berlin-Spandau Ship Canal, built between 1848 and 1859
- Oder–Havel Canal, built between 1908 and 1914
