= Westhafen =

Port in Berlin

Coordinates: 52.537°N 13.334°E

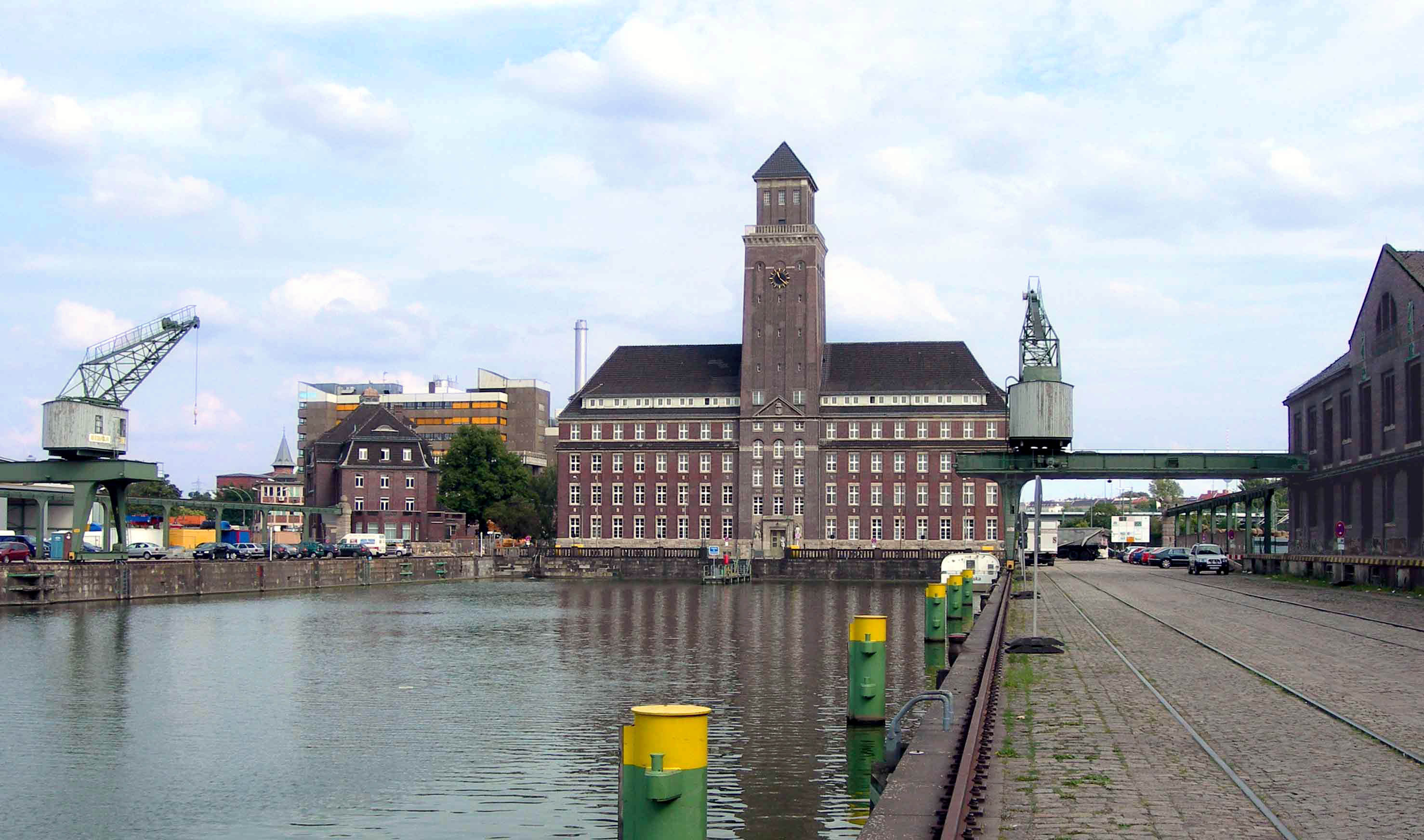
BEHALA administration building with its 52-meter high tower

The Westhafen (German for West Harbor) is Berlin's largest inland port, located in the district of Moabit.

The Westhafen has an area of 430,000 square meters and it is divided into two parallel harbor basins. It is connected to the Spree and Havel rivers via the Westhafen Canal and the Berlin-Spandau Shipping Canal (known as the Hohenzollern Canal) and is thus integrated into the supraregional waterway network between the Elbe and Oder rivers. The Westhafen is a transhipment and storage site for inland shipping with a growing importance. For the onward transport of goods by rail, it is connected to the Berlin ring railroad, the Hamburg and Lehrter freight yards and the Moabit freight yard. Goods are transported in and out by truck via the A 100 city highway. The Westhafen and Beusselstraße train and U-Bahn stations provide public transportation.

The Westhafen was founded in 1923, when the BEHALA (Berliner Hafen- und Lagerhaus AG) was also founded as its operating company. On September 3 of the same year, a first section of the harbor was inaugurated. Some of the BEHALA buildings originating from 1920s were later added to the list of Berlin monuments.
