= Berlin Beusselstraße station =

Railway station in Berlin, Germany

Beusselstraße
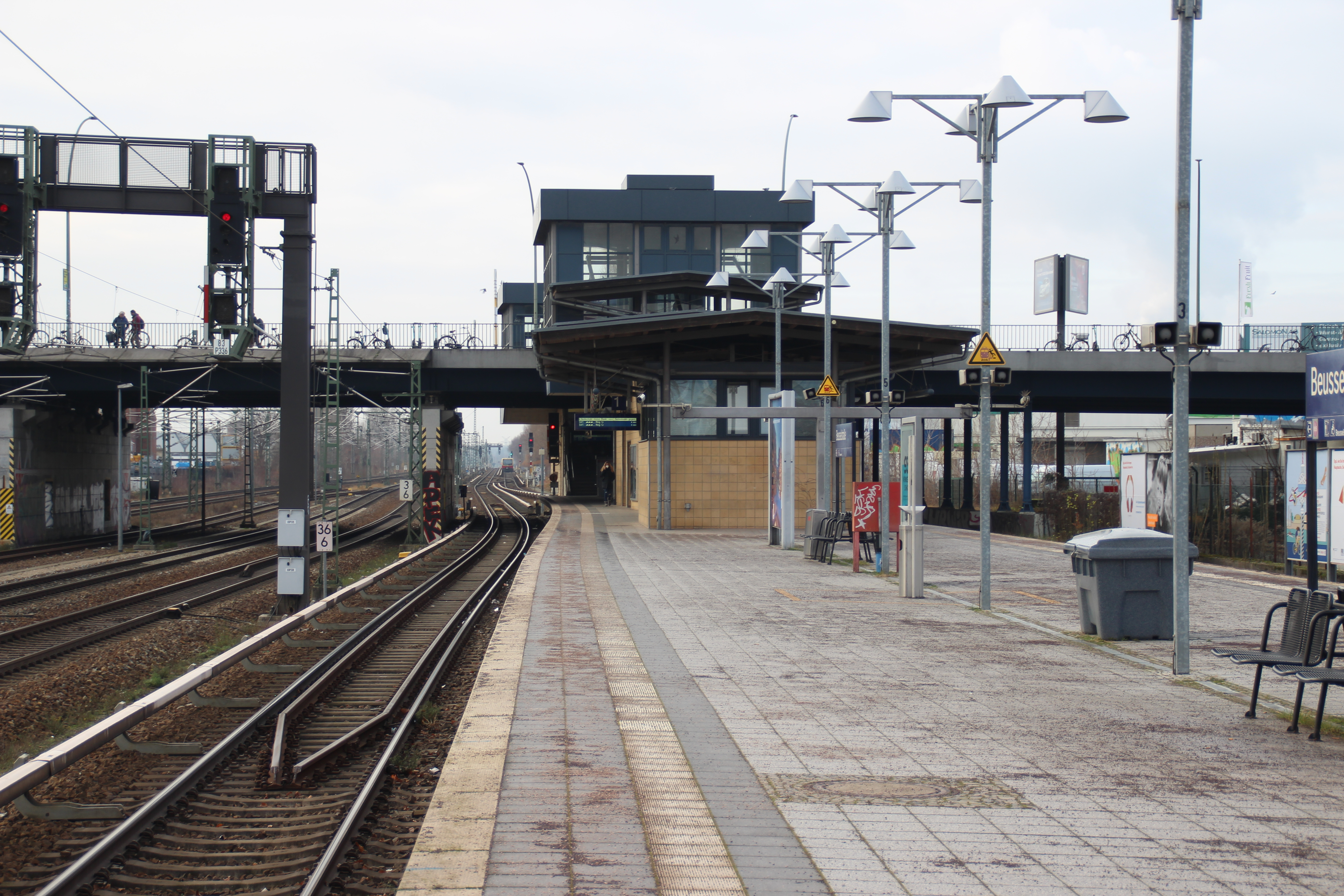
- 2021

General information
- Location: Beusselbrücke, Moabit, Berlin; Germany
- Coordinates: 52°32′04″N 13°19′46″E
- Line: Berlin Ringbahn S46
- Platforms: 2 (S-Bahn)

Construction
- Accessible: Yes

Other information
- Station code: 7726
- DS100 code: BBEU
- IBNR: 8089118
- Category: 4
- Fare zone: VBB: Berlin A/5555
- Website: www.bahnhof.de

History
- Opened: 1 May 1894; 19 December 1999
- Closed: 18 September 1980

Services
Preceding station	Berlin S-Bahn	Following station
Jungfernheide One-way operation	S41	Westhafen Ringbahn (clockwise)
Jungfernheide Ringbahn (counter-clockwise)	S42	Westhafen One-way operation
Location

Beusselstraße is a Berlin S-Bahn station in the Moabit district in the Mitte borough of Berlin. It is located at the Beussel bridge, which carries the street of Beusselstrasse over the Berlin Ringbahn. It is served by the S-Bahn lines S41 and S42. It is additionally served by the line S46 on weekends.

== History ==
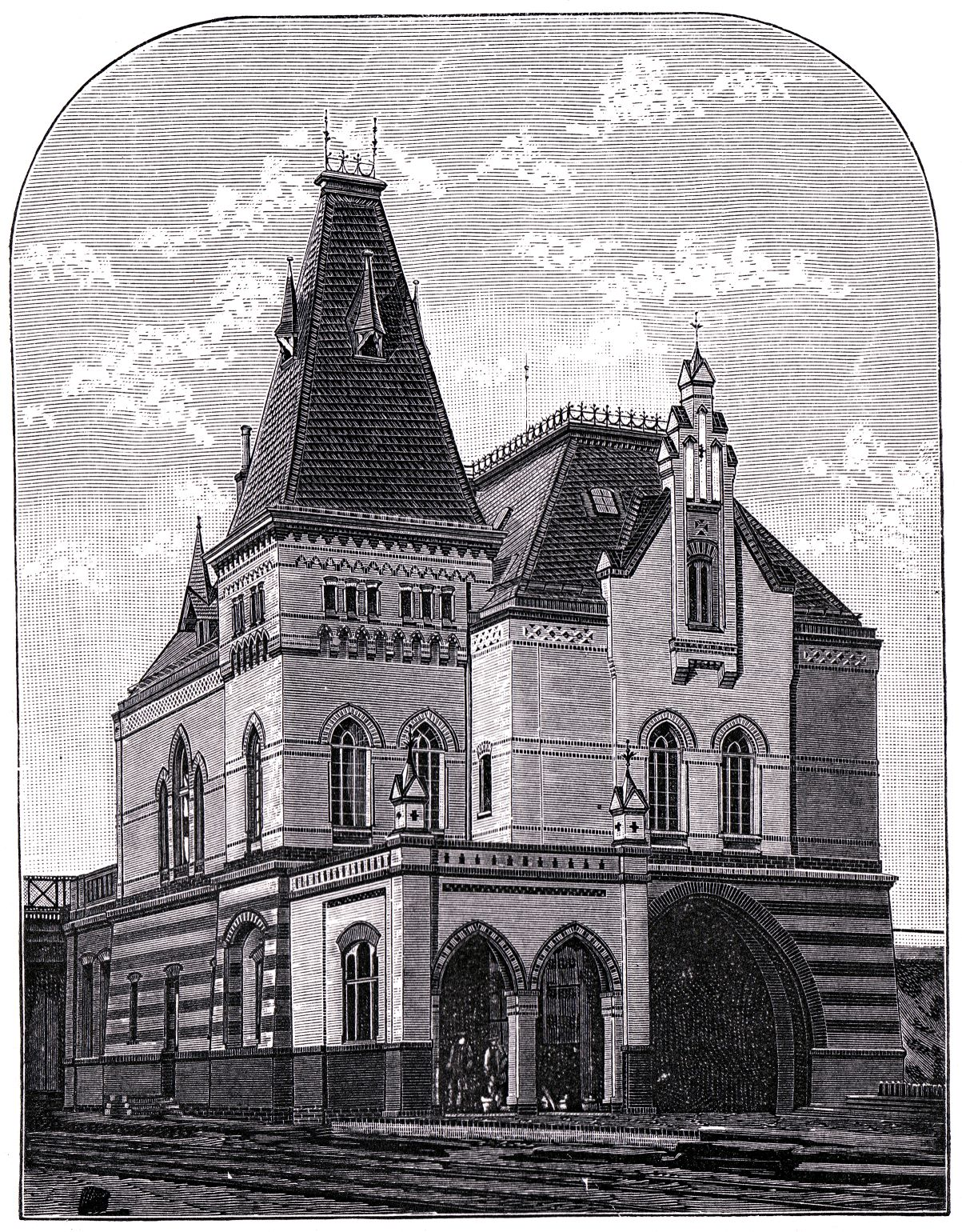
View of the station in 1894

From the opening of the first section of the Verbindungsbahn (connecting railway, later called the Ringbahn, "Ring Railway") on 1 January 1872, there was a station that was a little further to the east than the current Moabit freight yard. This marked the beginning of the connecting railway and is still the zero point of the line chainage (distance marks) applied to the Ringbahn. Due to the growing patronage, the station was completely rebuilt in the early 1890s. Passenger and freight traffic were separated. The new Beusselstraße station was opened for passenger services at the Beussel bridge on 1 May 1894 and Moabit station became a freight yard only on that day.

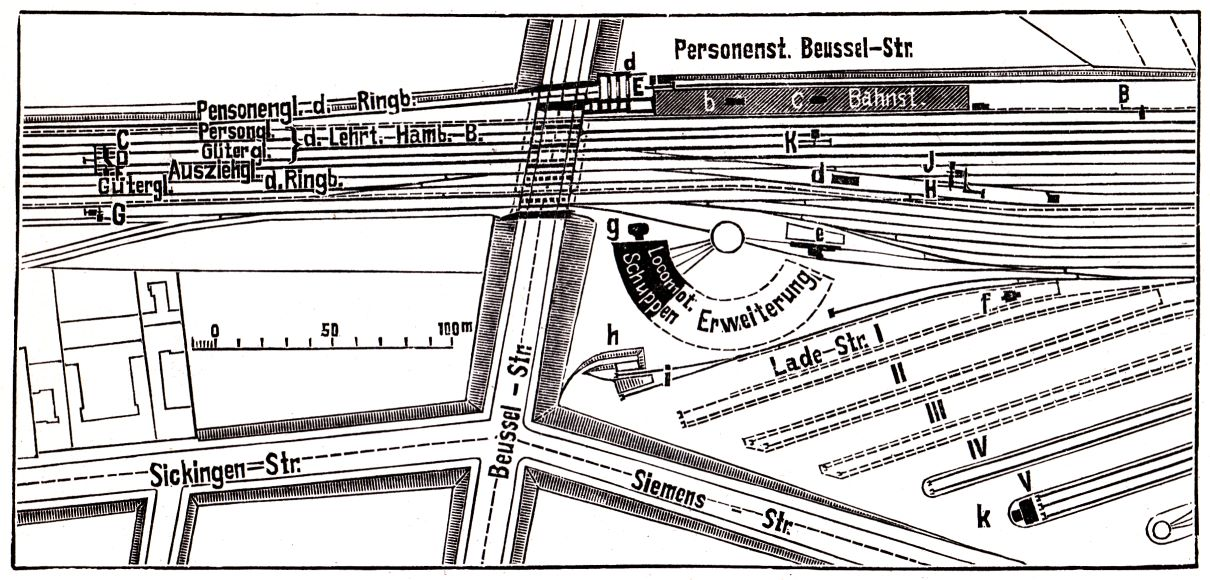
Location in 1894

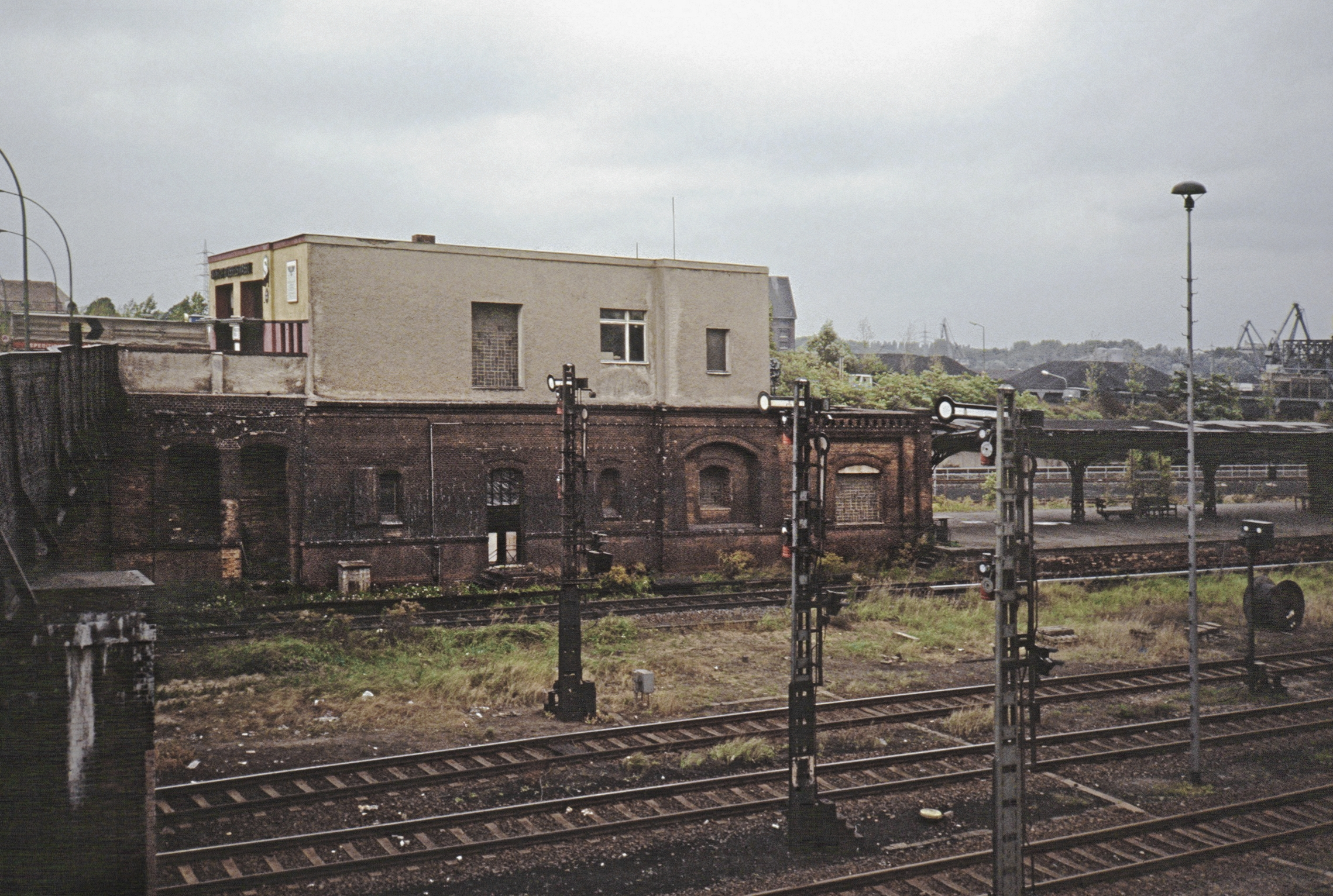
Entrance building and platform in 1988

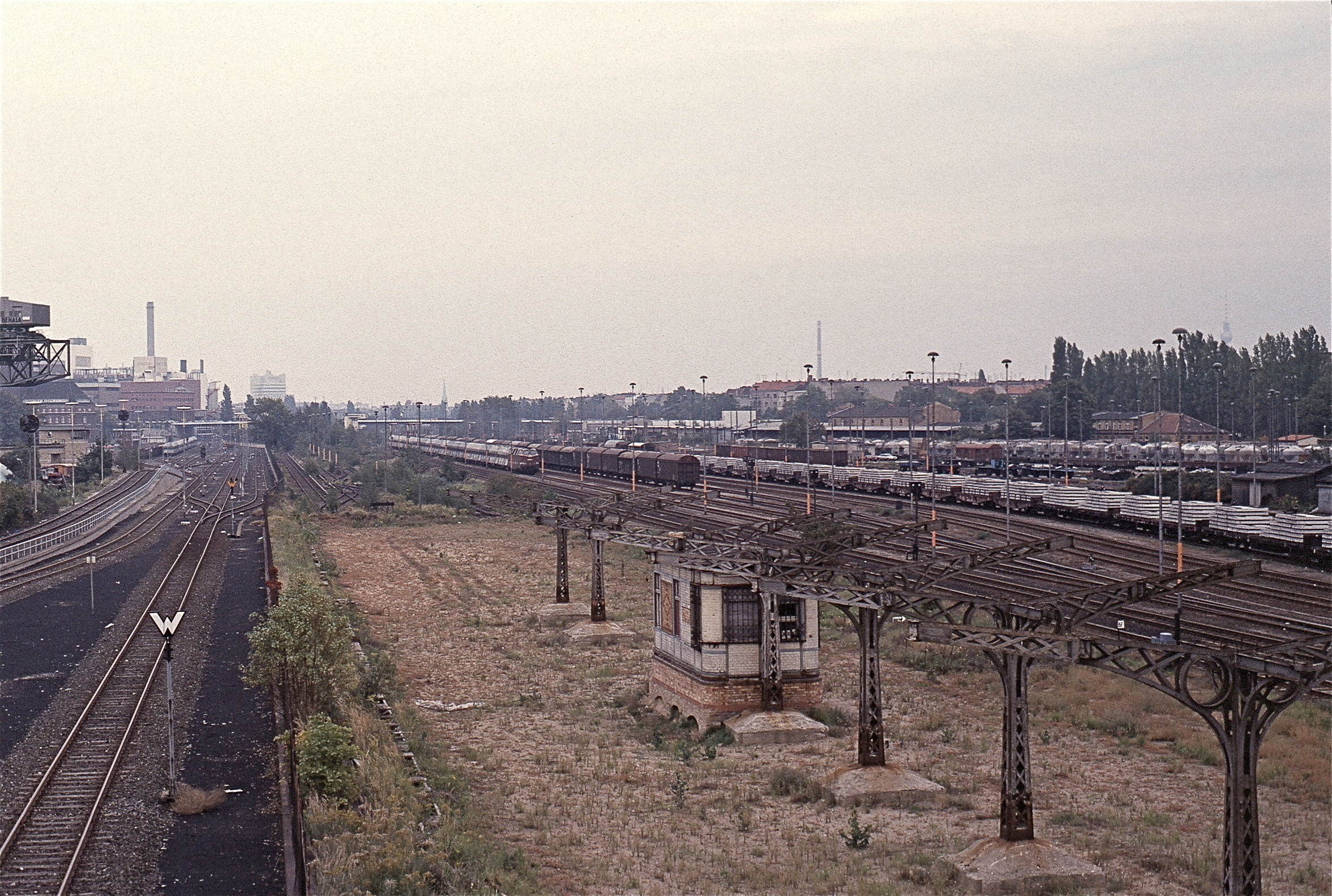
Partially dismantled platform, Moabit freight yard on the right, 1992

The form of Beusselstraße station could be described as a typical Ringbahn stations. The station had an island platform and two entrances. One was at the end of the platform at the Beussel bridge and the other was at the centre of the platform and had an entrance from the north side. It had a roof supported by a row of iron trusses. The station building was built on the bridge in Gothic Revival style. In the first decades it was served by trains hauled by steam locomotives. As part of the "Great electrification", it was served by new railcars of the “Stadtbahn” class (ET 165) from 1 February 1929.

The Nazis’ plan of the 1930s to transform Berlin into World Capital Germania would have included extensive work on the northern Ringbahn. All suburban traffic on this section of the Ringbahn would have been moved from the outside to the inside of the Ringbahn to be consistent with the rest of the line. Moreover, a so-called "long-distance S-Bahn" was planned between the new Northern station (Nordbahnhof, between Westhafen and Wedding) and Siemensstadt-Fürstenbrunn. Trains on this line would have stopped at an island platform at Beusselstraße station. North of the suburban lines the freight yard would have also been extended to supply the Berlin wholesale market at Westhafen. The outbreak of the Second World War prevented the execution of these plans.

The station building was extensively damaged by Allied air raids in the Second World War. It was demolished in 1962 and replaced by a low-rise entrance structure. The second entrance, the so-called Gewächshausgang (“greenhouse entrance") glazed pedestrian bridge was also removed.

In the 1970s, the station was the terminus of services from Spandau and Gartenfeld (terminus of the now closed Siemens Railway). As a result of the closure of a platform at the more westerly Jungfernheide station, stopping trains could no longer reverse there, so trains continued to Beusselstraße and reversed at its reversing facility.

On 17 September 1980, as a result of a strike by West Berlin-based workers of Deutsche Reichsbahn, the entire S-Bahn network in West Berlin was closed. The infrastructure remained in its original condition until 1984 when the Berlin Fahrgastverband (passenger association), which was also established in 1980, moved into the entrance building and established a passenger centre. Four years later, however, this had to leave the site so that the Beussel bridge could be demolished as the building stood in the way. In addition to this, a large part of the platform facilities were removed. Only fragments of the columns and the station master’s house had been preserved in 1991.

To restore the northern Ringbahn to service, it was initially planned to integrate the surviving columns in the new station. It was then decided, however, to carry out a complete reconstruction so that the new platform would be moved under Beussel bridge in order to create entrances on both sides of the bridge. The Jungfernheide–Beusselstrasse–Westhafen section was formally re-opened on 19 December 1999 with the participation of the Governing Mayor Eberhard Diepgen.

A two-track reversing facility was re-established to the east of the platform in the mid-2010s. A crossover had already been installed to the west of the platform at its opening in 1999.

== Berlin-Moabit freight yard ==
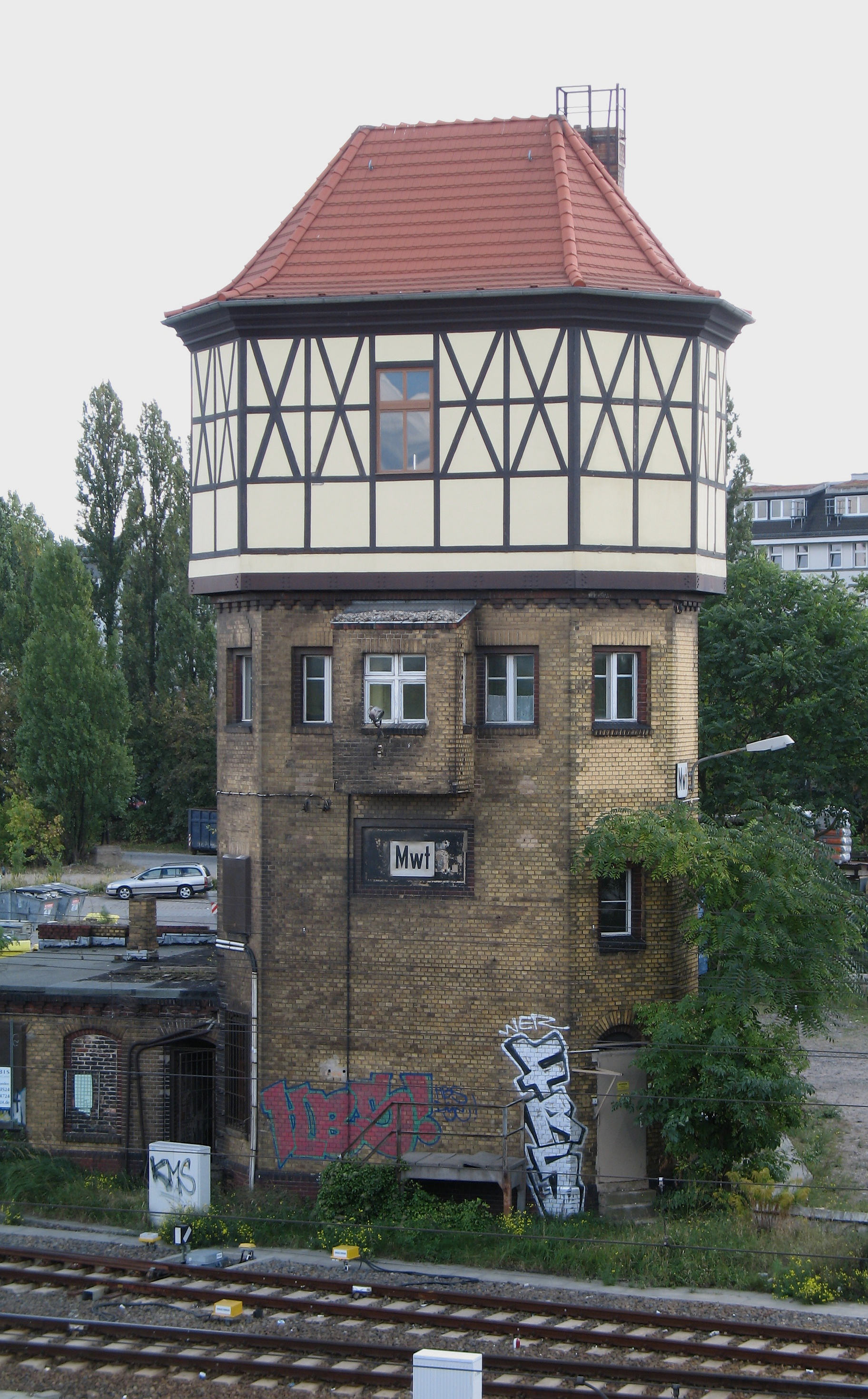
The former water tower with signalbox Mwt (Moabit west tower)

South of the S-Bahn tracks between Beussel bridge and Putlitz bridge is the Berlin-Moabit freight yard. It extends to the east past Putlitz bridge. Its sidings and loading tracks formerly extended south to the streets of Siemensstraße and Quitzowstraße and are now largely dismantled.

During Nazi Germany, about 30,000 Jews were deported from Moabit freight yard. Today this is commemorated by a memorial on the Putlitz bridge and a plaque in Quitzowstraße, where a memorial will be established during the redevelopment of the area.

Large parts of the freight yard were abandoned after 1990. The southern part of the yard is being redeveloped for such uses as wholesale marketing. The street of Erna-Samuel-Straße has been constructed for the development of the site; it also relieves the southern residential areas of through traffic.

The Moabiter Stadtgarten (“Moabit city garden”) was opened on 24 September 2012 on a 15,000 square metre section of this area; it consists of a playground, lawn areas, orchard and a citizens’ garden. €2 million was invested by the state of Berlin in this as part of the Stadtumbau West ("Urban Redevelopment West") project. Parts of a freight shed were incorporated in the park and they are intended for reuse.

The remaining tracks of the Moabit freight yard are now used in particular to connect with the Westhafen port (west harbour) and the Moabit power station via a headshunt at the former Hamburg-Lehrter freight yard.

The Mwt signalbox, designed by Karl Cornelius and built in 1892 and 1893 along with its integrated water tower is now heritage listed.

== Connections ==
The S-Bahn station is served by Ringbahn lines S41 and S42. It is possible to change to the bus lines of Berliner Verkehrsbetriebe. There is an express bus link between this station and Tegel Airport.
