= Westhafen Canal =

Canal in Berlin, Germany

Coordinates: 52°32′05″N 13°18′24″E

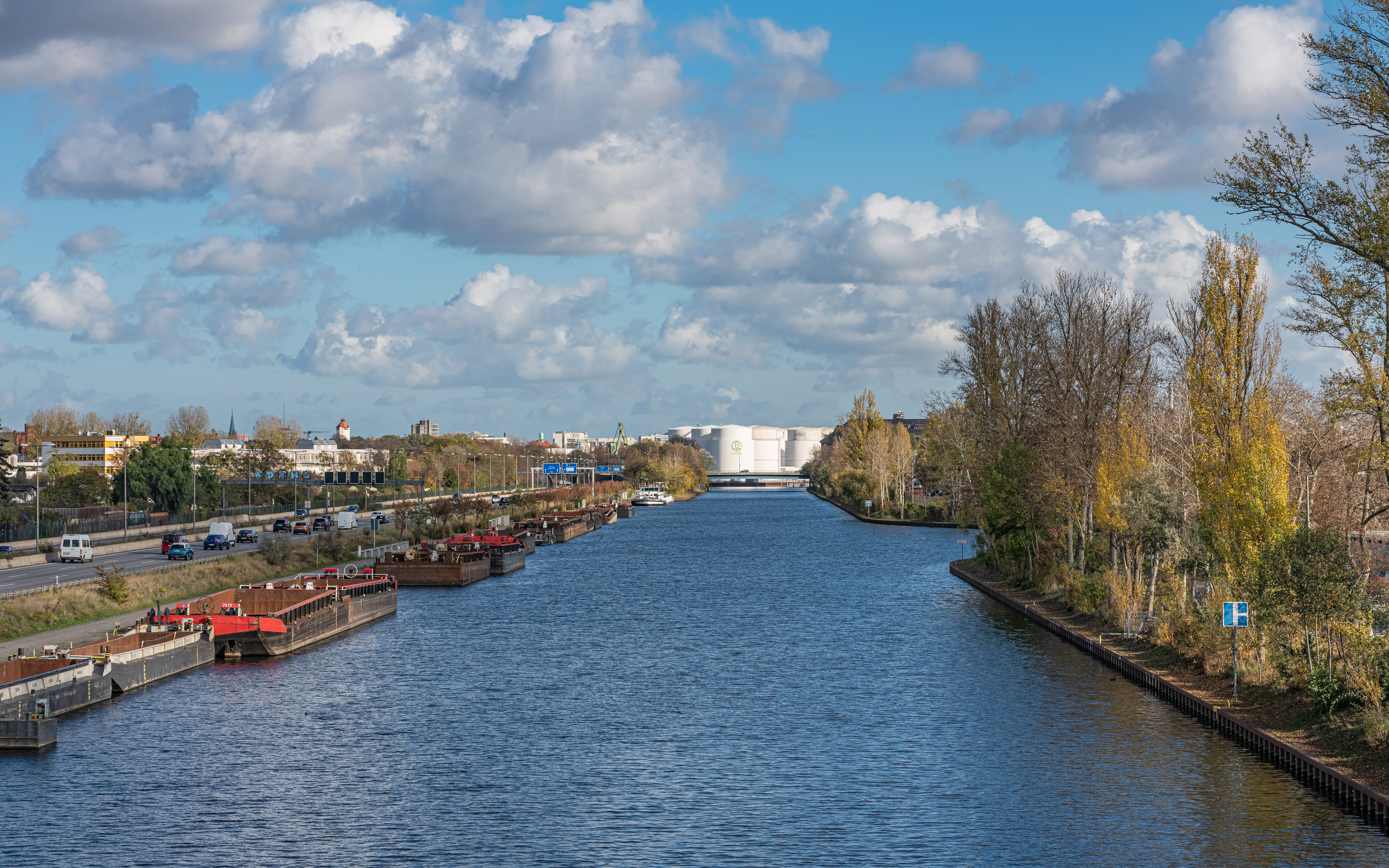
- Westhafen Canal
- Interactive map of Westhafen Canal

Specifications
- Length: 3.1 km (1.9 miles)

History
- Construction began: 1938
- Date completed: 1956

Geography
- Start point: Westhafen inland port, Berlin-Spandau Ship Canal
- End point: River Spree in Charlottenburg

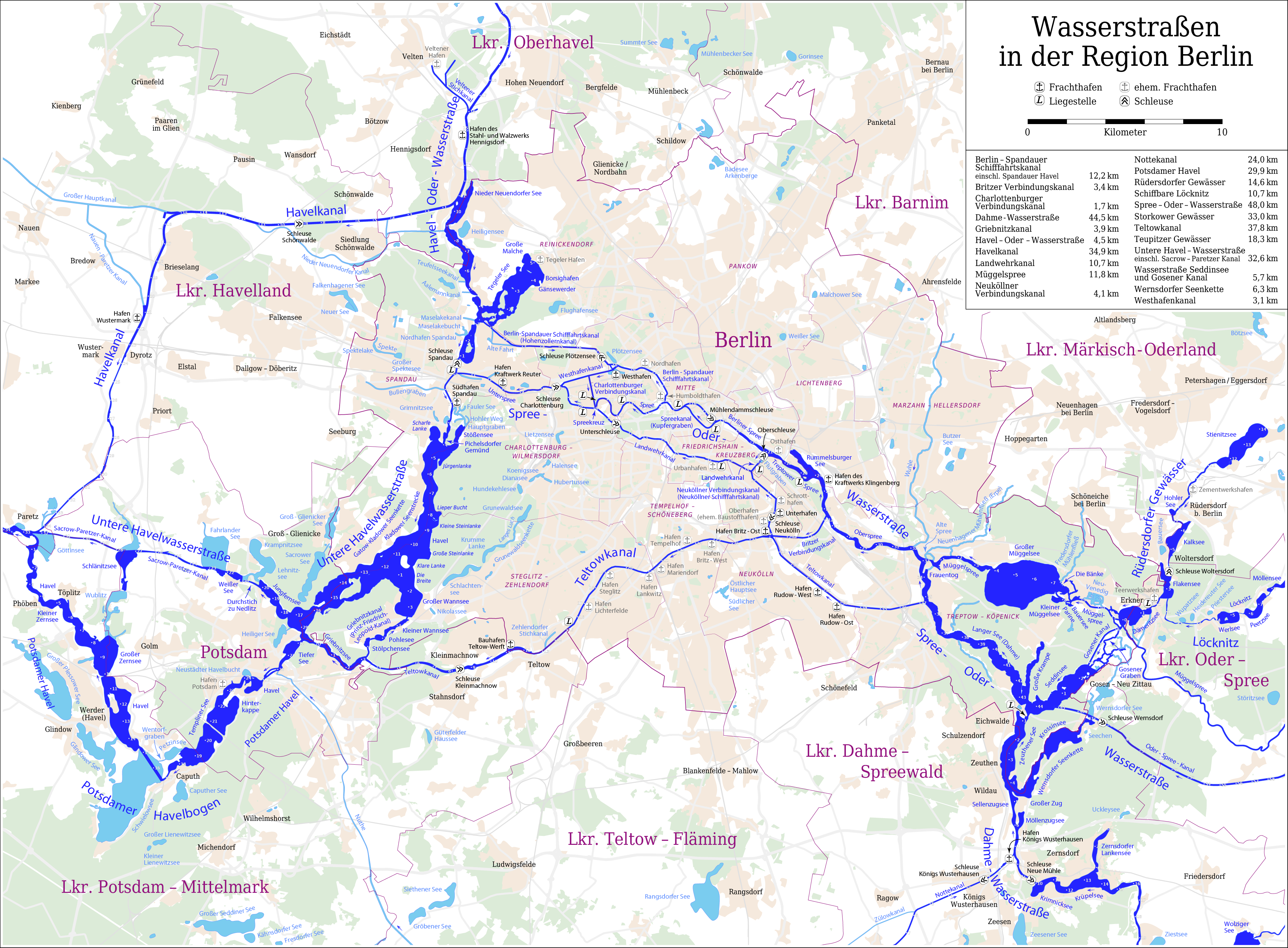
Map of waterways in the Berlin region

The Westhafen Canal, or Westhafenkanal in German, is a canal in Berlin, Germany. The 3.1-kilometre (1.9 mi) long canal connects with the Westhafen inland port and the Berlin-Spandau Ship Canal at its eastern end, and with the River Spree in Charlottenburg at its western end. It has no locks.

Construction was begun in 1938, but was interrupted by the Second World War, and only completed between 1954 and 1956. The Westhafen Canal partially replaces the Charlottenburg Canal, which provided an earlier connection between the Berlin-Spandau Ship Canal and the River Spree. The section of the Charlottenburg Canal that paralleled the Westhafen Canal has since been abandoned, whilst the remaining section now provides a second link from the Westhafen Canal to the River Spree and to the Landwehr Canal at Spreekreuz.
