= Charlottenburg Canal =

Canal in Berlin, Germany

Coordinates: 52°31′41″N 13°18′52″E

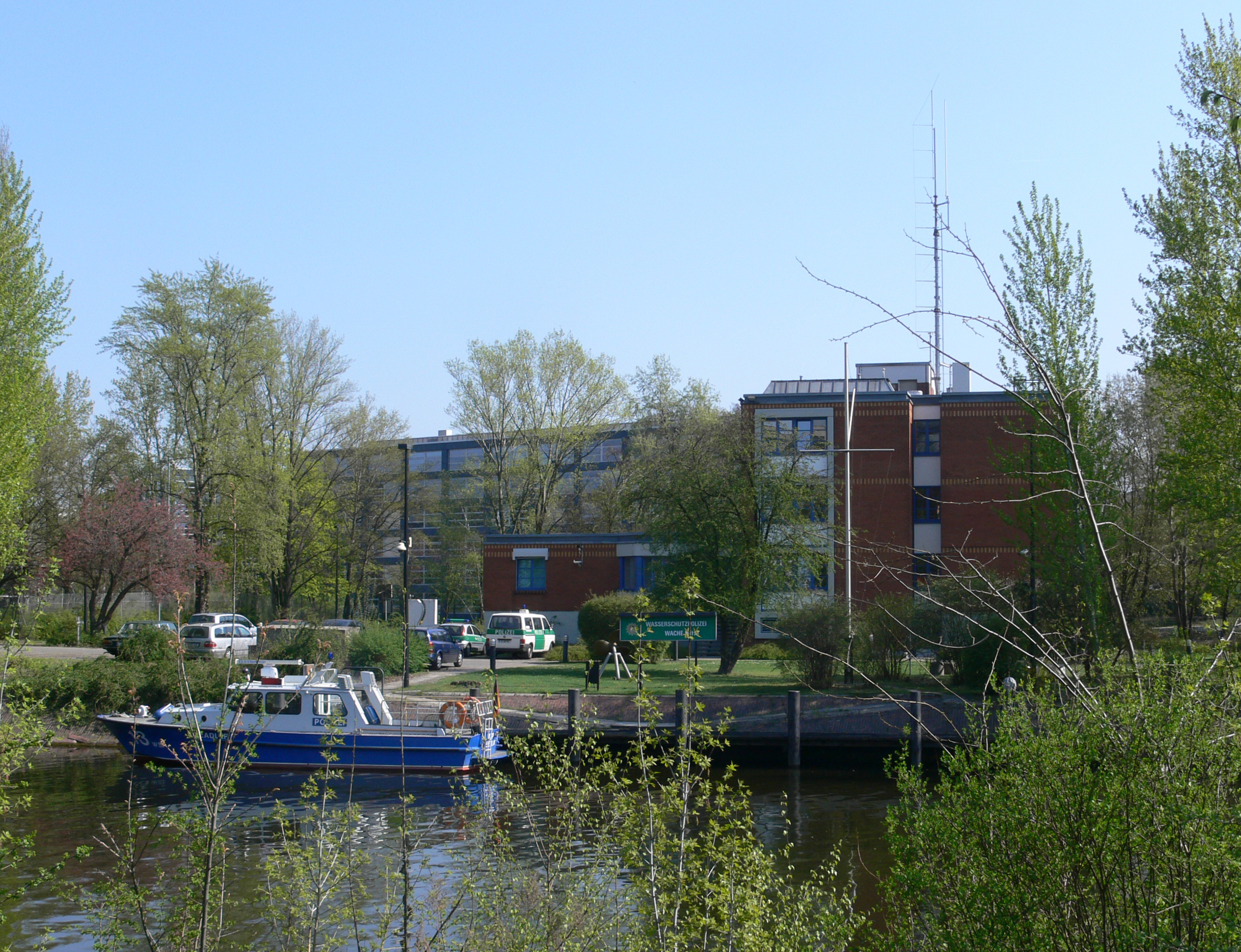
- Police station on the Charlottenburg Canal
- Interactive map of Charlottenburg Canal

Specifications
- Length: 1.7 km (1.1 miles)

History
- Construction began: 1848
- Date completed: 1859

Geography
- Start point: River Spree, in Charlottenburg
- End point: Berlin-Spandau Ship Canal (originally), Westhafen Canal (currently)

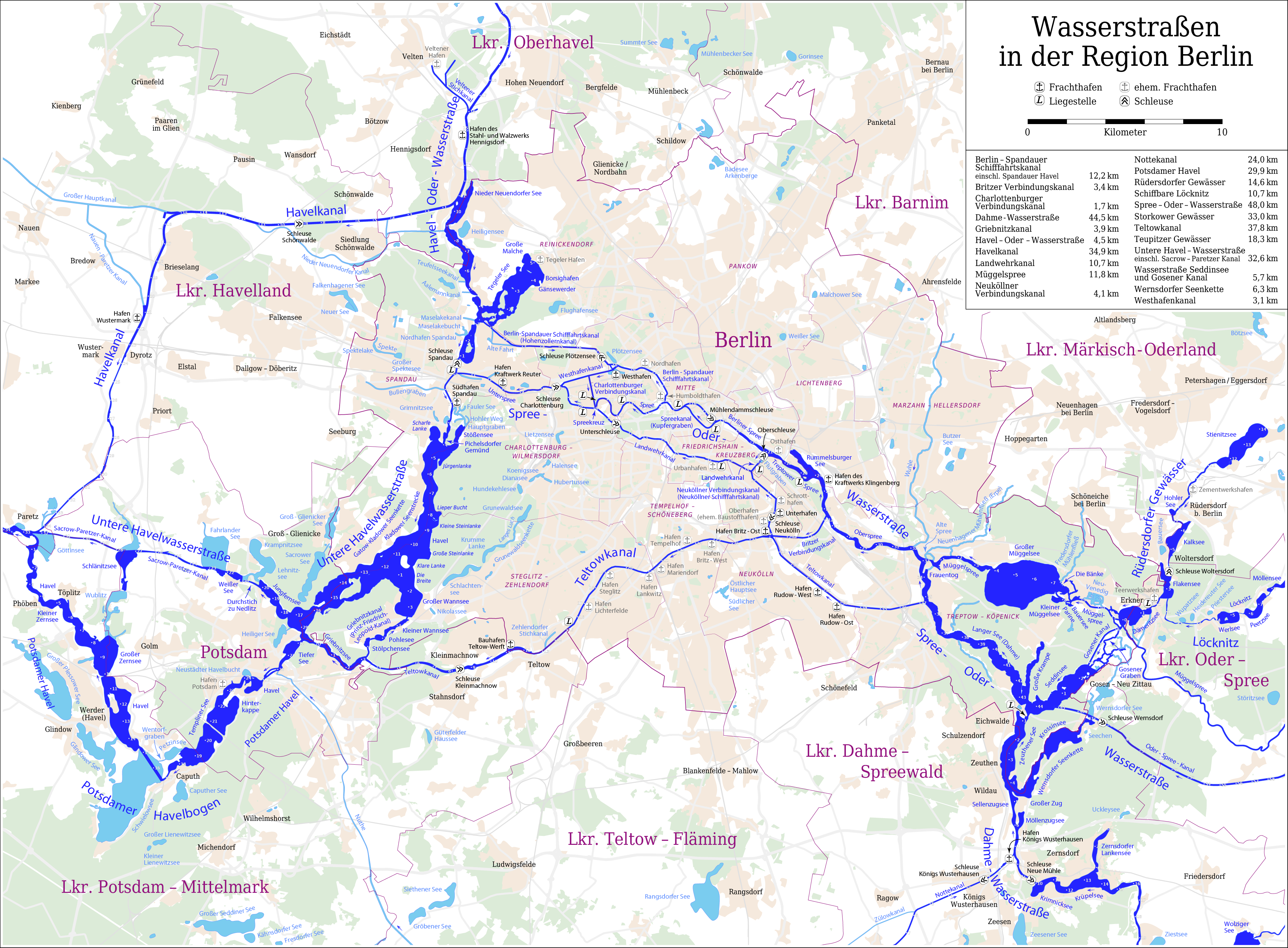
Map of waterways in the Berlin region

The Charlottenburg Canal, or Charlottenburger Verbindungskanal in German, is a canal in Berlin, Germany.

With a former length of 3.2 kilometres (2.0 mi), the canal was built between 1848 and 1859, and originally connected the River Spree, in Charlottenburg, with the Berlin-Spandau Ship Canal. The route of canal was north from the River Spree until it passed under the railway bridge carrying the Ringbahn, at which point it turned east along an alignment slightly to the south of that of the more recent Westhafen Canal. After the completion of the latter in 1956, the north–south aligned section of the Charlottenburg Canal was extended to form a right-angled junction with the Westhafen Canal, and the west to east aligned section was closed and filled in. The Berliner Großmarkt or Berlin Wholesale Market now covers the site of this section.

The remaining 1.7-kilometre (1.1 mi) long canal still links the Westhafen Canal with the River Spree and the Landwehr Canal. It has no locks.

The waterways crossroad at the southern end of the Charlottenburg Canal, where it meets both the River Spree and the Landwehr Canal, is known as Spreekreuz. Adjoining the canal near Spreekreuz is a police station of the Berlin Wasserschutzpolizei (water police).
