= Berlin Jungfernheide station =

Railway station in Berlin

Jungfernheide
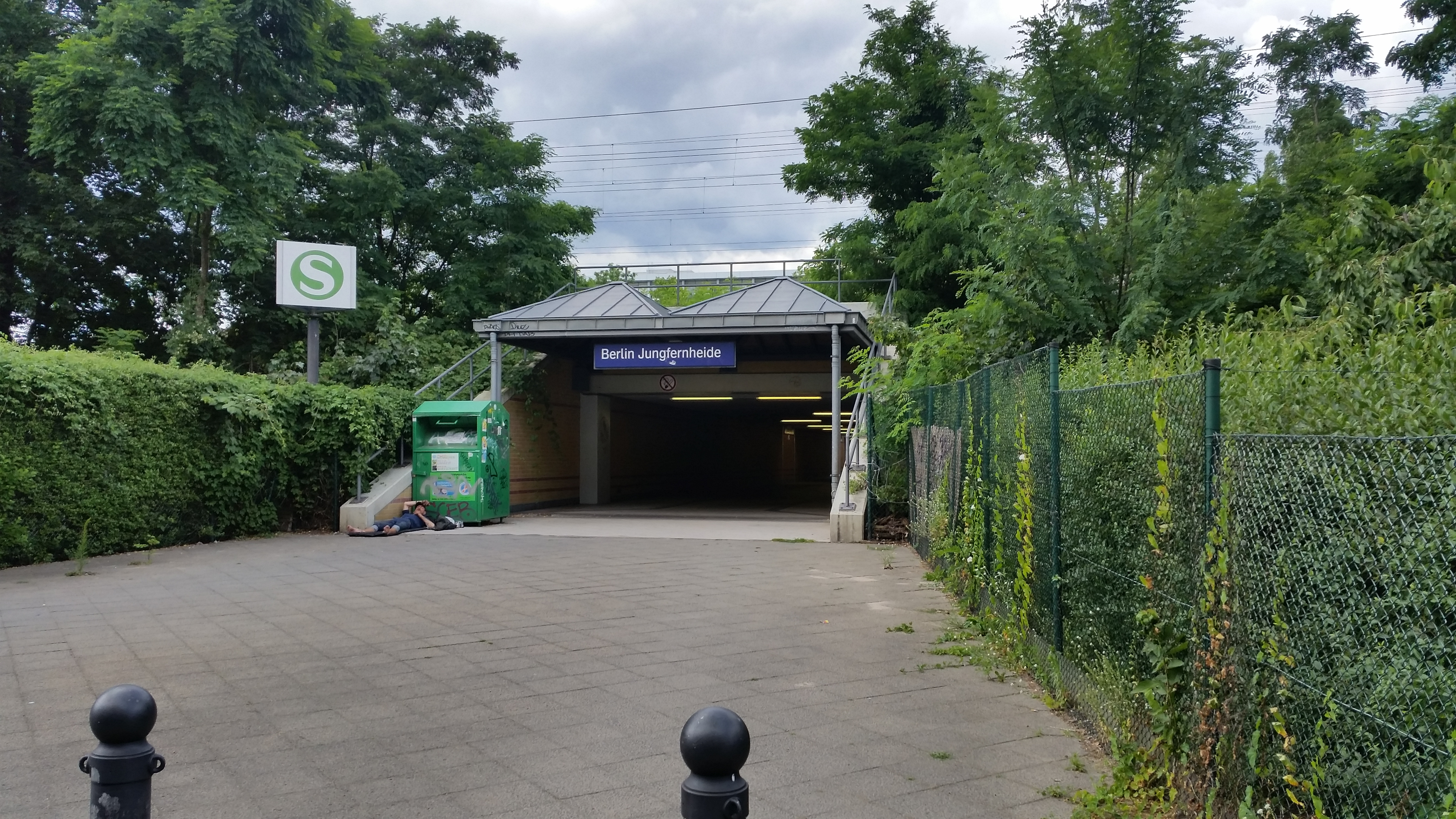

General information
- Location: Max-Dohrn-Str. 5, Charlottenburg-Wilmersdorf, Berlin; Germany
- Coordinates: 52.530°N 13.299°E
- Operator: DB Station&Service
- Platforms: 2
- Tracks: 4

Other information
- Station code: 3067
- DS100 code: BJUF (long distance); BJUN (S-Bahn)
- IBNR: 8011167 (long distance); 8089100 (S-Bahn)
- Category: 4
- Fare zone: VBB: Berlin A/5555
- Website: www.bahnhof.de

History
- Opened: 1894; 132 years ago

Services
Preceding station	Ostdeutsche Eisenbahn	Following station
Berlin-Spandau towards Wismar	RE 8	Berlin Hbf towards Elsterwerda
Berlin-Spandau towards Nauen	RB 10	Berlin Hbf towards Wünsdorf-Waldstadt
Preceding station	DB Regio Nordost	Following station
Berlin-Spandau towards Rathenow or Stendal Hbf	RE 4	Berlin Hbf towards Jüterbog or Falkenberg (Elster)
Berlin-Spandau towards Potsdam Hbf	RB 21	Berlin Gesundbrunnen Terminus
Preceding station	Berlin S-Bahn	Following station
Westend One-way operation	S41	Beusselstraße Ringbahn (clockwise)
Westend Ringbahn (counter-clockwise)	S42	Beusselstraße One-way operation
Preceding station	Berlin U-Bahn	Following station
Jakob-Kaiser-Platz towards Rathaus Spandau	U7	Mierendorffplatz towards Rudow
Location

Berlin Jungfernheide is a railway station located at Charlottenburg-Nord, in the Charlottenburg-Wilmersdorf district of Berlin, served by the S-Bahn lines S41 and S42, the U-Bahn line U7 and Regional-Express trains of the Deutsche Bahn. Its name literally translates into "maidens' heathland"; it was named after the Jungfernheide, a former large forest in the proximity of this station.

== S-Bahn station ==
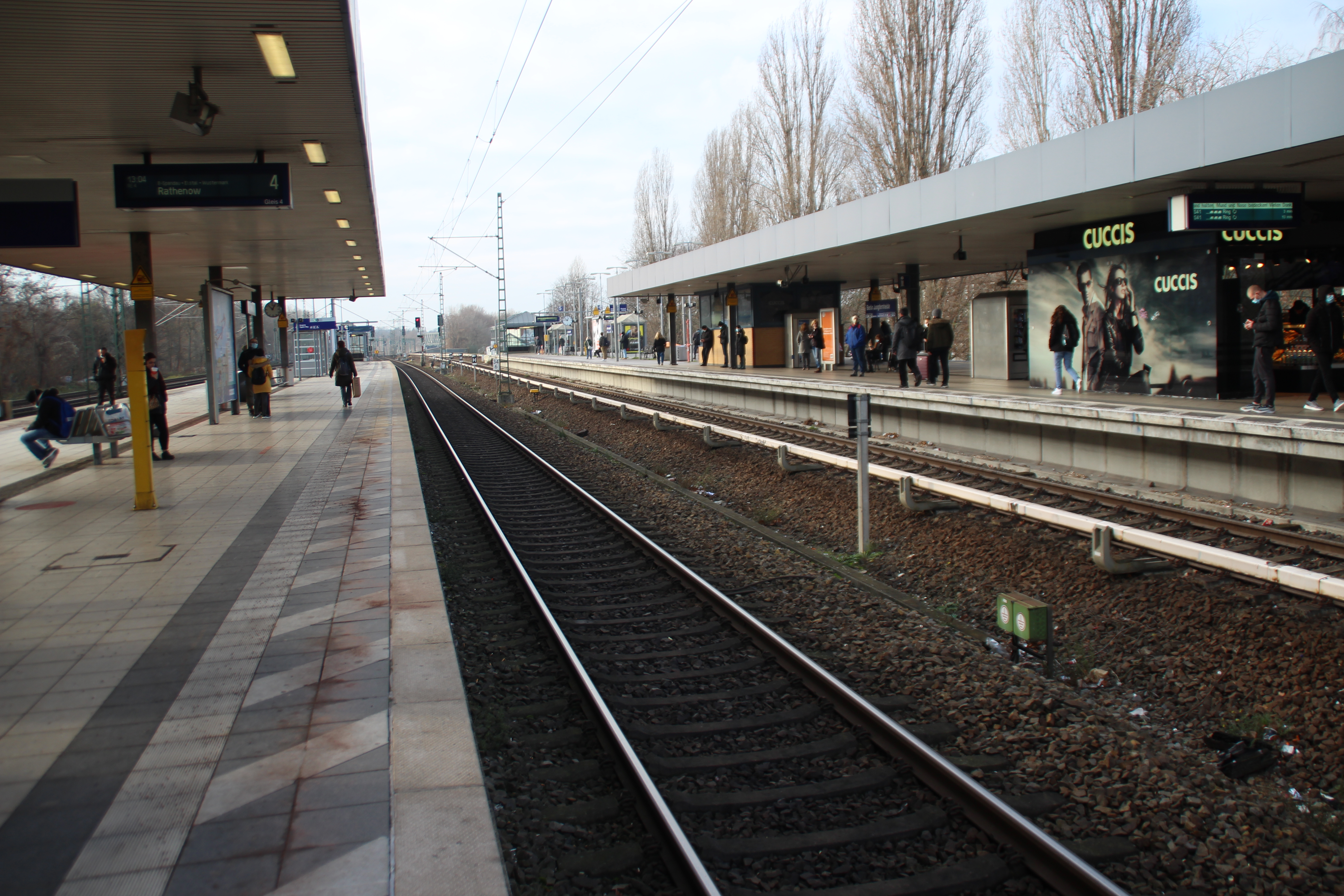
Platforms of the regional train (left) and the S-Bahn (right)

The S-Bahn station Jungfernheide was opened in 1894, around 20 years after the tracks were first laid on that stretch. It originally had a single island platform, served by trains of the Berlin Ringbahn. This was supplemented in 1908 by a second platform for suburban trains and then later by a third, built specifically for the new Siemensbahn, which was funded by the company Siemens to serve their plant some distance west of the station.

Following the building of the Berlin Wall in 1961, however, services were disrupted and the station was reduced to having two platforms. The station fell into complete disuse after 1980, when passenger numbers fell to unsustainable levels. This situation was intensified by the building of the U-Bahn line U7, which was essentially a parallel service to the S-Bahn to Spandau.

Following the fall of the Wall, many disused S-Bahn lines were brought back into use. This included the Ringbahn but none of the other routes through Jungfernheide, which therefore reopened with only one platform on 15 April 1997, at which time only the line from the south was in use. It was not until 2002 that the Ringbahn was operated again in its entirety and Jungfernheide enjoyed a status as an important interchange between S-Bahn and U-Bahn, owing to its being served by direct trains from the majority of Berlin's central districts.

== U-Bahn station ==
U-Bahn platform

The subway station was opened on 1 October 1980 on the occasion of the commissioning of the route from Rohrdamm to Richard-Wagner-Platz on the U7. Originally, a changeover to the S-Bahn was planned at this time. However, this had been shut down as a result of the strike of the Reichsbahn two weeks before.

As with other new Berlin U-Bahn buildings of the time, the architect Rainer Gerhard Rümmler was responsible for the visual design. The result was decorated with colorful floral motifs fired on ceramic tiles.

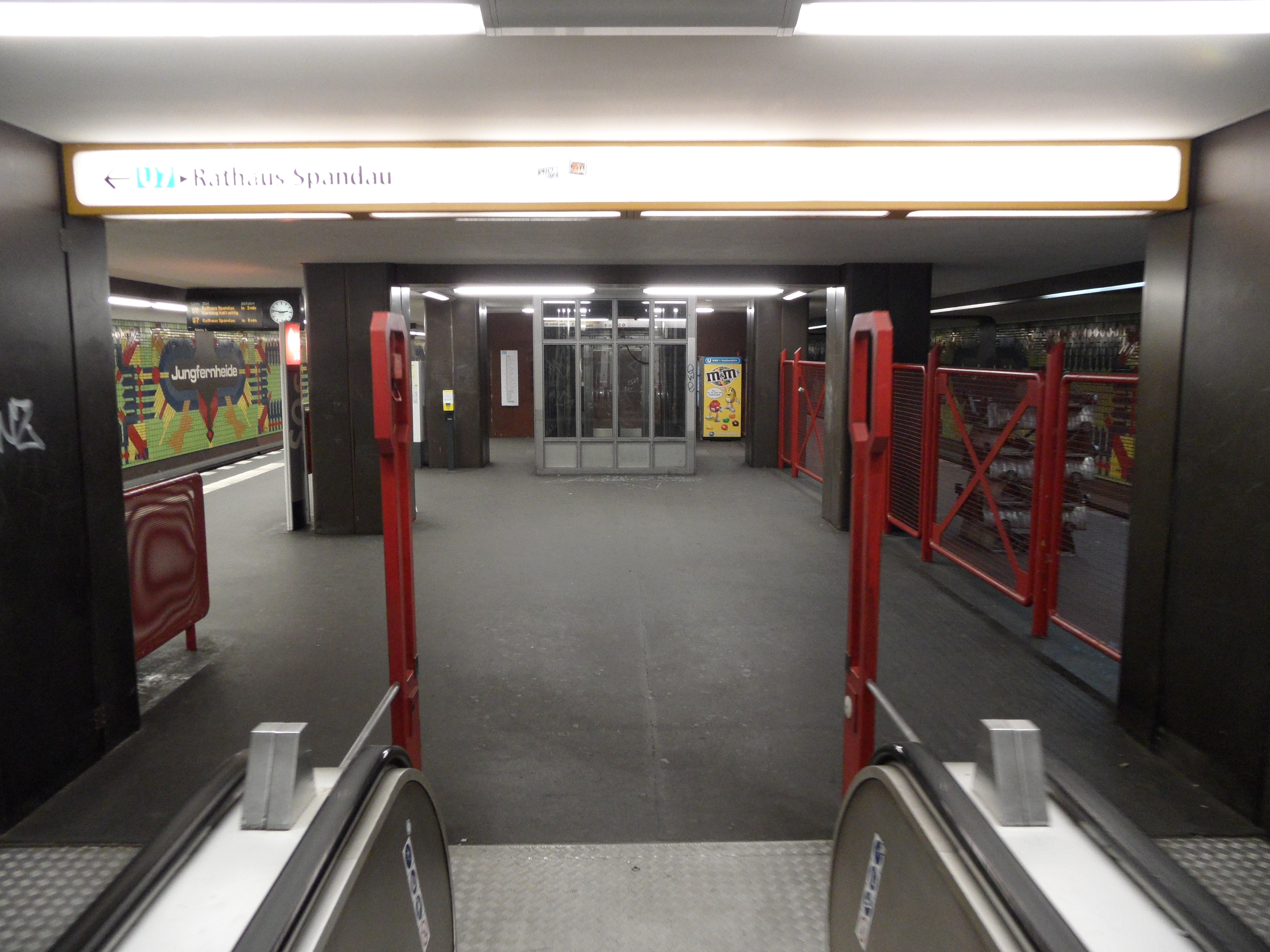
Used U7 track (left) and closed U5 track (right).

The station is designed with two stacked platforms, as a connection to Tegel Airport (Urban Tech Republic) and Rathaus Reinickendorf was provided by the Urban Ring "U0" and the extended U5 line. For this purpose, the eastern platform edge would have been used on both levels. Today, the trains are stacked in two levels, stopping in the direction of Rudow at the upper platform and at the lower platform in the direction of Rathaus Spandau.

On 17 December 1997, the subway station received an elevator that connects both platforms with the front hall for accessibility reasons.

In one part of the station and the adjoining unused track tunnel the fire-brigade exercise facility of the Berlin subway is located. It was inaugurated on 14 July 2003. The facility is 350 meters long, including a 90-meter smoke chamber. This makes the U5 platforms and tracks totally unusable. The U5 extension was later cancelled and became a tram route. In addition to the BVG-own staff firefighters, police, emergency physicians and Technisches Hilfswerk train in the emergency training center (Notfallübungscenter (NÜC)) the fire fighting and evacuation. An emergency exit can also be included in the exercises.

== Deutsche Bahn station ==
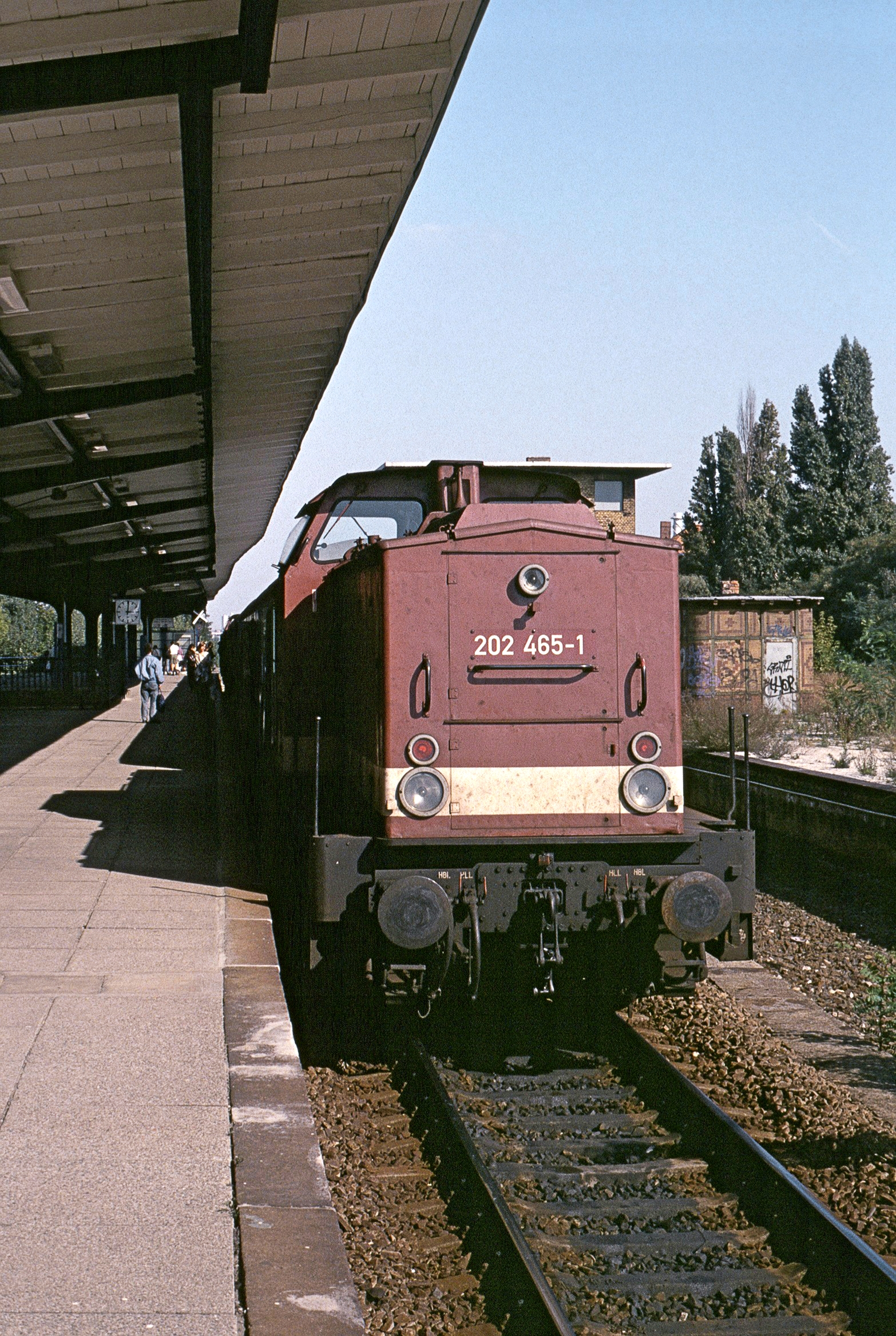
Regional train at platform B in September 1992.

The part of the station for regional trains was opened on 28 May 2006 along with the new Berlin Hauptbahnhof, which also included a major reorganisation of the train services in and around Berlin. The station is served around half-hourly for most of the day by the Regional-Express line RE4, which runs between Rathenow and Jüterbog, and the RegionalBahn service RB10, from Nauen to Berlin Hbf.

Before the Ringbahn was reactivated in this area, its platform B was used in the early 1990s as a terminus for regional trains.

== Rail services ==
The station is served by the following service:

- RE 4: (Stendal –) Rathenow – Wustermark – Berlin Jungfernheide – Berlin Hbf - Ludwigsfelde – Jüterbog (– Falkenberg (Elster))
- RE 8: Elsterwerda – Wünsdorf-Waldstadt – Berlin Südkreuz – Berlin Potsdamer Platz – Berlin Hbf – Berlin Jungfernheide – Berlin-Spandau – Nauen – Wittenberge – Schwerin – Wismar
- RB 10: Nauen – Falkensee – Berlin Jungfernheide – Berlin Hbf – Berlin Potsdamer Platz – Berlin Südkreuz – Rangsdorf
- RB 21: Berlin Gesundbrunnen – Berlin Jungfernheide – Berlin-Spandau – Dallgow-Döberitz – Wustermark – Golm – Potsdam

Berlin S-Bahn services:

- (Ring Clockwise) Jungfernheide - Gesundbrunnen - Ostkreuz - Treptower Park - Hermannstraße - Südkreuz - Innsbrucker Platz - Westkreuz - Westend - Jungfernheide
- (Ring Anti-clockwise) Jungfernheide - Westend - Westkreuz - Innsbrucker Platz - Südkreuz - Hermannstraße - Treptower Park - Ostkreuz - Gesundbrunnen - Jungfernheide

U-Bahn services:

- Spandau - Jungfernheide - Charlottenburg - Fehrberlliner Platz - Yorckstraße - Mehringdamm - Neukölln - Rudow

== Other transport links ==
The station is also served by four bus lines during the day. There is also one night bus service.
