= Berlin–Spandau Ship Canal =

Canal in Berlin, Germany

Coordinates: 52.5366°N 13.3637°E

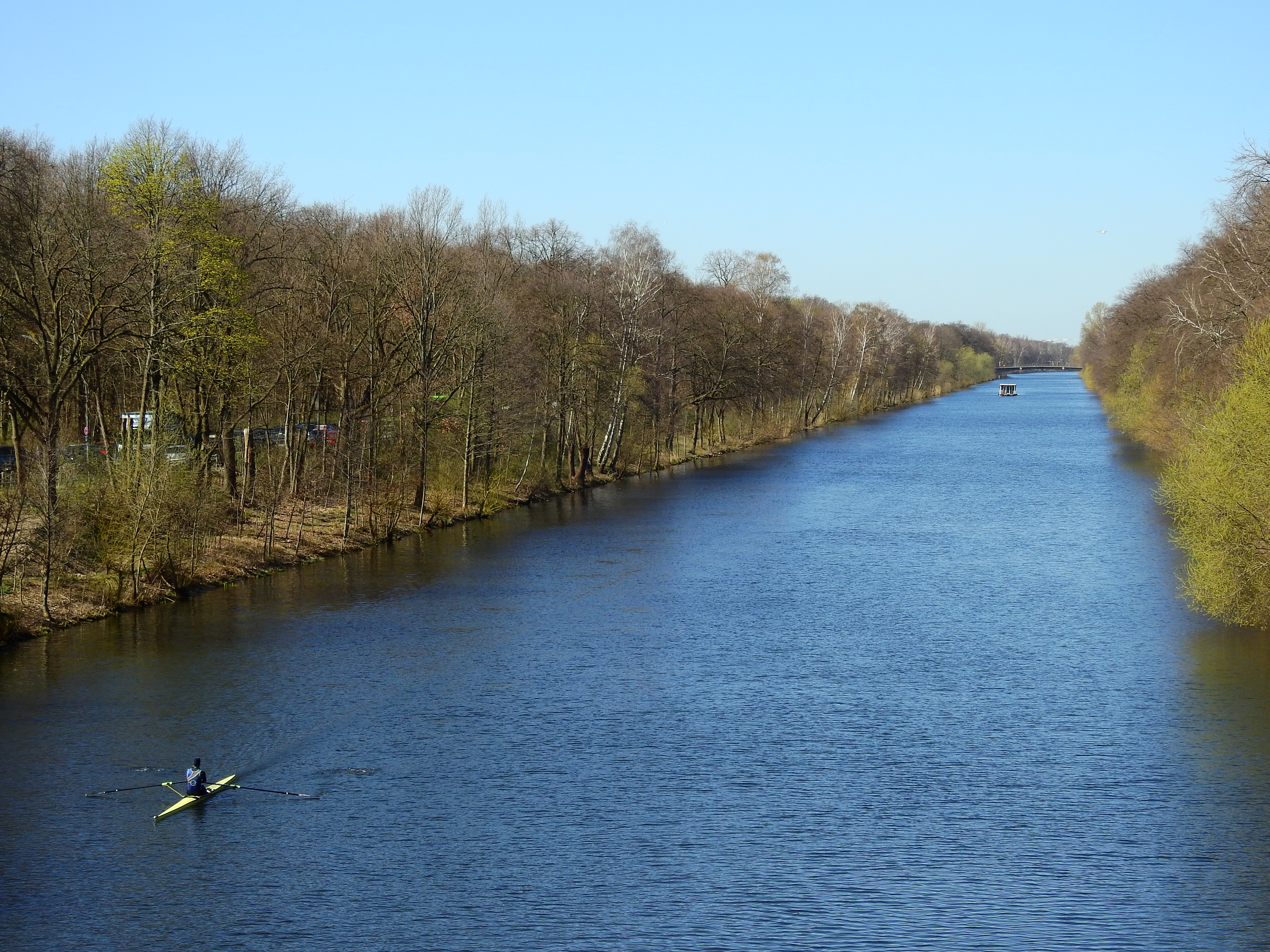
- View of the canal in April 2019, from the Berlin Tegel Airport access road
- Interactive map of Berlin–Spandau Ship Canal

Specifications
- Length: 12.2 km (7.6 miles)

History
- Construction began: 1848
- Date completed: 1859

Geography
- Start point: River Havel north of Spandau
- End point: River Spree near Berlin Hauptbahnhof

The Berlin–Spandau Ship Canal, or Berlin-Spandauer Schifffahrtskanal in German, is a canal in Berlin, Germany. It was built between 1848 and 1859 to a plan created by Peter Joseph Lenné, and was formerly known as the Hohenzollern Canal or Hohenzollernkanal.

The 12.2-kilometre (7.6 mi) long canal links the River Havel north of Spandau to the River Spree near the Hauptbahnhof in Berlin. Because it joins the Havel upstream of the river lock at Spandau, it provides a more direct route from the Spree to the Oder–Havel Canal.

The Westhafen, Berlin's largest port with an area of 173,000 m^{2} (42.75 acres) lies on the Berlin–Spandau Ship Canal some 4 kilometres (2.5 mi) from its eastern (River Spree) end. The Westhafen Canal and Charlottenburg Canal also connect the port to the Spree further downstream in Charlottenburg.

On August 26, 2013, author Wolfgang Herrndorf committed suicide by gunshot to the head on the banks of the canal following a long illness.

== Gallery ==
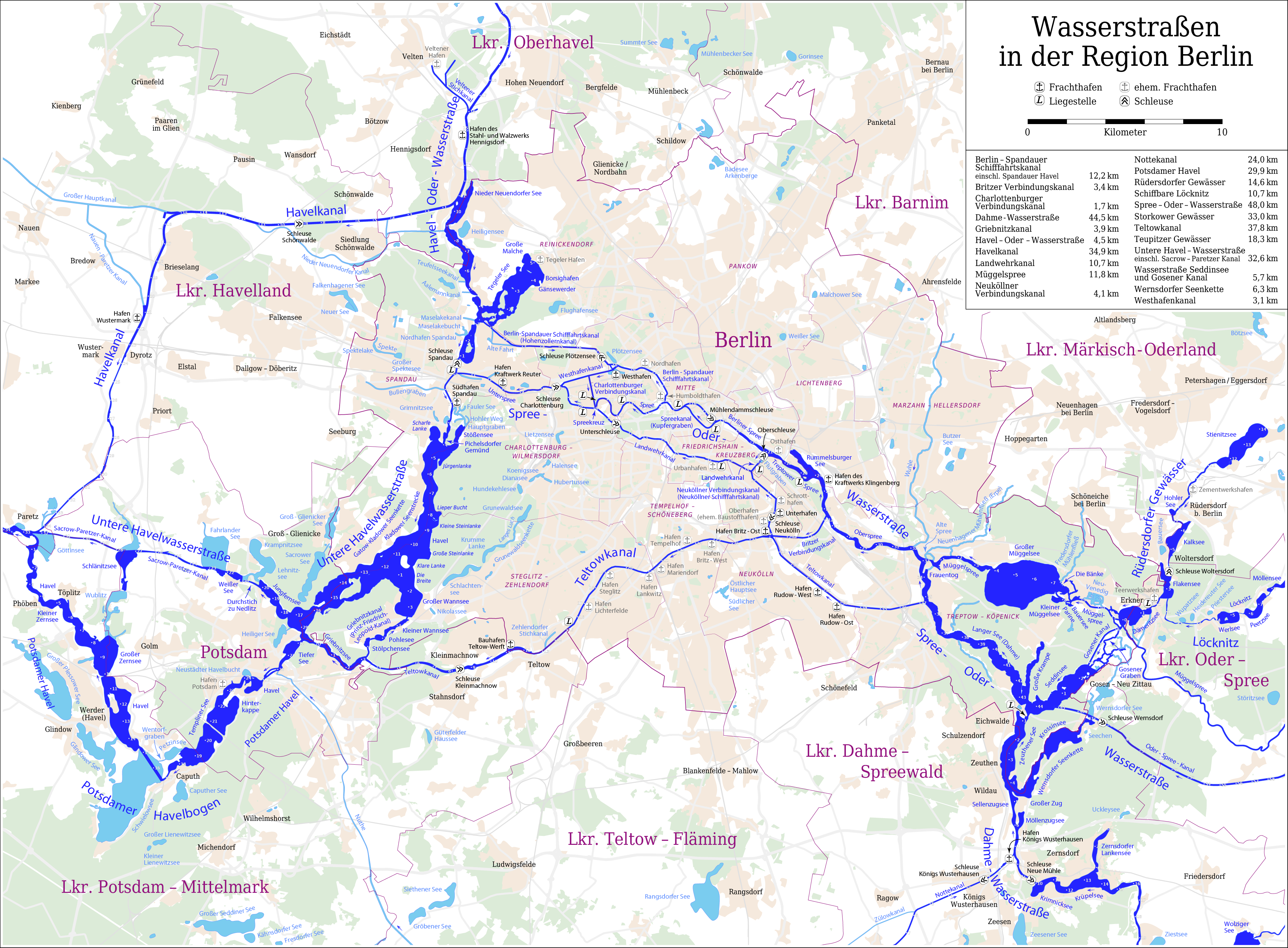
Map of waterways in the Berlin region

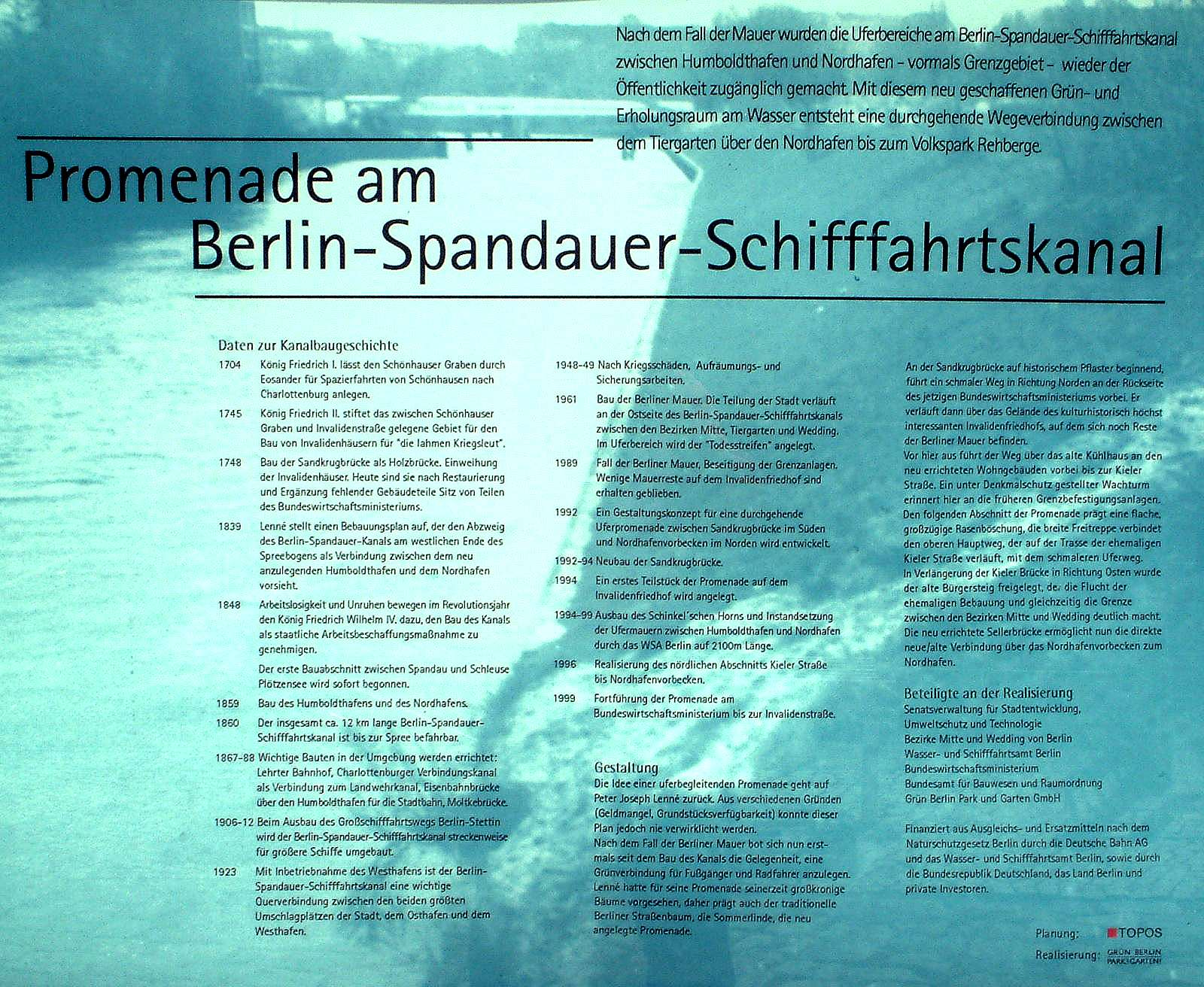
Information board on the promenade

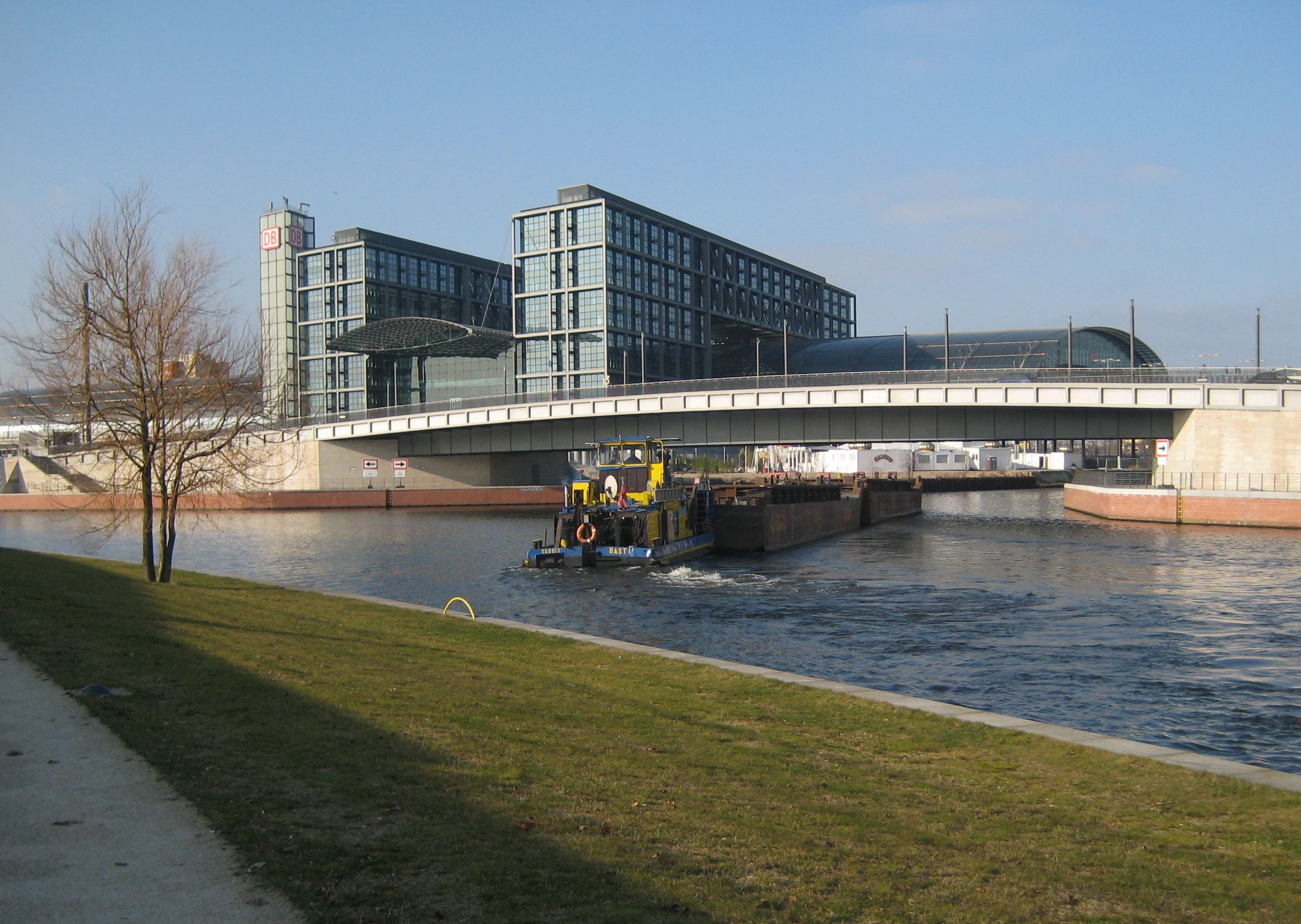
Barge entering the canal from the River Spree by the new Hauptbahnhof
