= Moderus Gamma =

Tram type built by Modertrans Poznań

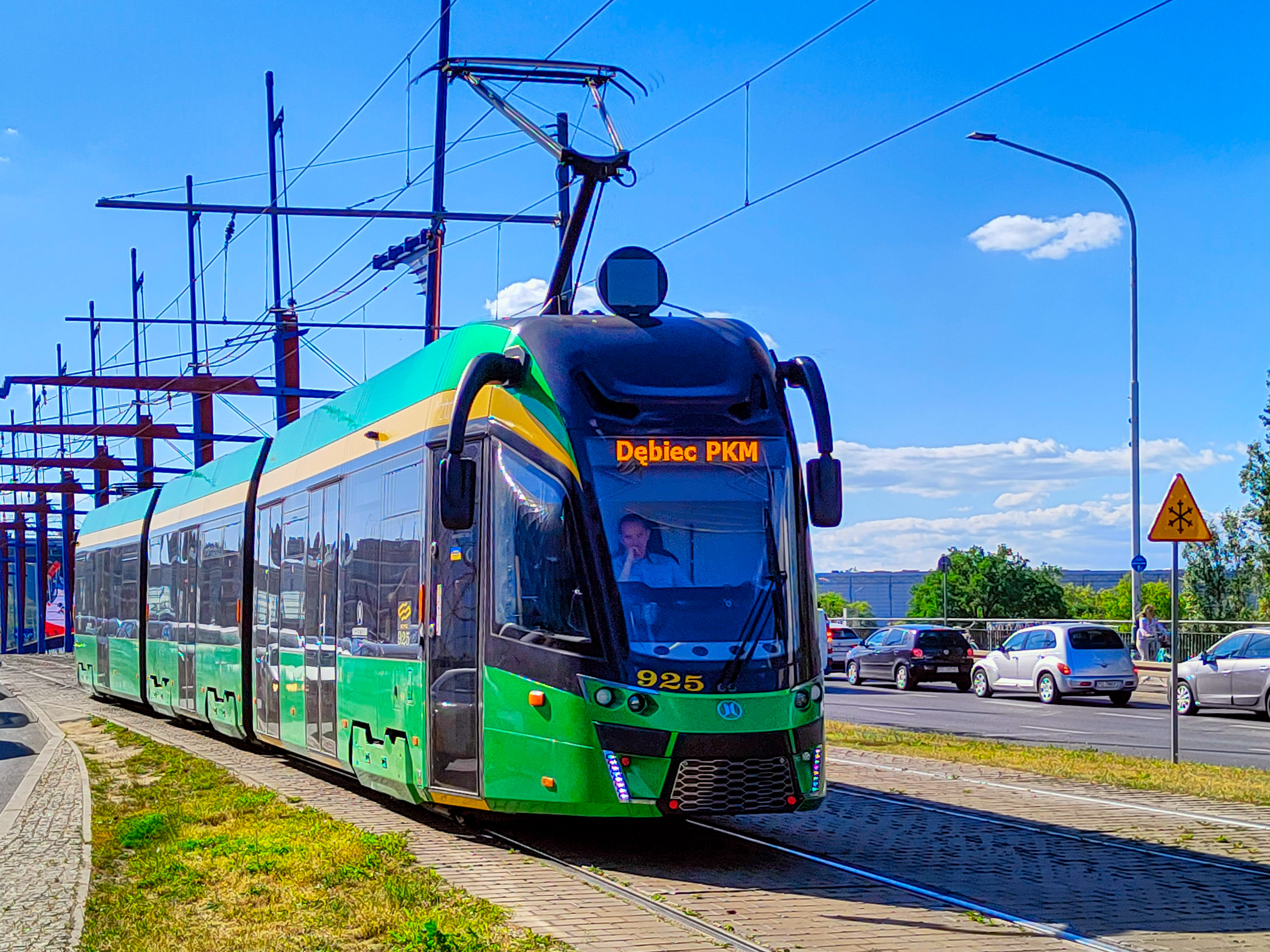
- In service: 2017–Present
- Manufacturer: Modertrans Poznań
- Built at: Biskupice
- Family name: Gamma
- Constructed: 2016, 2018–
- Formation: 3/5 sections, single car
- Capacity: 244 (66 seated) (Prototype); 240 (uni-directional); 233 (bi-directional)
- Operator: Various

Specifications
- Train length: 14.75 m (48 ft 5 in) - 32.42 m (106 ft 4 in)
- Width: 2.40 m (7 ft 10 in)
- Height: 3.65 m (12 ft 0 in) - 3.78 m (12 ft 5 in)
- Floor height: 350 - 360mm
- Maximum speed: 75 km/h (47 mph)
- Traction system: IGBT
- Power output: 400 kW
- Electric system: 600 V DC overhead lines
- Current collection: Pantograph
- Braking system: Regenerative brake
- Track gauge: 1,435 mm (4 ft 8 1/2 in)

The Moderus Gamma is an articulated tram manufactured in Biskupice, Poland, since 2016 by Modertrans Poznań, a subsidiary of transport operator MPK Poznań. Planning began in 2008 and the prototype was completed in 2016.

== Technical specifications ==
The Poznań tram cars are 31.4 metres (103 ft 0 in) long, 2.4 metres (7 ft 10 in) wide and have a power output of 400 kW. They are fitted with IGBT transistors. Five-section Gamma trams have a length of 32 metres (105 ft 0 in). The prototype was equipped with capacitors for storing the energy produced during regenerative braking.

== Interior ==
The interior of the tram includes air conditioning, USB sockets and a passenger information system. The prototype has capacity for 244 passengers with 66 seats, including three folding seats. The uni-directional trams have a passenger capacity of 240 and the bi-directional sets have a passenger capacity of 233.

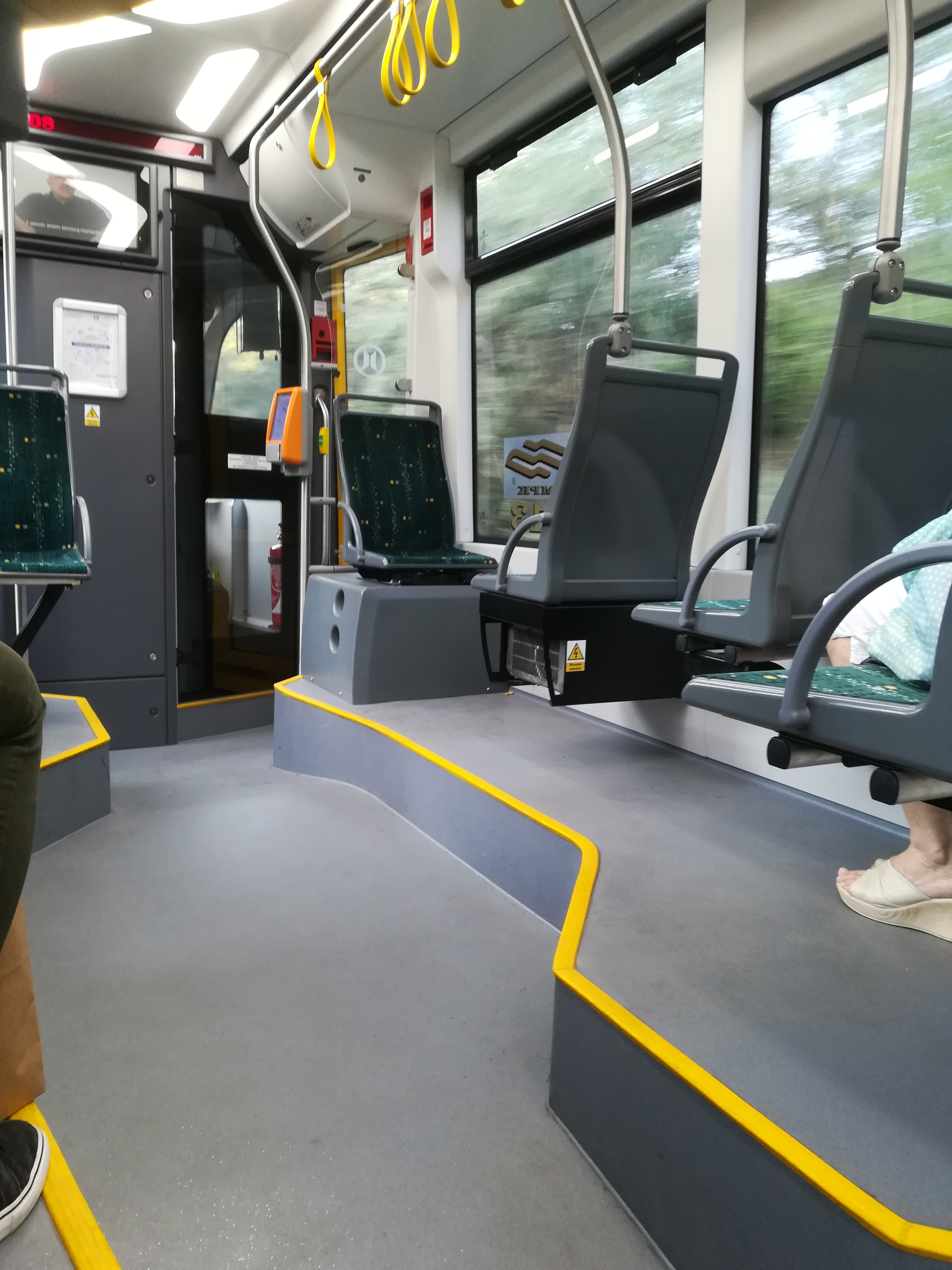
Interior of a Gamma LF02AC

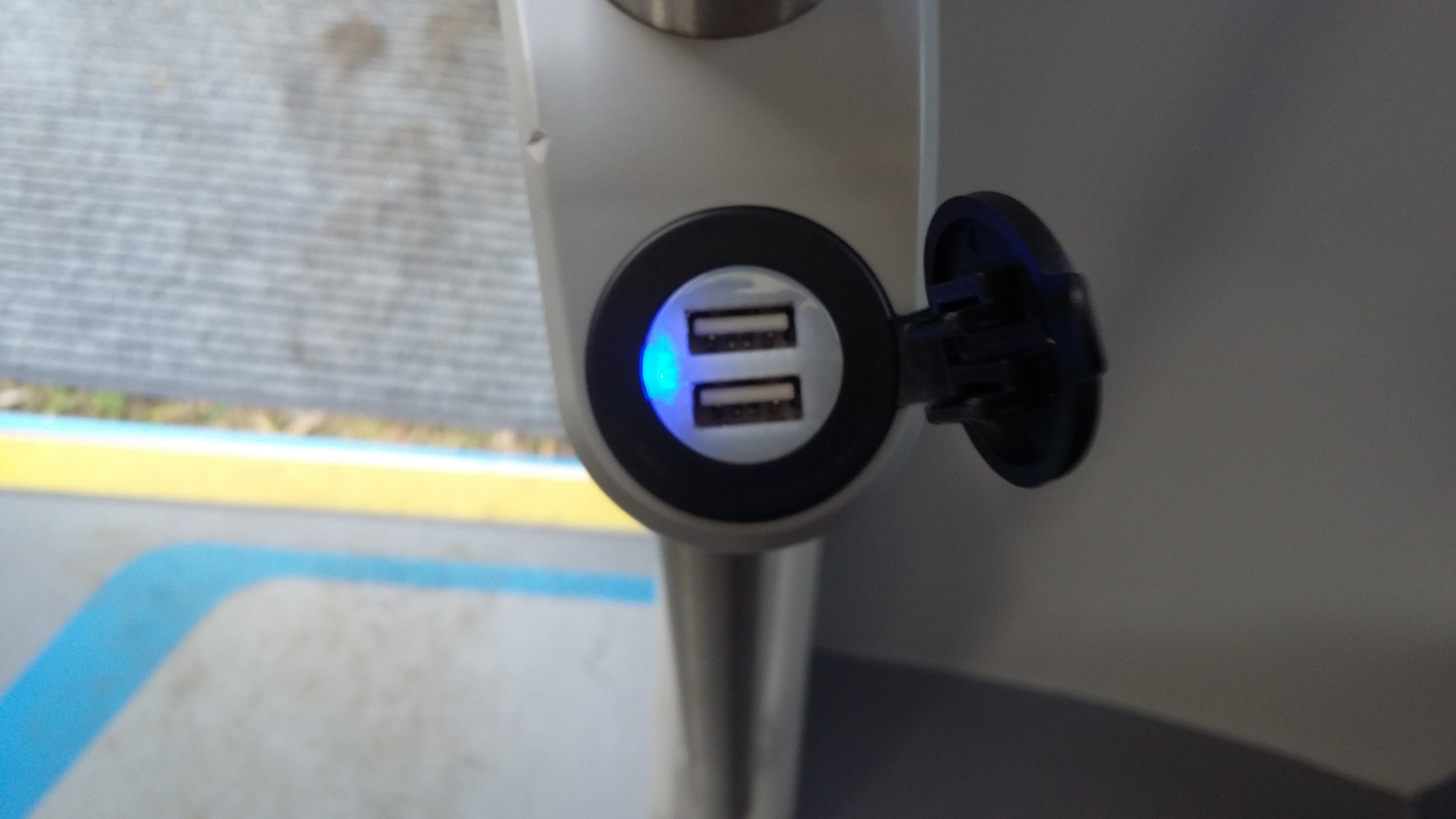
USB sockets inside a Gamma LF01AC

== History ==
The tram was developed through a project called "Innovative City Tram," which was co-sponsored by the National Centre for Research and Development in Poland and the European Union. The prototype was finished in 2016 and presented at the manufacturer's factory in Poznań on 18 November 2016. In January 2017, MPK Poznań ordered 50 new Gamma trams: 30 uni-directional and 20 bi-directional sets. The prototype entered service in Poznań on 15 May 2017. Some Gamma LF02AC trams are stationed at the Franowo depot. Gamma trams are expected to replace second-hand German-built Type GT8 trams.

In October 2017, the Gamma tram began test runs on the Gdańsk tram system.

In March 2018, a contract for the delivery of ten single-section trams was signed by Tramwaje Śląskie and Modertrans. These trams will be based on the Gamma design. The first tram was delivered in April 2020. According to Urban Transport Magazine, these trams are classified as Moderus Beta MF 10 AC.

Five-section Gamma trams are scheduled to be delivered to Łódź in 2022. 30 sets were ordered by Łódź MPK in late 2019.

Three single-car Gamma LF 10 AC BD trams were ordered for the Woltersdorf Tramway in 2022, the first of which was delivered in March 2024. Also, a fourth tram has been ordered through an option in the initial order.

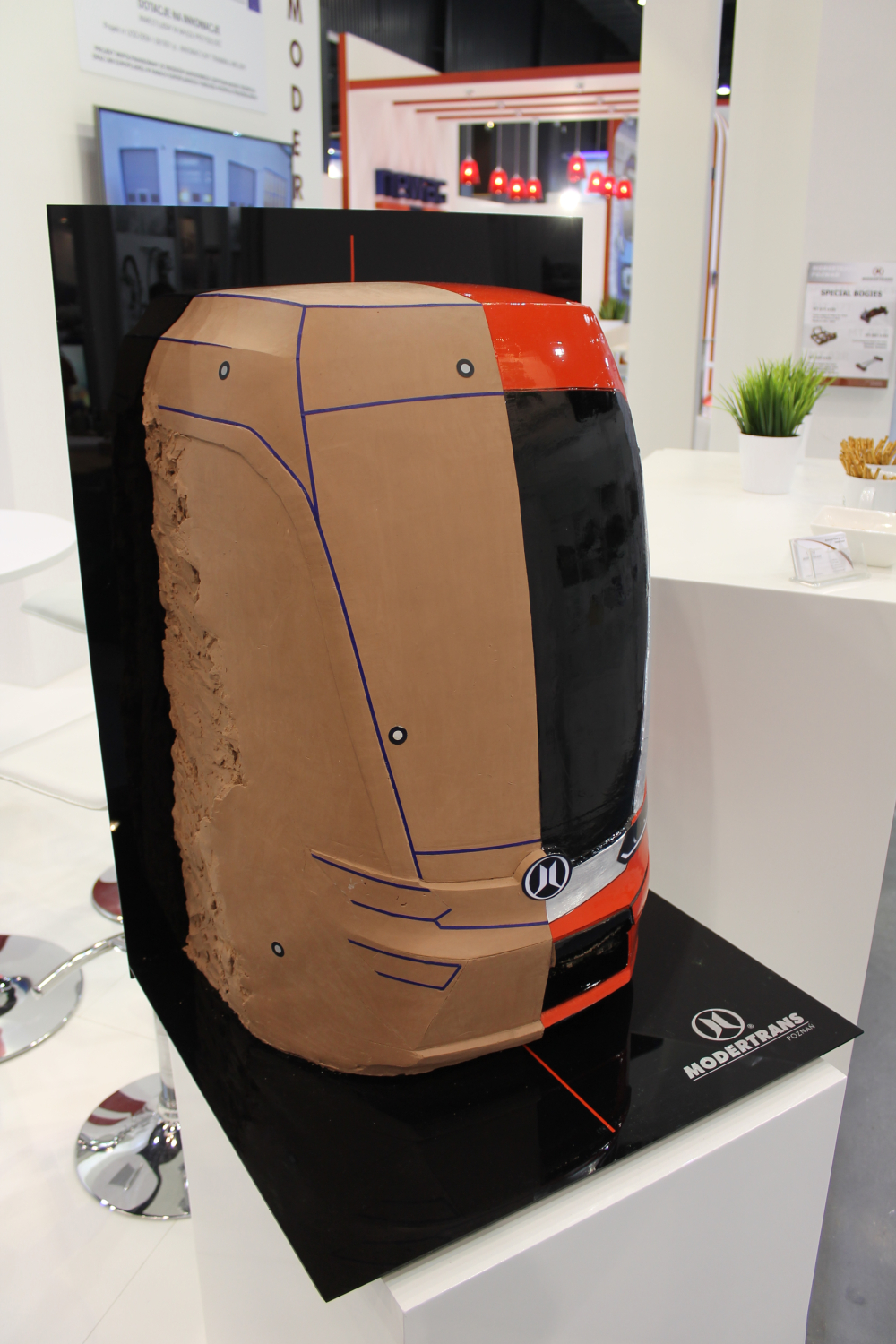
Clay model at Trako 2015

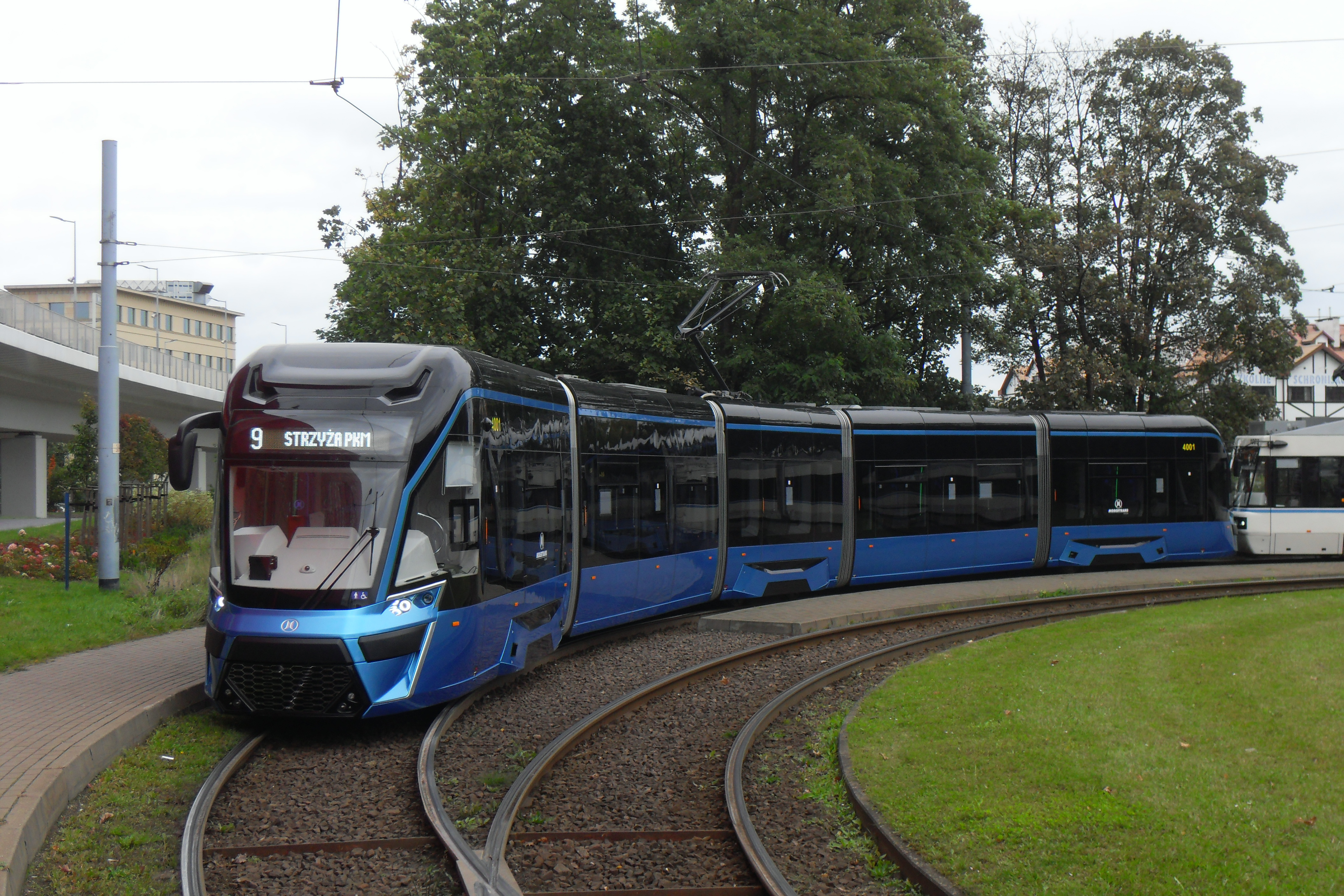
Moderus Gamma in Gdańsk in October 2017

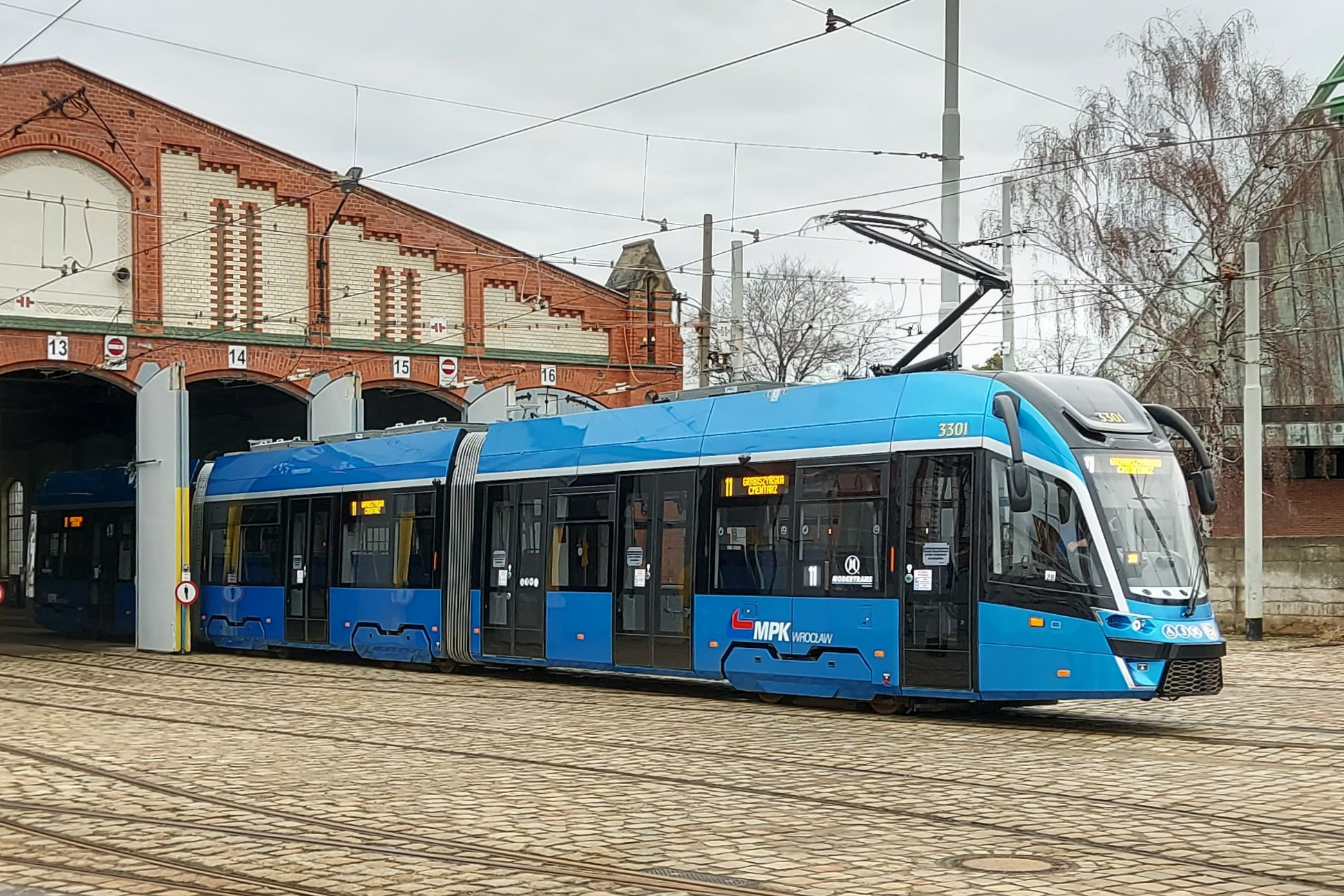
Moderus Gamma LF 07 AC of MPK Wrocław

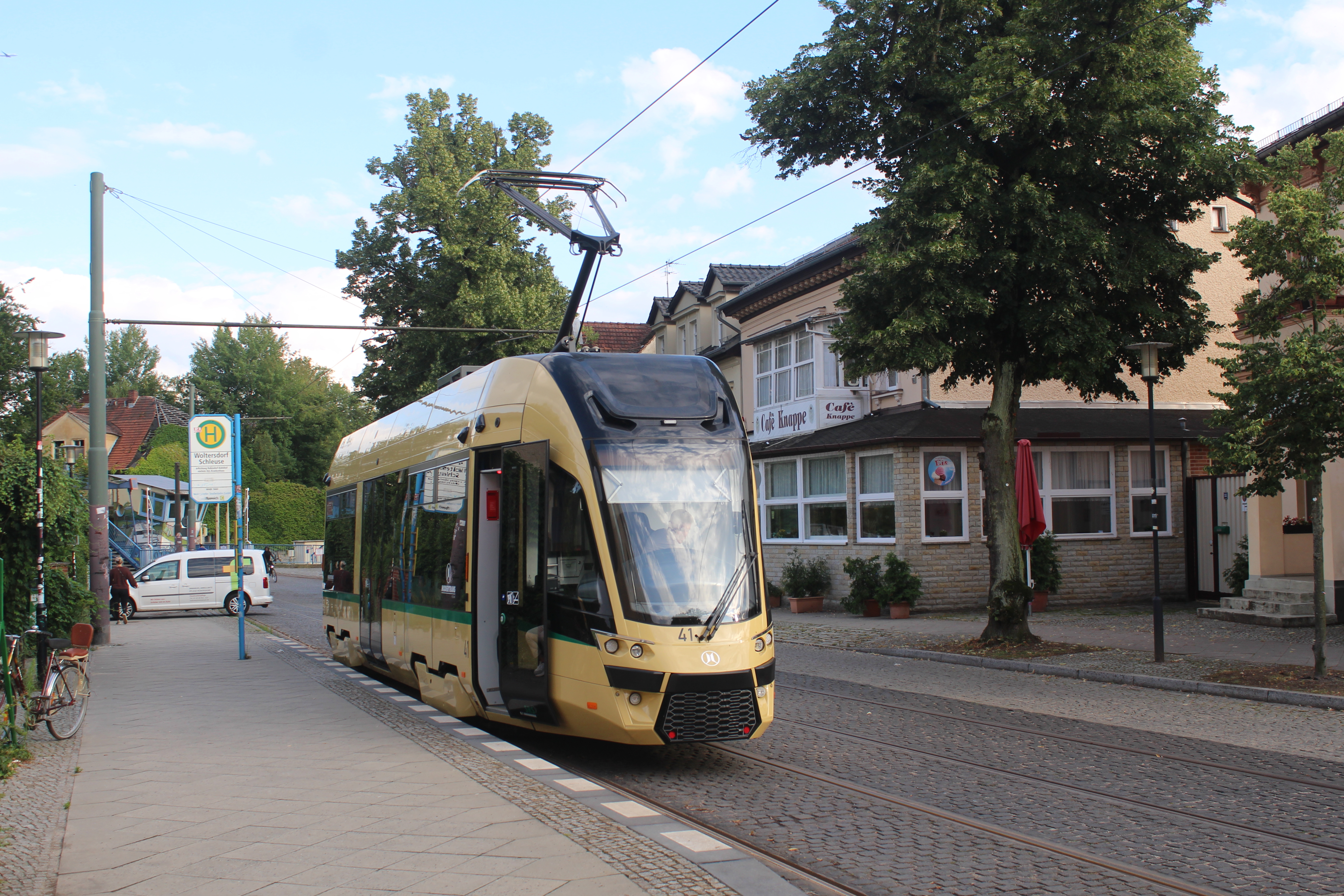
Moderus Gamma in Woltersdorf, Germany

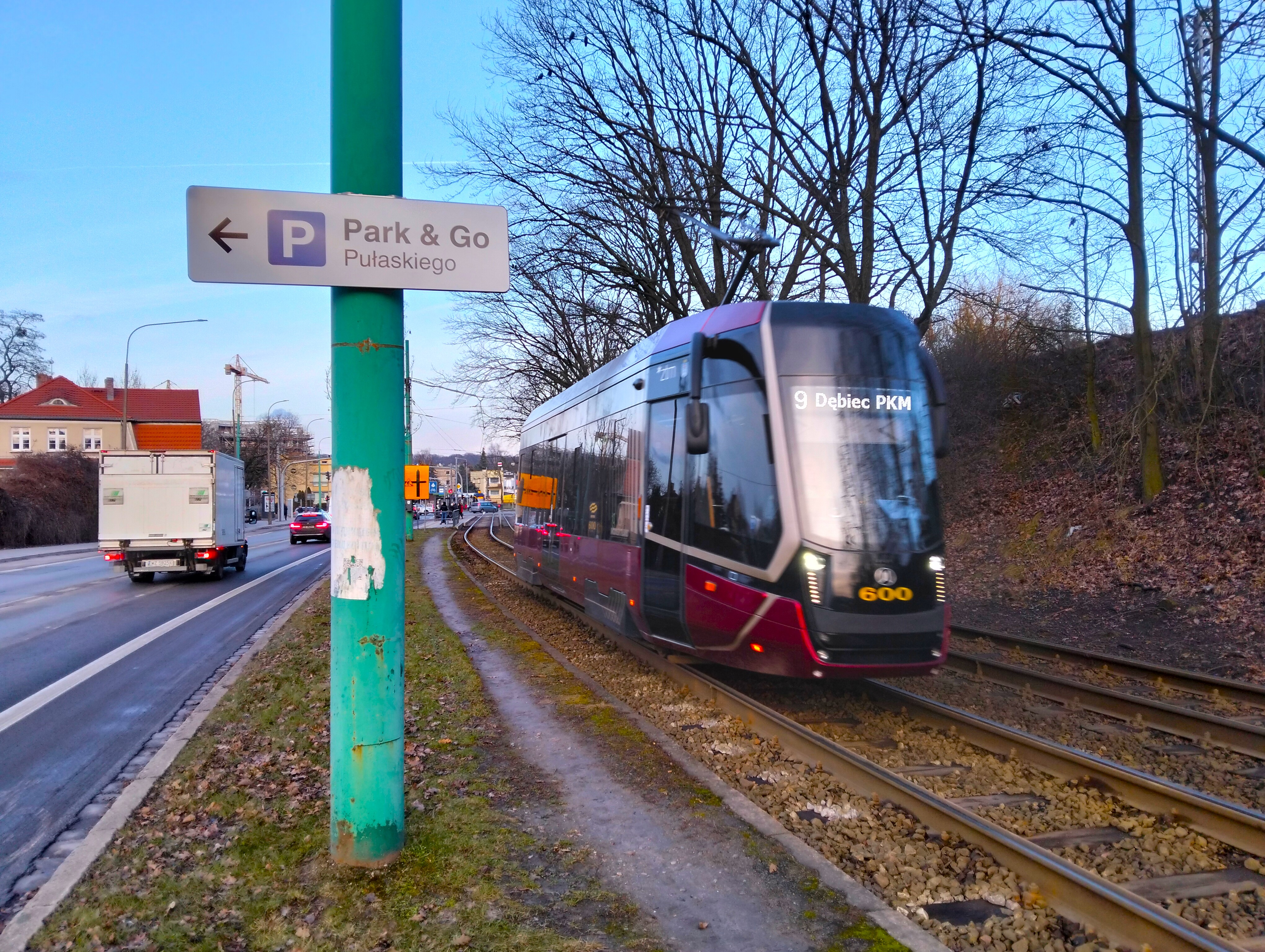
Moderus Gamma in Poznań, Poland

== Variants ==
Multiple variants of the Gamma tram exist, are ordered or are under construction.

Type	City	Owner	Quantity	Service	Lenght	Sections	Image
LF 01 AC (Prototype)	Poznań	MPK Poznań	1	2017	32.01m	5	
LF 02 AC	Poznań	MPK Poznań	30	2018	31.94m	3	
LF 03 AC BD	Poznań	MPK Poznań	20	2019	31.94m	3	
LF 04 AC BD	Poznań	MPK Poznań	30	2025	31.97m	3	
LF 05 AC (Prototype)	Poznań	MPK Poznań	1	2023	14.75m	1	
LF 06 AC	Łódź	MPK Łódź	30	2021	32.42m	5	
LF 07 AC	Wrocław	MPK Wrocław	46	2023	31.94m	3	
LF 10 AC BD	Woltersdorf	Schöneicher – Rüdersdorf Strassenbahn GmbH	4	2025	14.91m	1	
LF 11 AC BD	Łódź	MPK Łódź	0/15				
LF 12 AC BD	Szczecin	Tramwaje Szczecińskie	12	2026	31.87m	3	

== Awards and distinctions ==
- 2017 - Top Design Award 2017 in the Top Design 2017 competition in the Automotive and public transport category.
- 2017 - award in the Rolling stock category in the competition Jan Podoski organized during the Trako fair.
- 2017 - award in the Good Design 2017 competition in the Transport and Communication category.
- 2019 - award in the Rolling stock category in the competition Jan Podoski organized during the Trako fair.
