= Dämeritzsee =

Lake in Brandenburg, Germany

- Location within Brandenburg

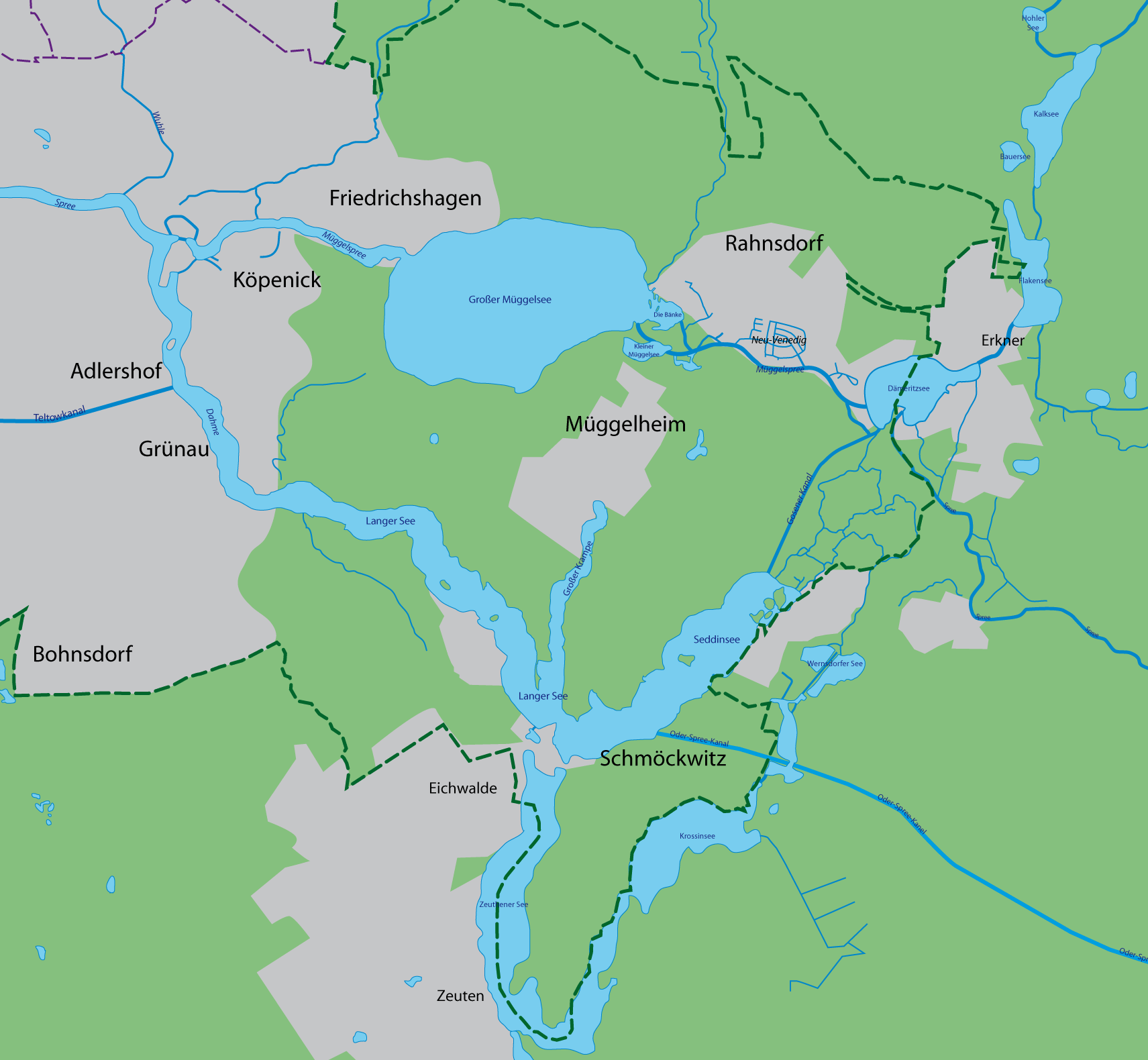
- Location: Brandenburg / Berlin
- Coordinates: 52°25′22″N 13°44′2″E
- Primary inflows: Spree, Flakenfließ
- Primary outflows: Müggelspree
- Basin countries: Germany
- Surface area: 93.5 hectares (231 acres)
- Max. depth: 4.5 metres (15 ft)
- Surface elevation: 32 metres (105 ft)
- Settlements: Berlin, Erkner

The Dämeritzsee (German pronunciation) is a lake located in Brandenburg and Berlin, Germany. At an elevation of 32 metres (105 ft), its surface area is 93.5 hectares (231 acres). It is located partly in the municipality of Erkner (Oder-Spree district) and part in Rahnsdorf, a Berliner locality in Treptow-Köpenick district.

The lake forms part of the course of the River Spree, and is the location of that river's confluence with the short Flakenfließ that flows out of the Flakensee. The reach of the Spree downstream to the Müggelsee is also known as the Müggelspree.

The Muggelspree and the Flakenfließ are both navigable, and the lake is also linked to the nearby Seddinsee by the Gosen Canal. The lake sees considerable sightseeing and leisure traffic, and also forms a link in a commercial navigation route from the limestone workings at Rüdersdorf, which reaches the Flakensee by a lock at Woltersdorf, and connects to the River Dahme and the Oder-Spree Canal via the Seddinsee.
