= Gosen Canal =

Coordinates: 52.409278°N 13.710251°E

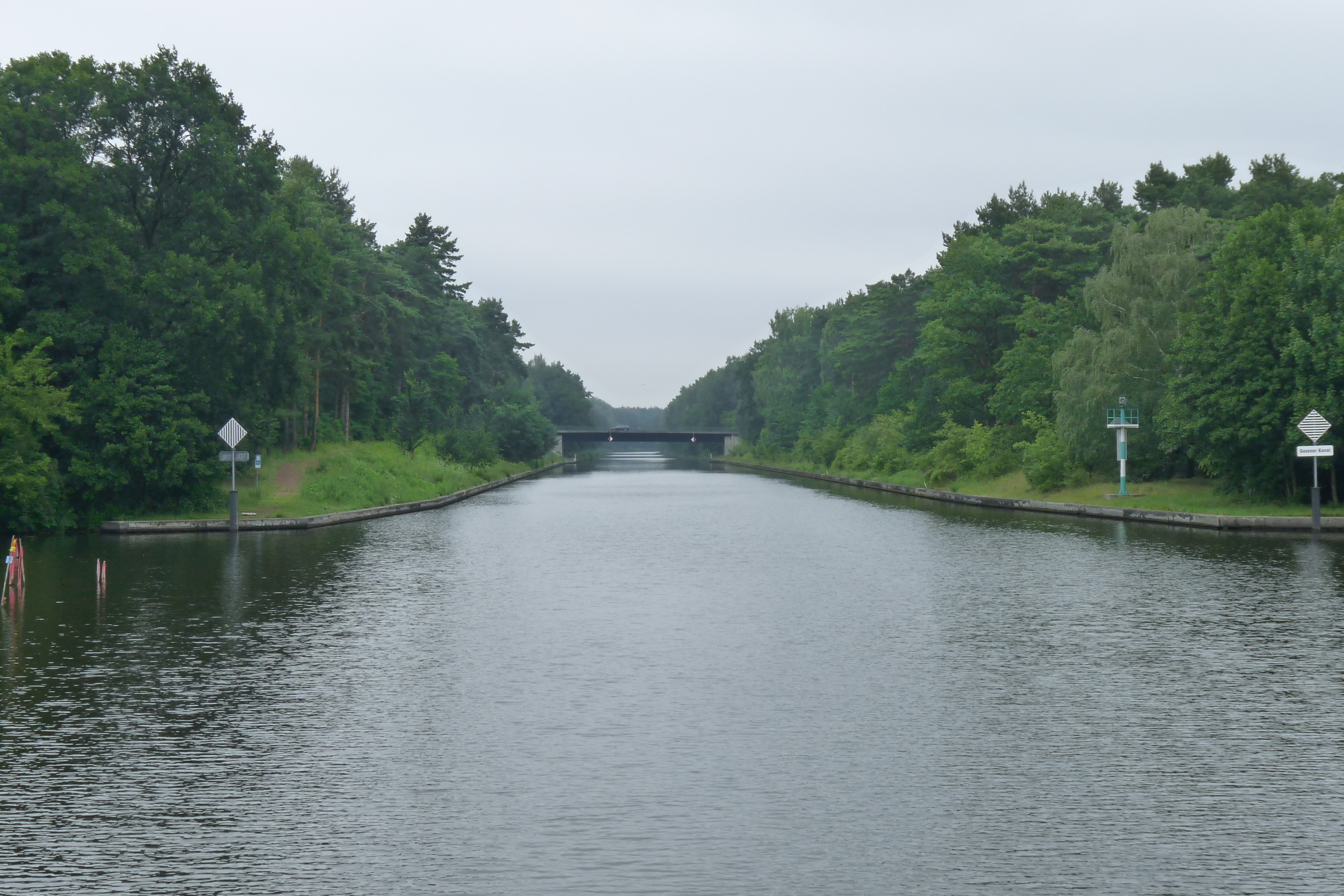
Entrance to the Gosen Canal from the Seddinsee

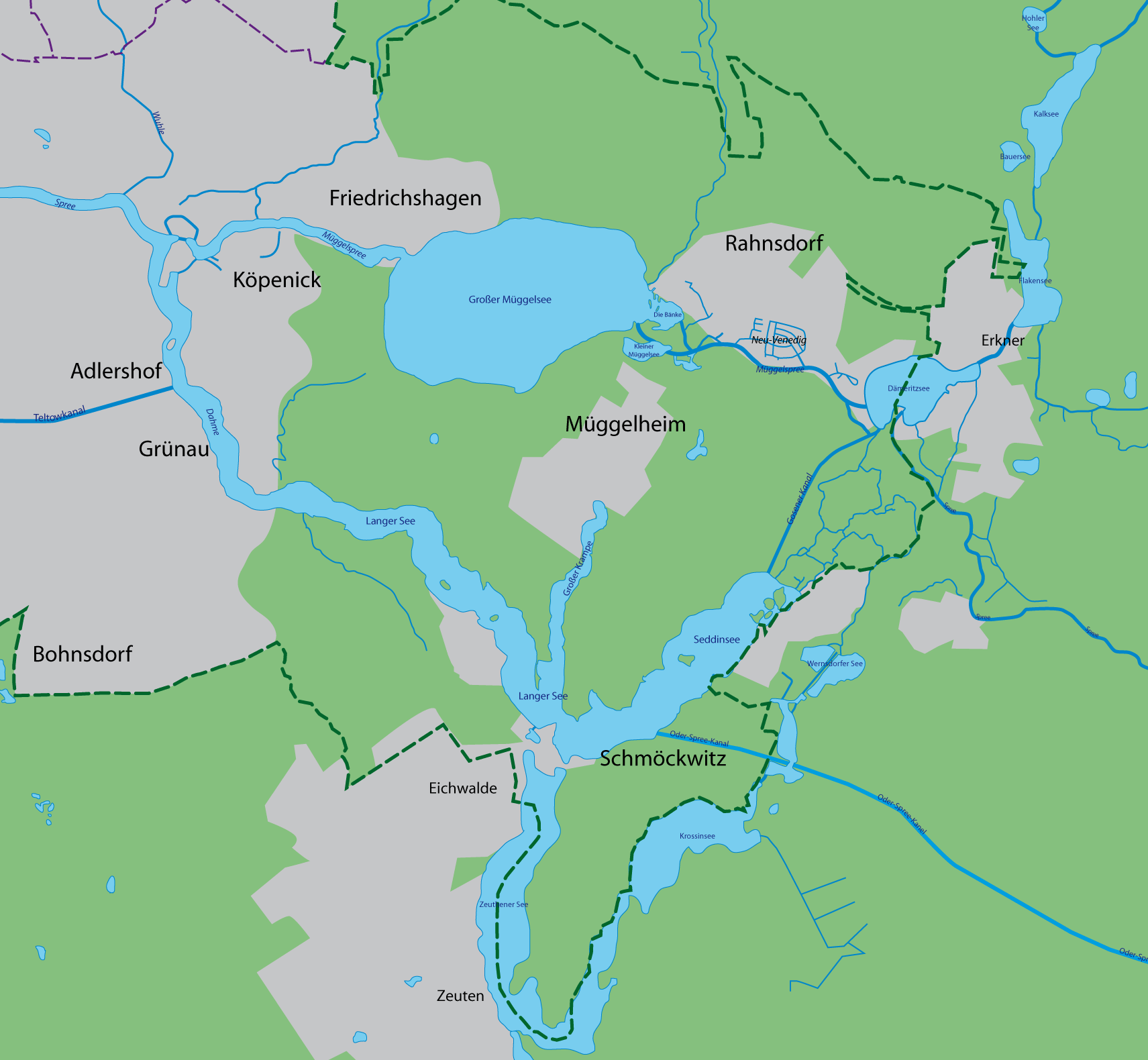
Map of the waterways of south-east Berlin, with the Gosen Canal centre-right

The Gosen Canal (German: Gosener Kanal) is a canal in the eastern suburbs of Berlin, the capital city of Germany. It takes its name from the village Gosen, at the southern end of the canal. It is 4 kilometres (2.5 mi) in length and links the Dämeritzsee and Seddinsee lakes. The Dämeritzsee and Seddinsee are both navigable, with the Seddinsee providing a link to the River Dahme and the Oder-Spree Canal, and the Dämeritzsee providing a link to the Müggelspree reach of the River Spree and to the Flakensee.

Although the plan for the Gosen Canal goes back to 1872, construction did not start until 1933, and the canal opened in 1936. The principal reason for the construction was to provide an alternative route for commercial shipping between Berlin (via the Dämeritzsee) and the Oder-Spree Canal (via the Seddinsee) during the 1936 Summer Olympics, when the more normal route via the Langer See was closed in order to use the regatta course at Grünau for the Olympic canoeing and rowing events. Another explanation is that the canal was built to bring the coal from Königs Wusterhausen to the Klingenberg power station in Berlin-Rummelsburg.

The canal is navigable by boats with a draught of up to 2 metres (6 ft 7 in). It has no locks, but is crossed by a single bridge (which is planned to be rebuilt by 2022), with a maximum clearance of 4.3 metres (14 ft). Small craft are also able to navigate between the two lakes using the roughly parallel Gosener Graben.

Besides seeing considerable sightseeing and leisure traffic, the canal today also forms a link in a commercial navigation route from the limestone workings at Rüdersdorf, which reaches the Flakensee by a lock at Woltersdorf.

== Bibliography ==
- Hans-Joachim Uhlemann: Berlin und die Märkischen Wasserstraßen. transpress Verlag für Verkehrswesen, Berlin div. Jahrgänge.
- Westeuropäischer Schifffahrts- und Hafenkalender. Binnenschifffahrts-Verlag GmbH. Duisburg- Ruhrort div. Jahrgänge.
- Sportschifffahrtskarten Binnen 1 Nautische Veröffentlichung Verlagsgesellschaft, ISBN 3-926376-10-4.
