= Gänseliesel =

Fountain in Göttingen, Germany

Coordinates: 51°31′58″N 9°56′06″E

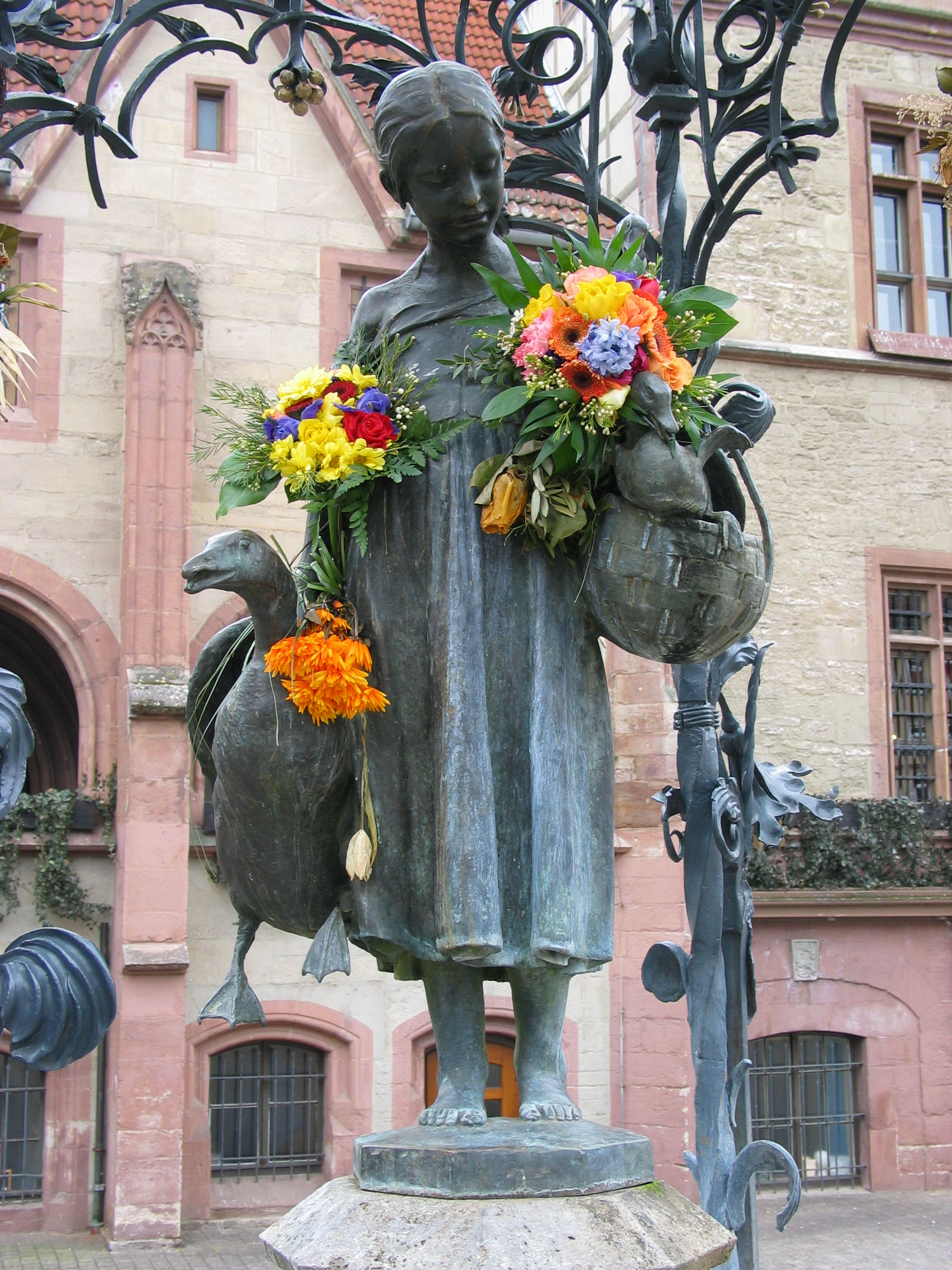
The "Gänseliesel" in front of the old town hall of Göttingen

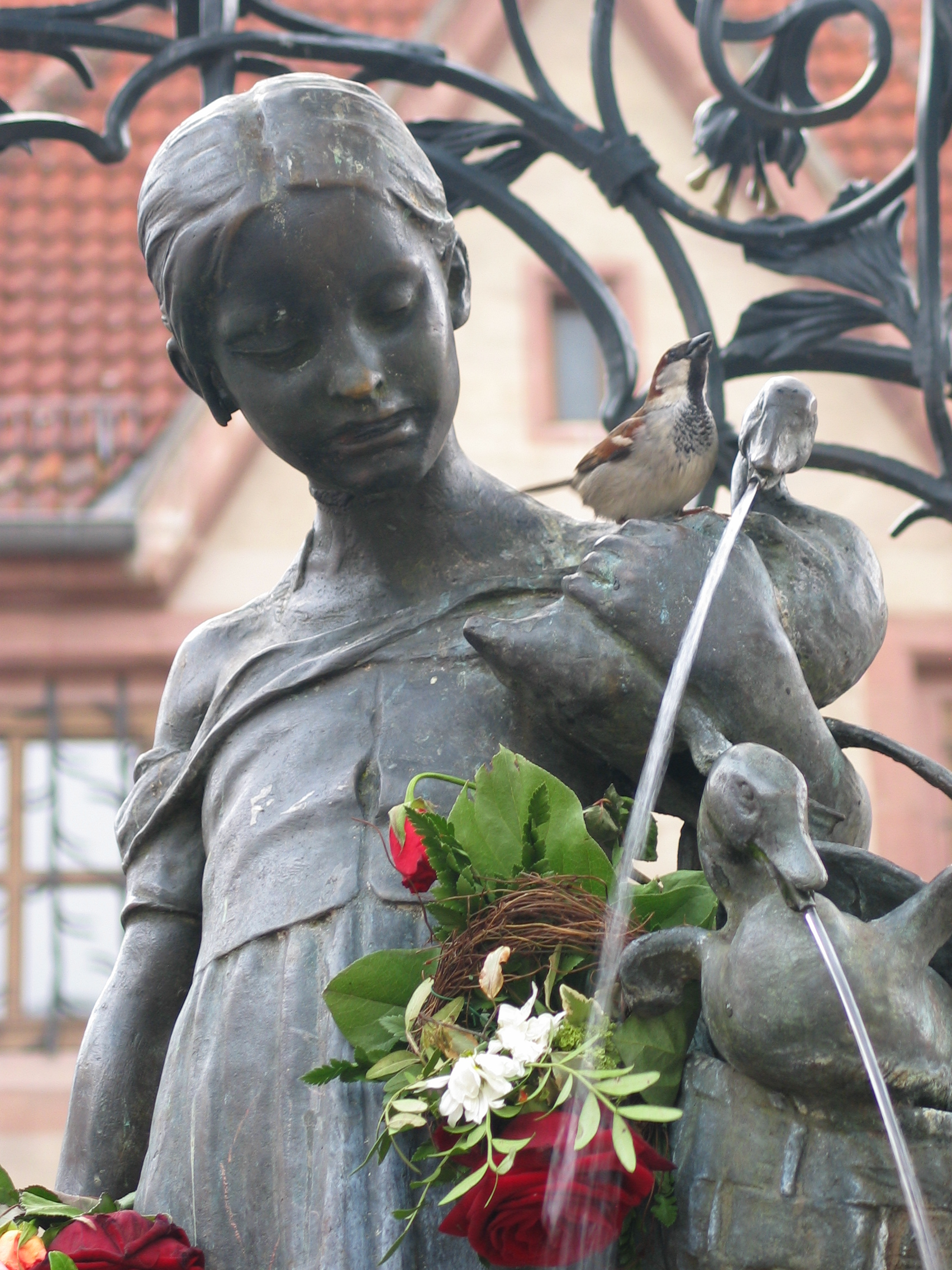

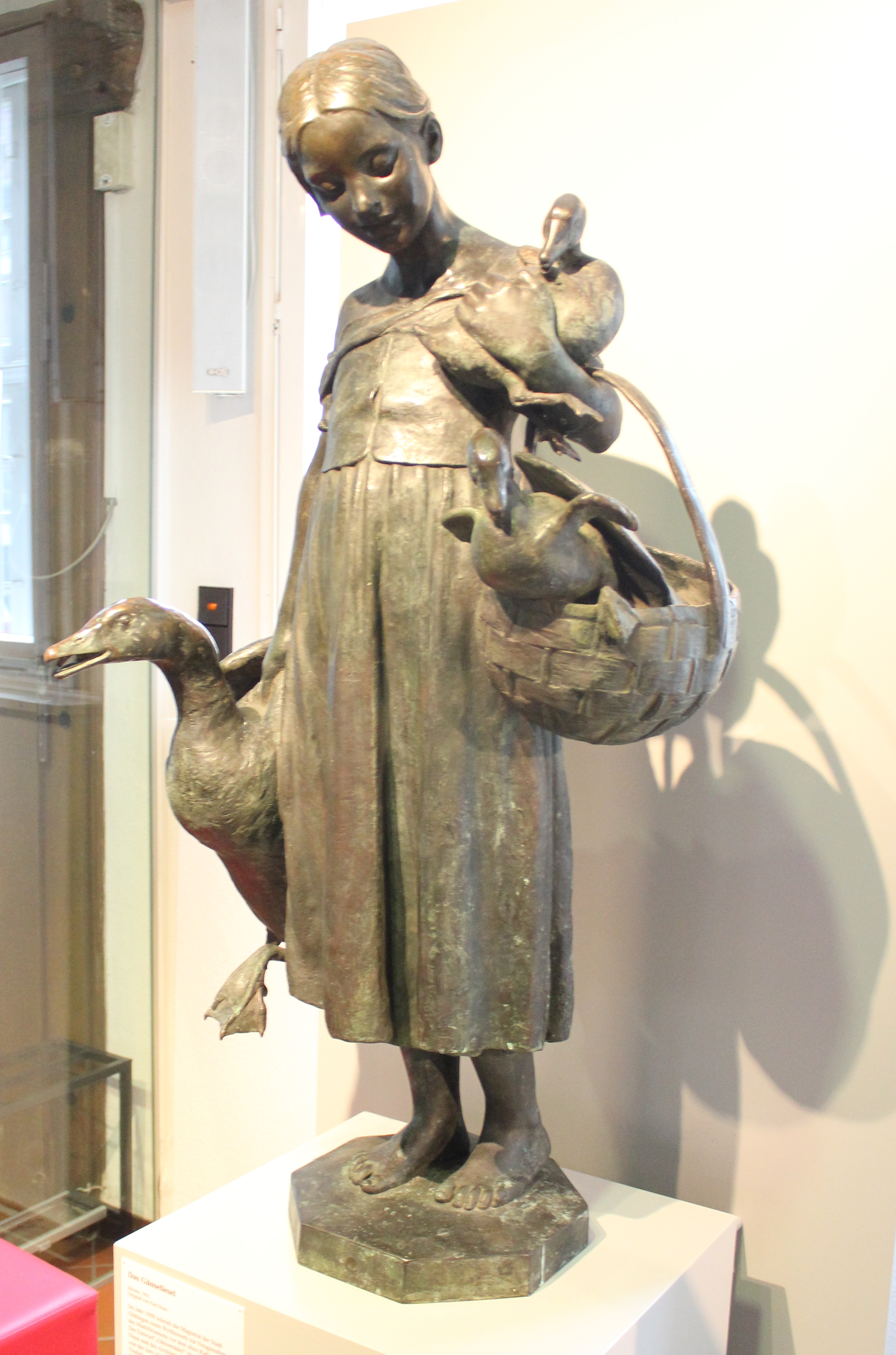
The Original of the Town Museum

The Gänseliesel (English: Goose Girl, Goose Lizzy (Liesel as pet name of Elisabeth)) is a fountain which was erected in 1901 in front of the medieval town hall of Göttingen, Germany. Although rather small in size, the fountain is the best-known landmark of the city. Today, it is an essential part of graduation celebrations, as it is traditional for students who complete a doctorate at the University of Göttingen to climb the fountain and kiss the statue of the goose girl.

A Gänseliesel is also situated in Monheim am Rhein, Hanover's Steintor Square and Berlin's Nikolsburger Square.

== History ==
As early as the 18th century, a fountain was located on the current site of the Gänseliesel. However, the old fountain was partially pulled down in the early 19th century due to deterioration. In 1898, the city council decided to construct a new fountain, for which sculptors from all over Germany presented their proposals. From all designs, the neo-gothic proposal "Im Geiste der Alten/Tugendbrunnen" ("In the Spirit of the Ancients/Fountain of Virtue") by the sculptors Mehs and Jehs was favoured, while the goose girl, designed by architect Heinrich Stöckhardt and sculpted by Paul Nisse, was ranked second place. However, after the official ranking the three best designs were put on public display. The citizens of Göttingen widely preferred the simpler design of the goose girl, perhaps because the simple girl image best represents the common people, in contrast to the numerous statues of famous university scientists found in the city. After long discussion, the Gänseliesel was finally put up in 1901 without any official ceremony. The Gänseliesel fountain does not have any particular connection to the history of the town. The original of the sculpture is today in the town's museum (Städtisches Museum).

== Traditions ==
Soon after the fountain was erected, newly enrolled students of the Georgia Augusta university began to climb up the fountain and to kiss the statue which rapidly became a university tradition. Because the climbing of the fountain was usually celebrated with excessive consumption of alcohol and loud cheers of fellow students and because the number of students largely increased after World War I, police issued a decree in 1926 that officially forbade the climbing and kissing of the statue. A law student who was prosecuted for kissing the goose girl in the same year, took the case to court. However, the superior court of justice in Berlin legitimated the edict.

The tradition itself has changed over time, and today it is unusual for first year students to kiss the statue; it is now more common to bring a bouquet of flowers to the Gänseliesel and to give her a kiss after one's official reception of the doctorate degree. It is for this reason that the fountain is decorated with flowers very frequently, and throughout the year. Until recently, climbing and kissing of the monument remained officially forbidden although both the city of Göttingen and the university advertise themselves with pictures of PhD graduates kissing the girl.

As the fountain has been subject to vandalism, the original statue of the goose girl can today be seen in the Stadtmuseum while the fountain only carries a copy. After a severe assault during the winter of 2004 (malicious arson), the fountain needed to be disassembled and underwent major restoration.

Since 1995, each year on a weekend in September the city of Göttingen stages the so-called "Gänselieselfest" in honor of the goose girl. The main event of these festivities is the election of a young woman from Göttingen as the Gänseliesel, representing the town and the statue for one year.
