= Woltersdorf Tramway =

Tramway in Brandenburg, Germany

Straßenbahn Woltersdorf
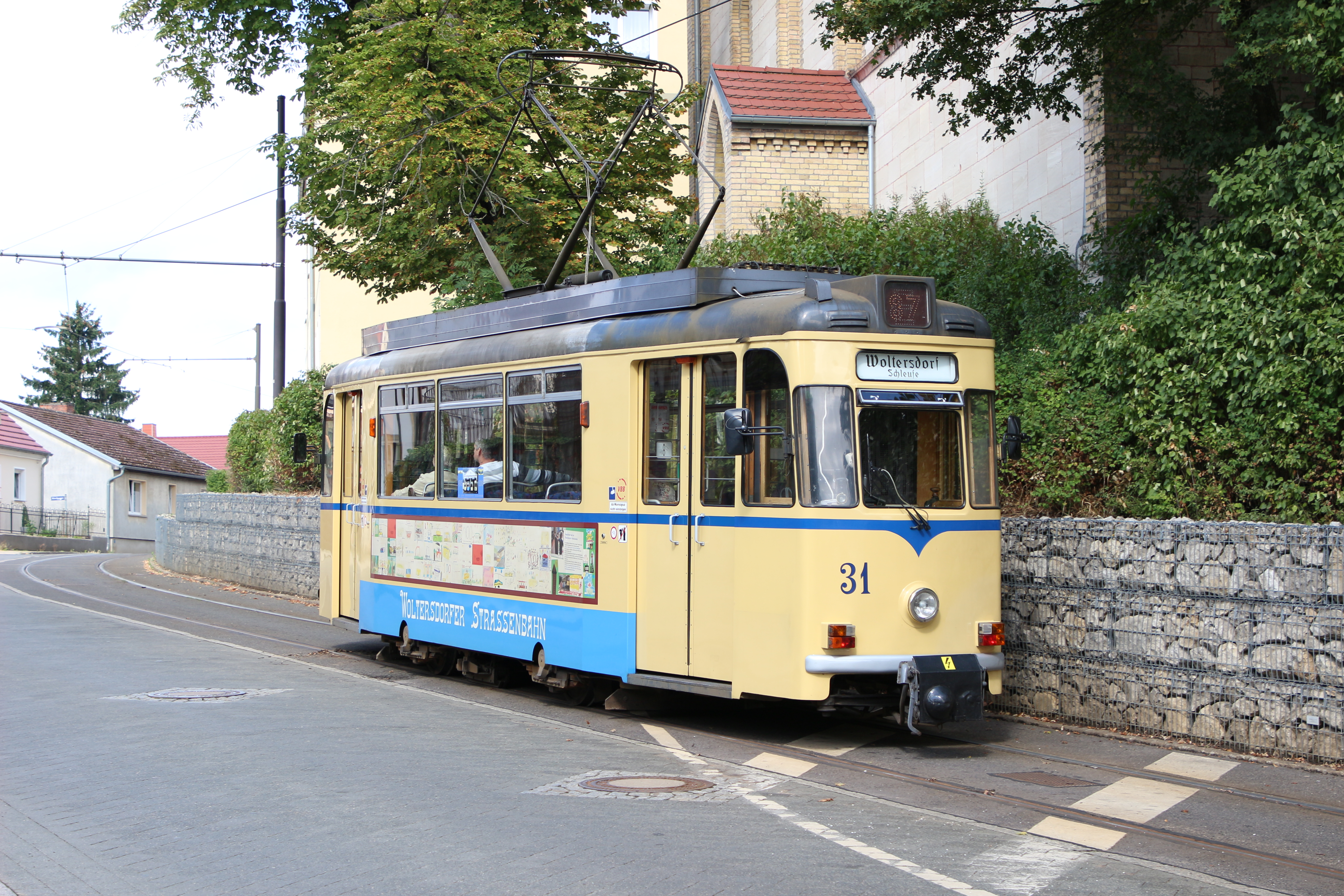

Operation
- Locale: Woltersdorf, Brandenburg
- Open: 1913
- Status: open
- Lines: 1
- Operator: Schöneicher – Rüdersdorf Strassenbahn GmbH

Infrastructure
- Track gauge: 1,435 mm (4 ft 8 1/2 in) standard gauge
- Propulsion system: Electric
- Electrification: 600v DC, Overhead line

Statistics
- Route length: 5.6km
- 630,000 p.a.
Overview
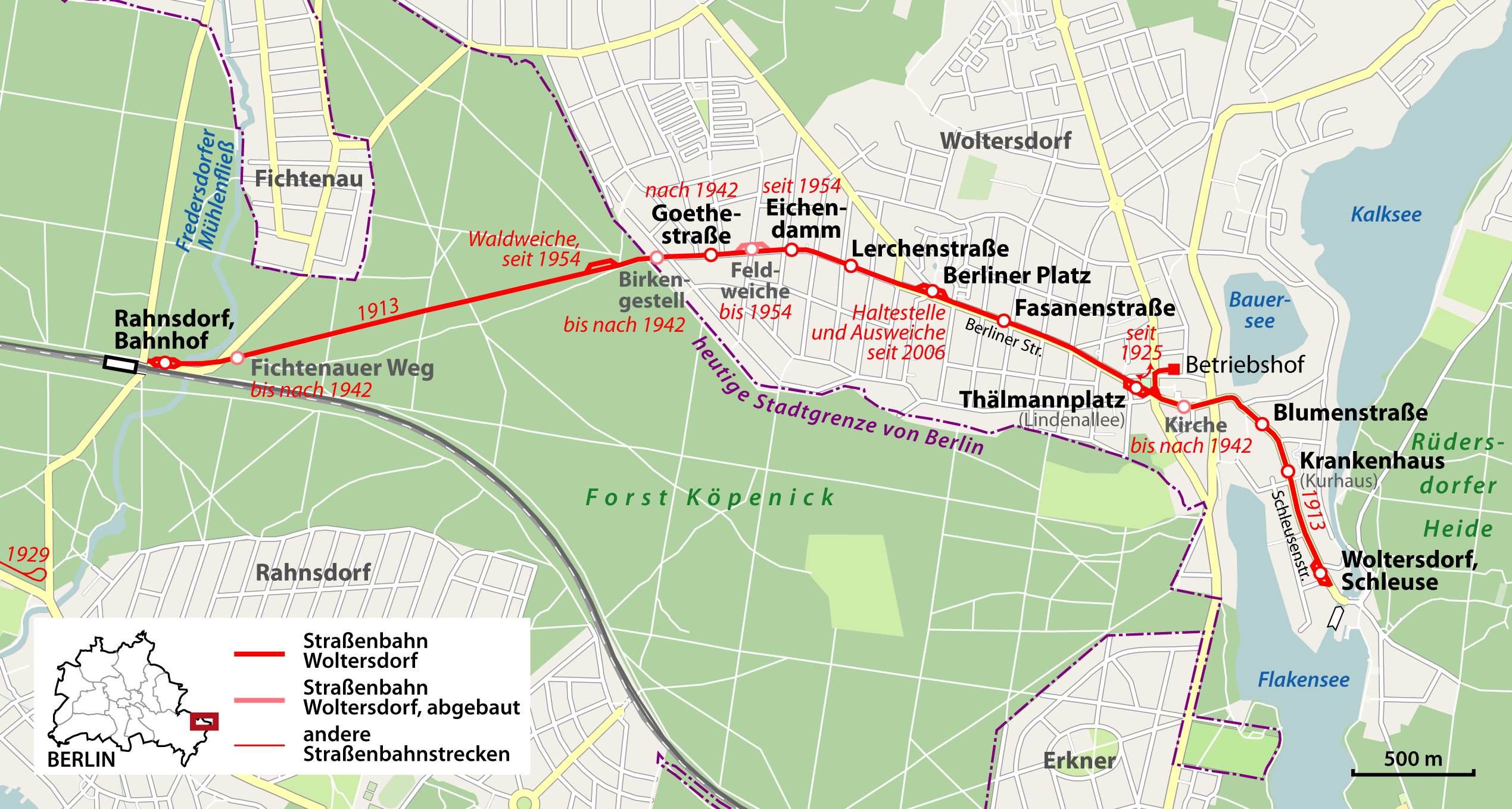
- Website: Official website

The Woltersdorf Tramway (Woltersdorfer Straßenbahn) is a standard gauge tramway, located in Woltersdorf, Brandenburg, near Berlin, Germany. The line is notable for its use of historic vehicles, using 4 wheeled trams, built in the early 1960s. The line was constructed in 1913, to connect Woltersdorf to the Berlin Suburban railways. It is one of the smallest tram operators in Germany, and has not expanded beyond its 1913 route.

== Route ==
The line starts at Berlin-Rahnsdorf station, where it connects with Berlin S-Bahn line S3. It then runs through Köpenick Forest, passing from Berlin into Brandenburg. It then travels along Berliner Strasse, into Woltersdorf. At Thälmanplatz, there is a short spur to the depot. The line then runs to Woltersdorf Hospital, before terminating at Woltersdorf, Schleuse.

== Operations ==
The line operates a 20 minute service, using two trams, with an additional tram at peak hours, giving a 10-minute service between Berliner Platz and Rahnsdorf.

The company operates from a depot in Woltersdorf, located adjacent to Thälmanplatz tram stop. The company carries out all maintenance work on its vehicles in house, except for electrical components.

== Ticketing ==
The tramway is line 87 in the VBB fare system, and VBB tickets valid in zone C can be used on the tramway.

== Vehicles ==
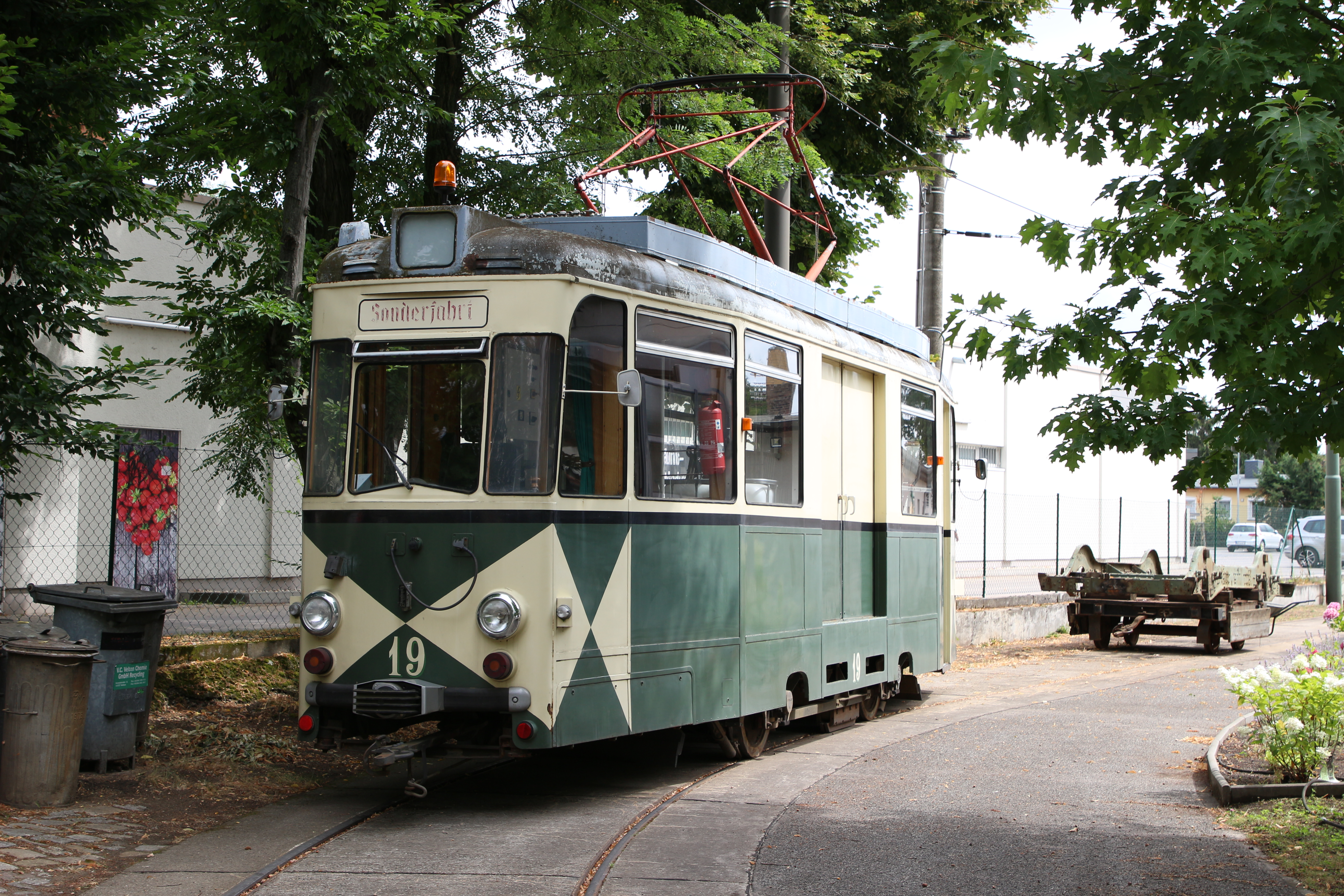
Tram 19, the Woltersdorf works car

The tramways service fleet consists of 9 Gotha/LEW vehicles, manufactured between 1957 and 1961. The tramway also maintains a fleet of 5 heritage vehicles, which are used on special occasions. The tramways works fleet consists of a converted Gotha/LEW tram, number 19, which was previously used by the BVG, along with a snowplow.

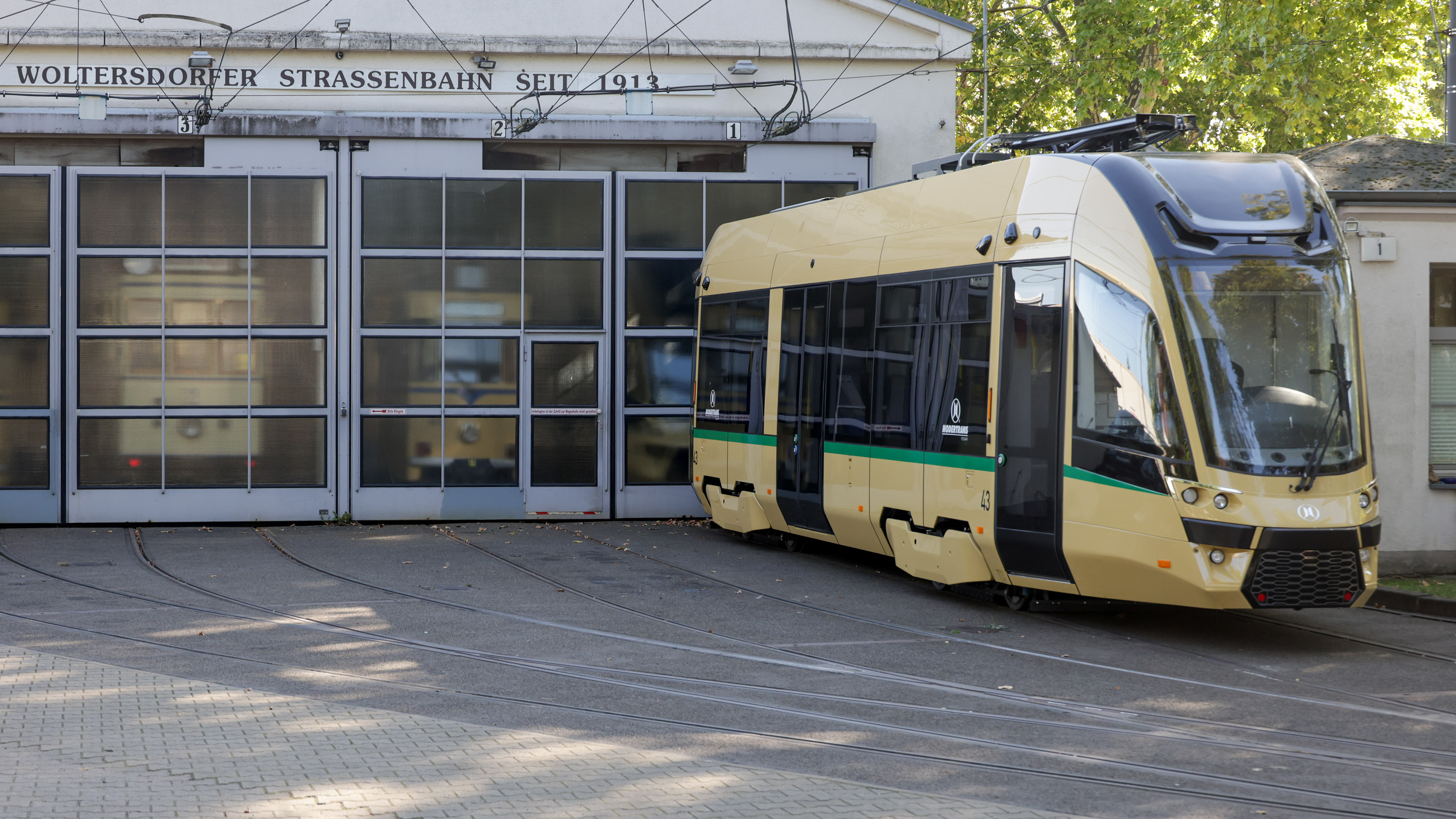
New low floor tram at the depot, September 2024

Four Moderus Gamma LF 10 AC BD trams are scheduled to be delivered to Woltersdorf from 2023. The first tram was delivered at the end of March 2024.

== See also ==
- Trams in Berlin
