= Friedrich Heinrich Stöckhardt =

German architect

Friedrich Heinrich Stöckhardt (14 August 1842 - 4 June 1920) was a German architect.

== Life and artwork ==
Heinrich Stöckhardt was born in Saint Petersburg. His father, Robert Stöckhardt, had been appointed there as professor of Roman law. After the father's early death in 1848 his widow, Emilie née Voigt, returned with her children to Naumburg. Heinrich was educated to open mindedness to art, as both his father as well as family members of his mother were great music lovers. The father composed himself and was acquainted with Clara Schumann. An uncle, Carl Friedrich Eduard Voigt, sponsored the Leipzig Gewandhaus Orchestra and was acquainted with Robert Schumann. In later years, one of Heinrich's brothers became a composer and one sister became a painter.

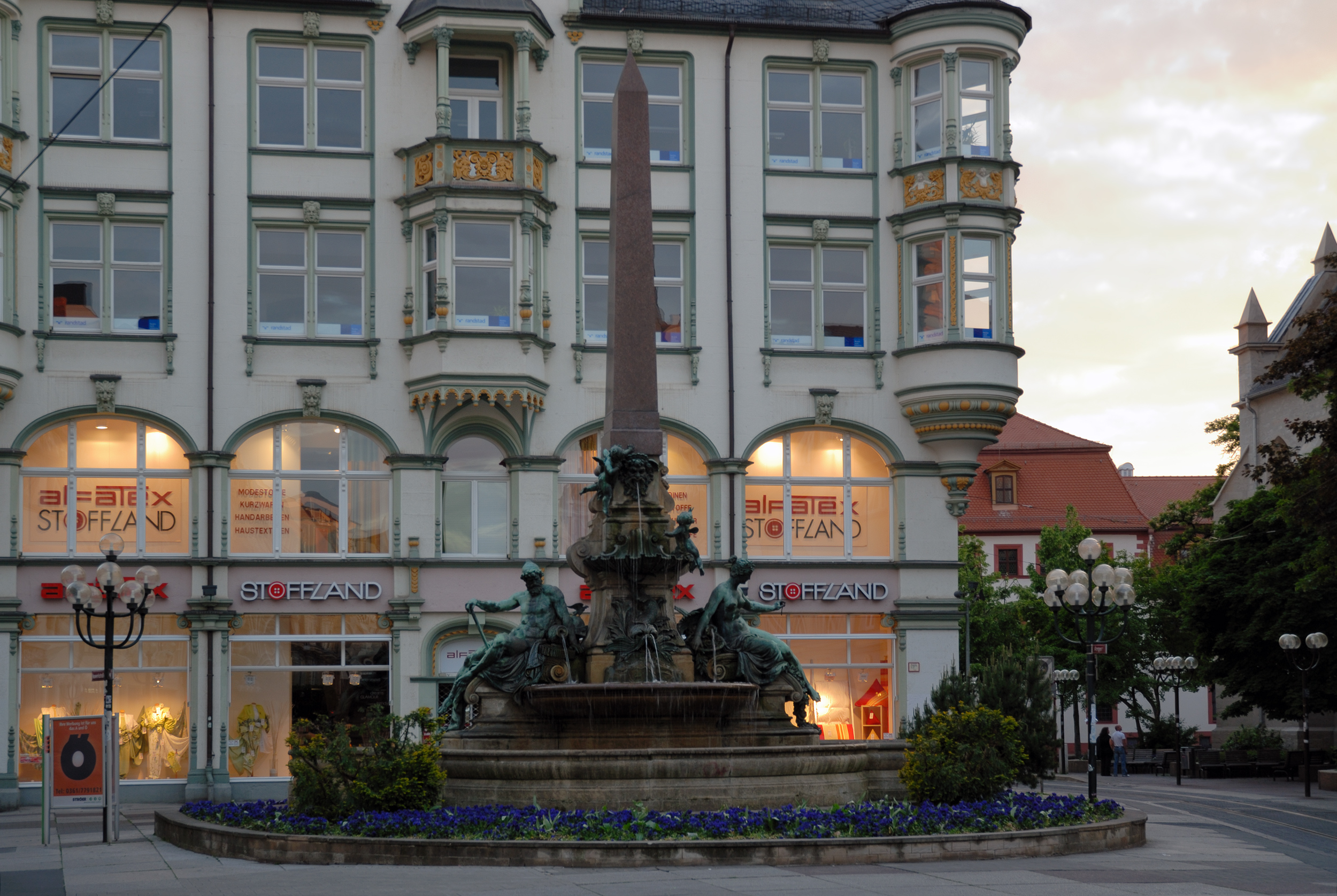
Fountain at the Anger, Erfurt's main place

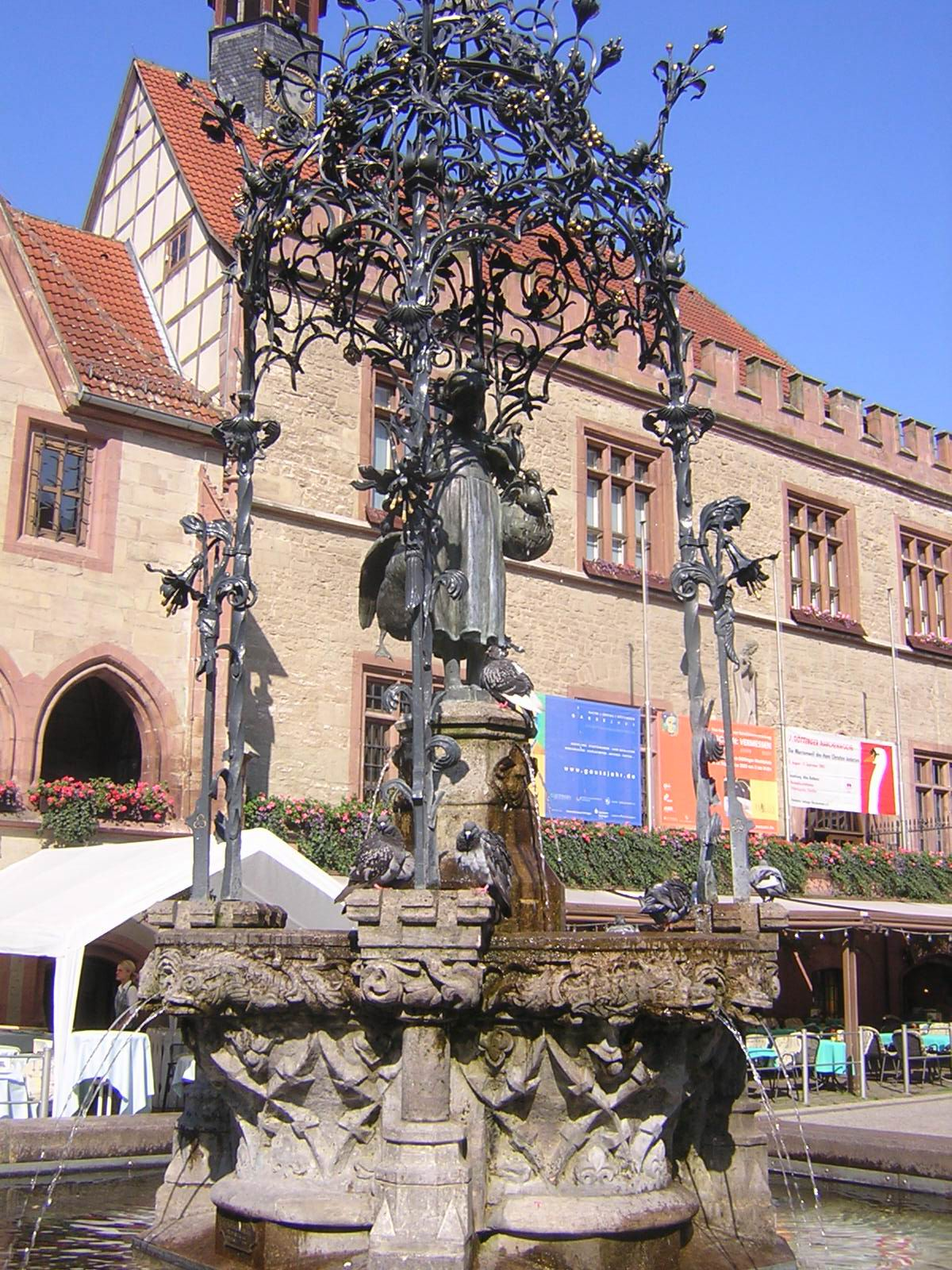
Gänseliesel, Göttingen's landmark

He studied at Georg Hermann Nicolai in Dresden, where he worked till 1869. In 1871 he joined the Rathaus-Atelier of Hermann Friedrich Waesemann. Later, Stöckhardt became assistant and lecturer at the Technische Hochschule Charlottenburg. He was appointed professor in 1911.

Stöckhardt is especially known for his fountain designs. In 1882 he had already won the competition for the Mendebrunnen in Leipzig, but remained unconsidered. In 1890 two important fountains were inaugurated, in Erfurt at the city's main place Anger, and in Dessau a fountain monument memorizing Moses Mendelssohn. Stöckhardt's best known work, however, followed in 1901. The Gänseliesel fountain is today Göttingen's landmark.

Stöckhardt died 1920 in Woltersdorf, Brandenburg, where his villa is used today as a private school.
