= Erkner =

- Town
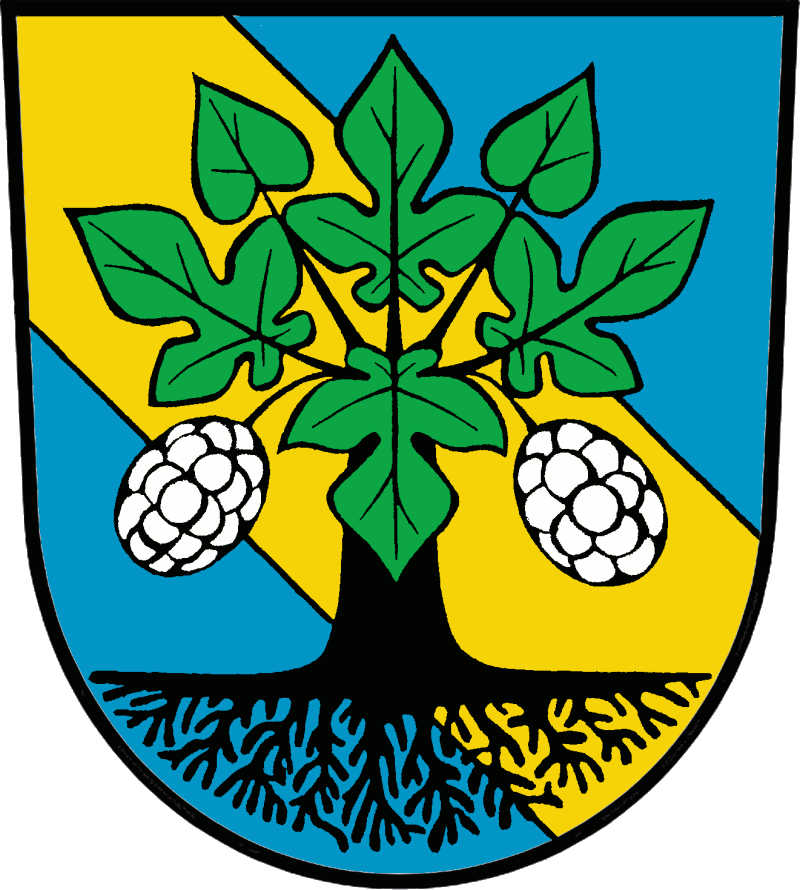
- Coat of arms

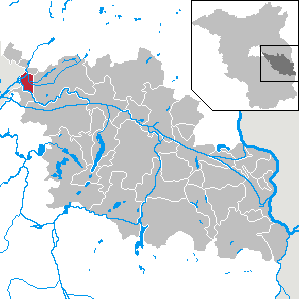
- Location of Erkner within Oder-Spree district
- Interactive map of Erkner
- Location within Germany Location within Brandenburg
- Coordinates: 52°25′N 13°45′E
- Country: Germany
- State: Brandenburg
- District: Oder-Spree

Government
  - Mayor (2018–26): Henryk Pilz

Area
  - Total: 16.53 km^{2} (6.38 sq mi)
- Elevation: 40 m (130 ft)

Population (2025-12-31)
  - Total: 11,523
  - Density: 697.1/km^{2} (1,805/sq mi)
- Time zone: UTC+01:00 (CET)
  - Summer (DST): UTC+02:00 (CEST)
- Postal codes: 15537
- Dialling codes: 03362
- Vehicle registration: LOS
- Website: www.erkner.de

Erkner (German pronunciation: [ˈɛʁknɐ]) is a town in the Oder-Spree District of Brandenburg, Germany, located on the south-eastern edge of the German capital city Berlin.

== Geography ==
The town is located between the lakes Dämeritzsee, a part of the river Spree, and Flakensee, surrounded by a mainly forested landscape. Neighbouring municipalities are Woltersdorf in the north, Grünheide (Mark) in the east, Gosen-Neu Zittau in the south and Berlin in the west.

== History ==
In 1579, Erkner was first mentioned in the Rüdersdorf church records as "Arckenow", a fishermen's place of residence („Mittwoch s post Convers, Pauli hat Hans der Fischer im Arckenow taufen lassen Und ist genant Maria.“). This field name developed to Erkenau-Erkener-Erkner. Until 1701 the settlement only had seven houses.

This changed in 1712, when a coaching inn for the new Post road from Berlin to Frankfurt (Oder) was built. As of 1748, three Palatine farming families settled "on the Buchhorst" (a locality within Erkner). Later they moved their homesteads to the present-day Buchhorster Straße. One of those homesteads now houses the Heimatmuseum (local history museum) with Erkner's oldest house.
In 1752, Prussian king Friedrich II installed a Mulberry plantation with 1,500 trees, of which only one is still standing in today's Friedrichstraße.

From 1815 to 1947, Erkner was part of the Prussian Province of Brandenburg.

The village grew up to 260 inhabitants in 1805. At this time Erkner was a barge-men's village with several localities: „The Erkner“, Neu Buchhorst, Schönschornstein, Alte Hausstelle, Hohenbinde, Jägerbude and until 1884 Woltersdorfer Schleuse. Along the waterways between the rivers Oder, Spree, Havel and Elbe, were mass transports of lime, coal and other materials from the limestone mine in nearby Rüdersdorf to Berlin and from the industrial areas of Silesia to Berlin respectively. In 1822, two thirds of the families had a barge-men as head of the household. Supported also by five wharfs in the village, this profession continued to be important for Erkner until the end of the 19th century.

In 1842, the Berlin-Frankfurt Railway opened with a stop in Erkner, which was upgraded to a railway station the following year due to the large number of excursionists from Berlin. From 1846, this railway connected Berlin via Erkner with Breslau and thereby two important industrial areas of Prussia.

The industrialisation of Erkner began in 1860 with the founding of the first Continental European tar production unit by Julius Rütgers. In 1909, the world's first industrialised production of Plastics (Bakelite) began on his premises in cooperation with Leo Baekeland. On May 25, 1910 the Bakelite Gesellschaft m.b.H. Berlin-Erkner (Link to German Wikipedia) was founded here. A few months later, on October 10, Baekeland founded the General Bakelite Company in Perth Amboy, New Jersey.

From 1885 to 1889 the German writer and later Nobel laureate Gerhard Hauptmann lived in Erkner, incorporating several local people and places into his stories. His three sons were born at this time. In 1888, the town officially adopted the name Erkner. The Catholic parish St. Boniface Erkner was founded in 1910.

From 1947 to 1952, Erkner was part of the State of Brandenburg, from 1952 to 1990 of the Bezirk Frankfurt of East Germany and since 1990 again of Brandenburg.

On June 6, 1998 Erkner was the first town in Eastern Germany to be granted city rights after the German Reunification.

== Demography ==
Development of Population since 1875 within the Current Boundaries (Blue Line: Population; Dotted Line: Comparison to Population Development of Brandenburg state; Grey Background: Time of Nazi rule; Red Background: Time of Communist rule)

Recent Population Development and Projections (Population Development before Census 2011 (blue line); Recent Population Development according to the Census in Germany in 2011 (blue bordered line); Official projections for 2005-2030 (yellow line); for 2017-2030 (scarlet line); for 2020-2030 (green line)

Erkner: Population development
within the current boundaries (2020)

Year	Pop.	±% p.a.
1875	1,165	—
1890	2,295	+4.62%
1910	3,844	+2.61%
1925	5,703	+2.66%
1939	8,234	+2.66%
1950	6,631	−1.95%
1964	8,330	+1.64%

Year	Pop.	±% p.a.
1971	8,391	+0.10%
1981	12,313	+3.91%
1985	12,867	+1.11%
1990	12,158	−1.13%
1995	11,802	−0.59%
2000	12,128	+0.55%
2005	11,829	−0.50%

Year	Pop.	±% p.a.
2010	11,580	−0.42%
2015	11,668	+0.15%
2016	11,695	+0.23%
2017	11,818	+1.05%
2018	11,815	−0.03%
2019	11,856	+0.35%
2020	11,935	+0.67%

== Twinned Towns ==
Erkner is a twin town of Gołuchów in the Greater Poland Voivodeship.

== Culture and Sights ==
=== Museums ===
- Gerhart-Hauptmann-Museum, hosting a permanent exhibition about the life and work of Gerhart Hauptmann (writer and winner of the Nobel Prize in Literature), and a research library.
- Heimatmuseum, local history museum with a permanent exhibition about the history of Erkner and since 2008 hosting an additional exhibition about the town's industrial development.

=== Churches ===
- Protestant Genezareth Church (built 1896, destroyed March 8, 1944, rebuilt 1945-46)
- Catholic St. Boniface Church (built 1932, destroyed March 8, 1944, rebuilt 1949)
- New Apostolic Church (built 1996)

=== Memorials ===
- Memorial to all victims of fascism, war and tyranny on the corner of Neu-Zittauer Straße and Hohenbinder Weg.

== Photo Gallery ==
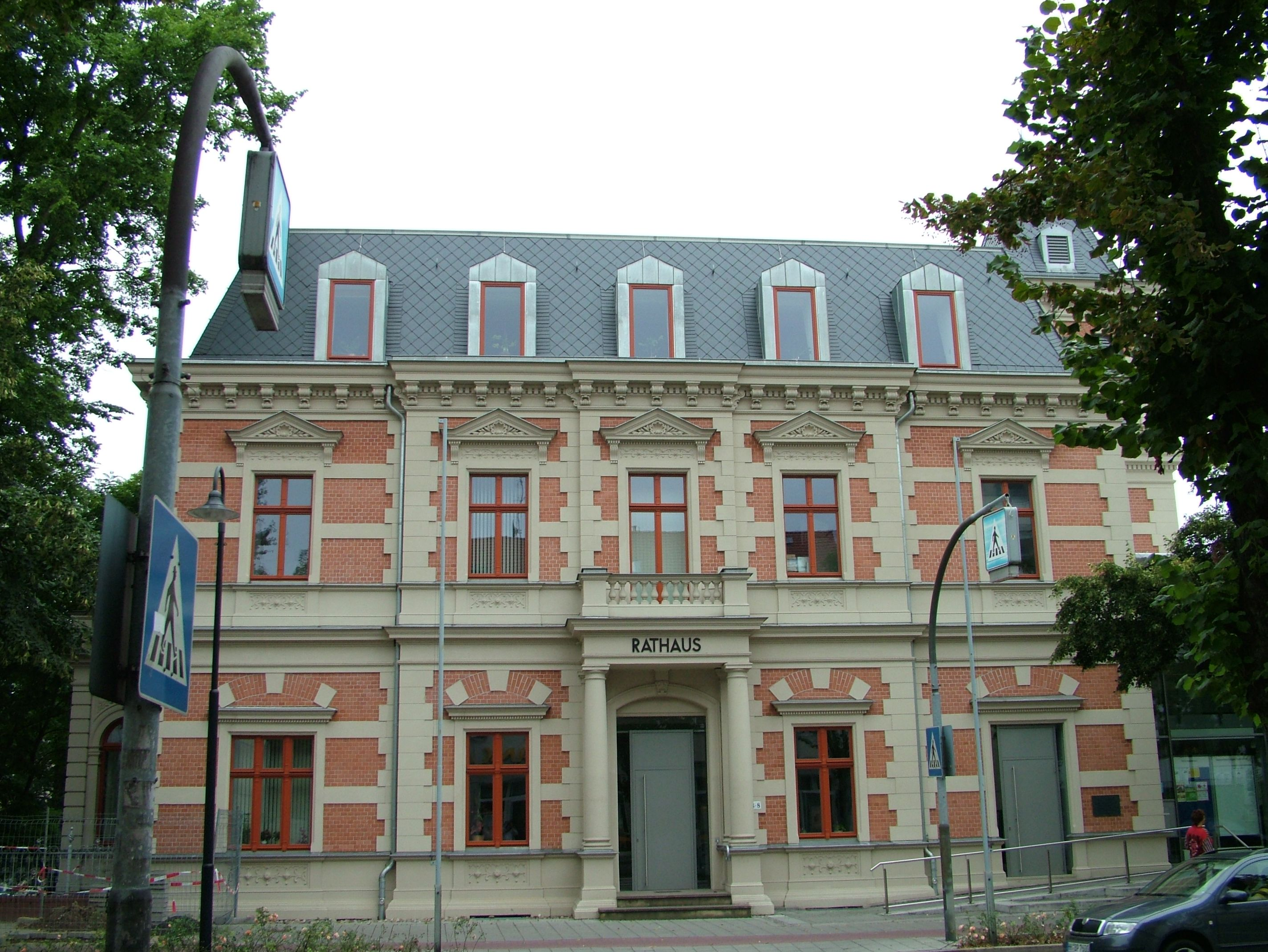
City Hall

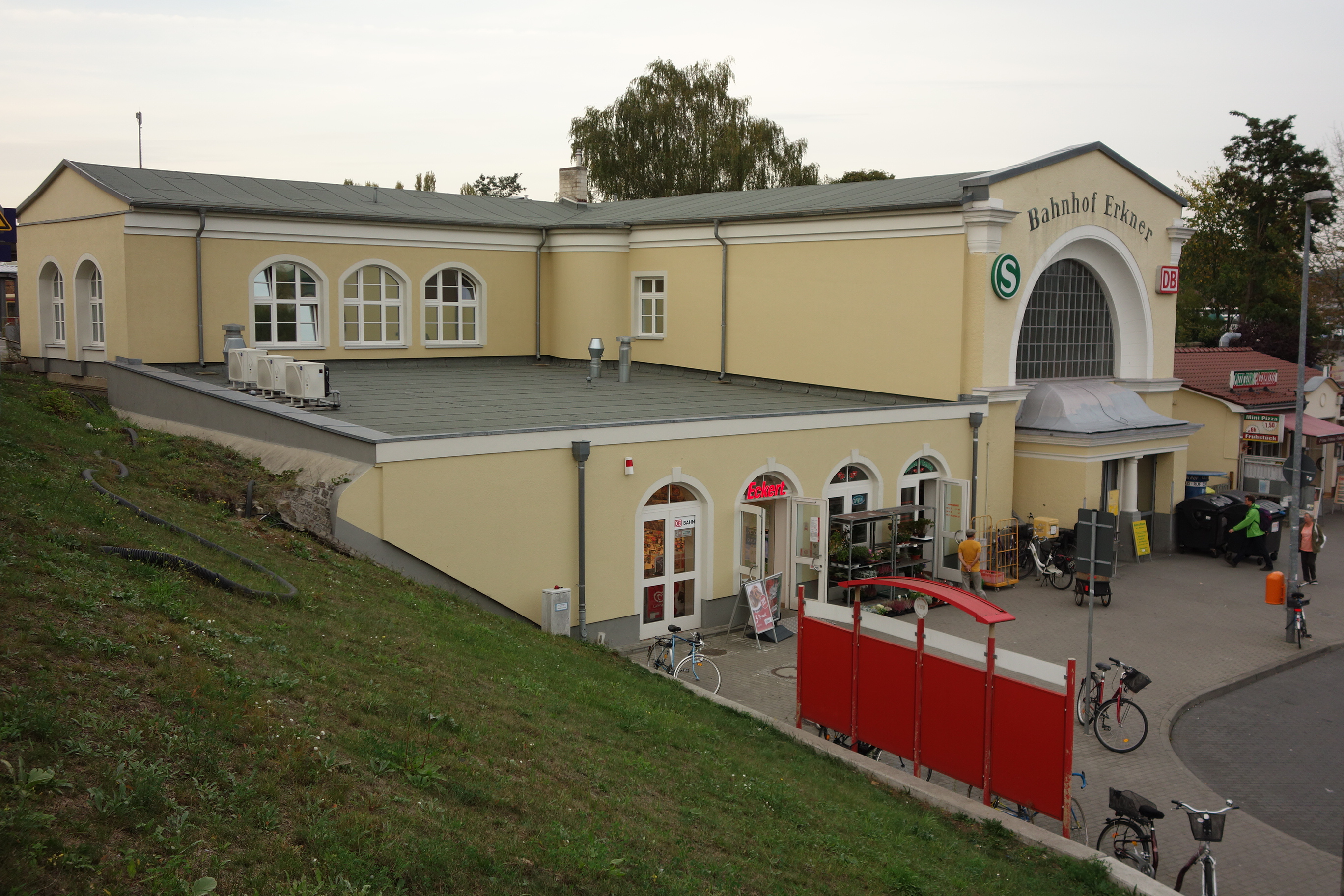
Railway Station

== Personalities ==
=== Honorary citizen ===
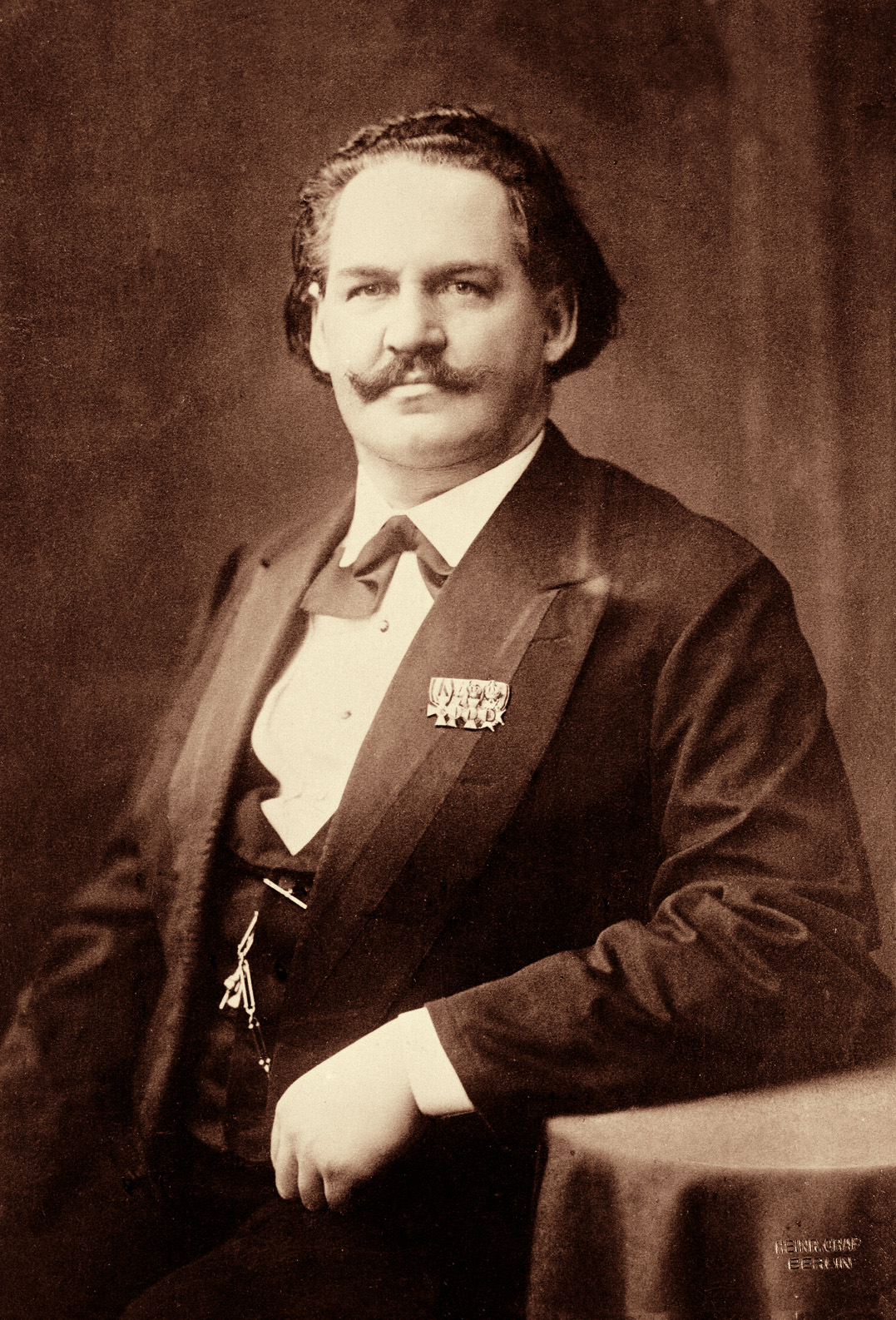
Carl Bechstein

- Carl Bechstein (1826-1900), piano and grand piano maker, honorary citizen since 1893, his former villa now serves as the town hall
- Bernd Rühle (1932–2014), local historian, principal of the cultural office and of the museum of local history, honorary citizen since 2003

=== Sons and daughters of the city ===
- Ivo Hauptmann (1886-1973), painter, oldest son of Gerhart Hauptmann
- Horst Seeger (1926-1999), musicologist, opera director

=== People associated with Erkner ===
- Gerhart Hauptmann (1862-1946), Literature Nobel Prize Laureate, lived from 1885 to 1889 in Erkner. His three sons were born in Erkner. Numerous works by Hauptmann are set in or around Erkner.
- Walter Sawall (1899-1953), two-time world champion in motor-paced racing, lived and died in Erkner, a street is named after him since 1932

== See also ==
- Erkner station
- Dämeritzsee
