= Woltersdorf, Brandenburg =

Woltersdorf
- Municipality
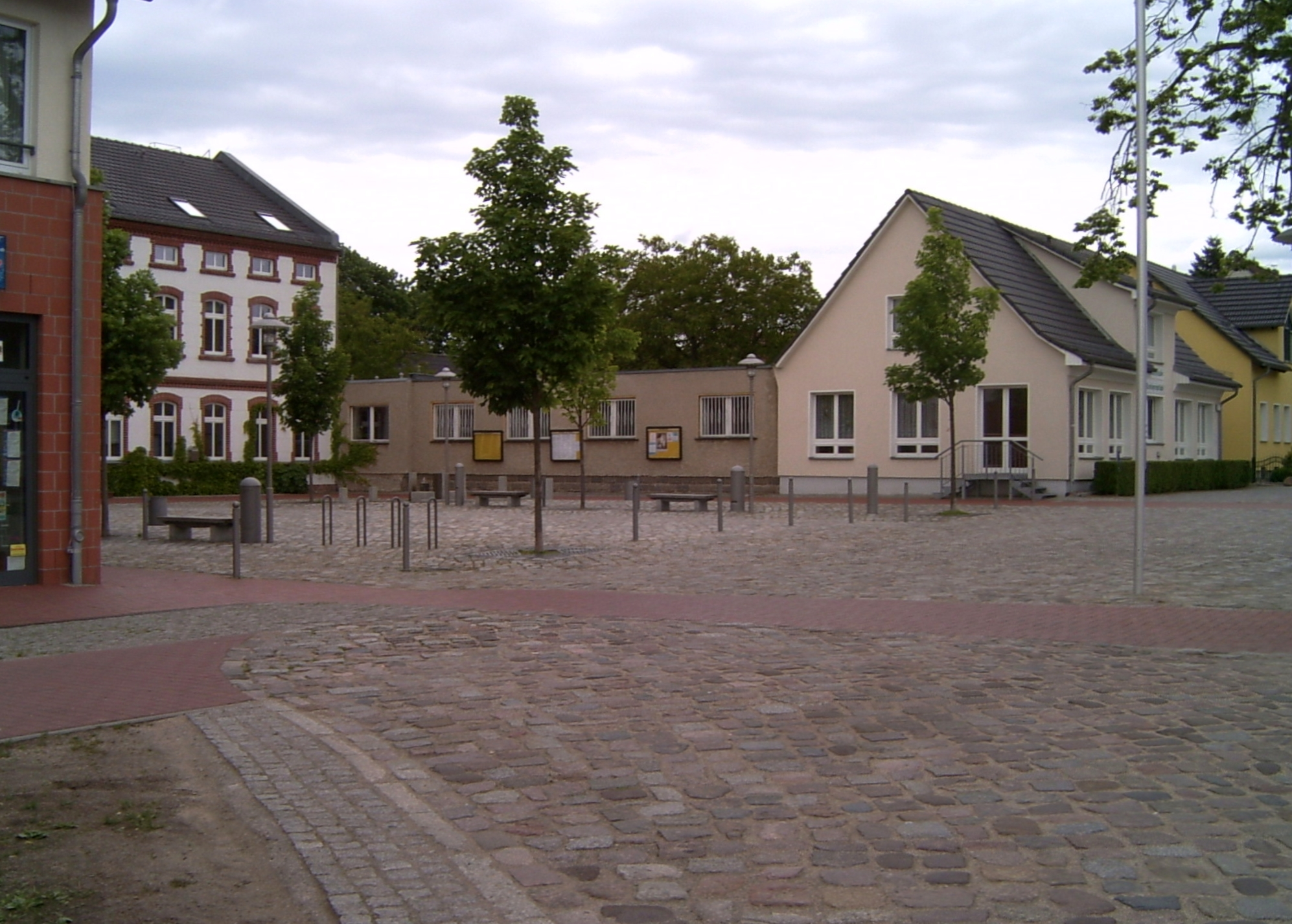
- New commune center with the town hall in the background

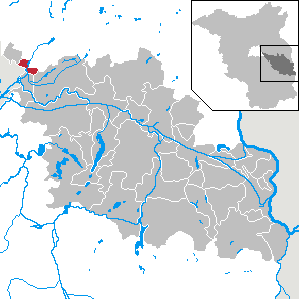
- Location of Woltersdorf within Oder-Spree district
- Interactive map of Woltersdorf
- Location within Germany Location within Brandenburg
- Coordinates: 52°26′52″N 13°45′26″E
- Country: Germany
- State: Brandenburg
- District: Oder-Spree

Government
  - Mayor (2021–29): Christian Stauch (SPD)

Area
  - Total: 9.12 km^{2} (3.52 sq mi)
- Elevation: 50 m (160 ft)

Population (2025-12-31)
  - Total: 8,353
  - Density: 916/km^{2} (2,370/sq mi)
- Time zone: UTC+01:00 (CET)
  - Summer (DST): UTC+02:00 (CEST)
- Postal codes: 15569
- Dialling codes: 03362
- Vehicle registration: LOS
- Website: www.woltersdorf-schleuse.de

Woltersdorf (German pronunciation: [ˈvɔltɐsdɔʁf]) is a municipality in the Oder-Spree district in Brandenburg. It is often referred to as "near Berlin" (German: "bei Berlin") or "near Erkner" (German: "bei Erkner") as there are a number of other places bearing the same name in Germany.

== Geography ==
The municipality is located at the three lakes Flakensee, Kalksee and the Bauernsee, between Schöneiche, the Berlin forest and Erkner.

=== Bordering municipalities ===
Woltersdorf borders (in clockwise direction, starting in north) on Rüdersdorf, Erkner, Berlin and Schöneiche.

== History ==
Around 1240 14 farmer families settled on a bank. Today the church, the city hall and the "old school" (German "alte Schule") are located here, representing the Woltersdorf "downtown". The first residents were farmers and mariners. In 1319 Woltersdorf was first documented as Waltersdorf slawika. Waltersdorf means "the village from Walter". In 1375 Woltersdorf was first noted in the "Landbuch". Together with Rahnsdorf, it paid taxes for the castle of Köpenick.

In 1487 Berlin acquired Woltersdorf. Then in 1550 a lock was built between the Flakensee and the Kalksee, the same year the first church of Woltersdorf was built. Between 1618 till 1648 Woltesdorf was desolated (Thirty Years' War) and temporarily uninhabited. About 1886 a touristic observation tower is built on top of the Kranichsberge. It granted a great perspective from a height of 105 meters, and on clear days you were able to see the Berliner Fernsehturm. Inside the tower today is an exhibition "When Woltersdorf still was Hollywood" (German "Als Woltersdorf noch Hollywood war"). It recalls the 1920s, where Joe May shot famous movies (Das indische Grabmal (1920), Herrin der Welt (1919) and Der Tiger von Eschnapur). Today you are able to find remains of the movie scenery on site.

At the end of the 19th century the rail from Berlin to the east was finished. In the bordering commune of Woltersdorf, Erkner, a train station was built. Many Berlin people had their summer residence in Woltersdorf. Since 1913 a tramway has run between the lock and the S-Bahn station of Rahnsdorf.

== Demography ==
At the time of the German reunification, 4,790 people lived in Woltersdorf. Since then, the population of Woltersdorf has risen from 6,800 (2001) to nearly 8,000 (2010). Today, Woltersdorf is the youngest commune in the Oder-Spree district. More than 12% of the population is younger than 15 years of age.

Development of population since 1875 within the current Boundaries (Blue Line: Population; Dotted Line: Comparison to Population development in Brandenburg state; Grey Background: Time of Nazi Germany; Red Background: Time of communist East Germany)

Recent Population Development and Projections (Population Development before Census 2011 (blue line); Recent Population Development according to the Census in Germany in 2011 (blue bordered line); Official projections for 2005-2030 (yellow line); for 2017-2030 (scarlet line); for 2020-2030 (green line)

Woltersdorf: Population development
within the current boundaries (2020)

Year	Pop.	±% p.a.
1875	728	—
1890	1,323	+4.06%
1910	2,517	+3.27%
1925	3,348	+1.92%
1939	6,071	+4.34%
1950	6,202	+0.19%
1964	6,156	−0.05%

Year	Pop.	±% p.a.
1971	6,109	−0.11%
1981	5,520	−1.01%
1985	5,318	−0.93%
1990	4,902	−1.62%
1995	5,007	+0.42%
2000	6,799	+6.31%
2005	7,564	+2.16%

Year	Pop.	±% p.a.
2010	7,802	+0.62%
2015	8,092	+0.73%
2016	8,163	+0.88%
2017	8,193	+0.37%
2018	8,259	+0.81%
2019	8,302	+0.52%
2020	8,423	+1.46%

== Politics ==
The City Council has 18 members, one however has not accepted his seat which remains vacant.

- CDU: 4
- SPD: 3
- Linkspartei: 4
- Grüne: 1
- FDP: 1
- WBF (Woltersdorf Citizens' Forum): 3
- NPD: 1

(Election 2008)

- Elections 2014
- Unser Woltersdorf (UW): 5 (+5)
- Woltersdorfer Bürgerforum (WBF): 4 (+1)
- The Left: 3 (-1)
- CDU: 2 (-2)
- SPD: 1 (-2)
- FDP: 1
- Greens: 1
- Single candidate Siegfried Bronsert: 1

== Famous people ==
- Politician (SPD) and biologist Regine Hildebrandt (1941–2001)
- Painter and Illustrator Fidus (1868–1948)
- Footballer Bodo Rudwaleit (born 1957)
- Entertainer Dagmar Frederic (born 1945)
- Founder of the Wilhelmsbad Woltersdorf, Dr.med. Alfred Pritzel
- Musician Chris Corner (founding member and former lead singer of Sneaker Pimps, currently involved in the IAMX project) (born 1974)
- Architect Friedrich Heinrich Stöckhardt (1842–1920)
