= Berlin =

Capital and largest city of Germany

- Capital city, state and municipality
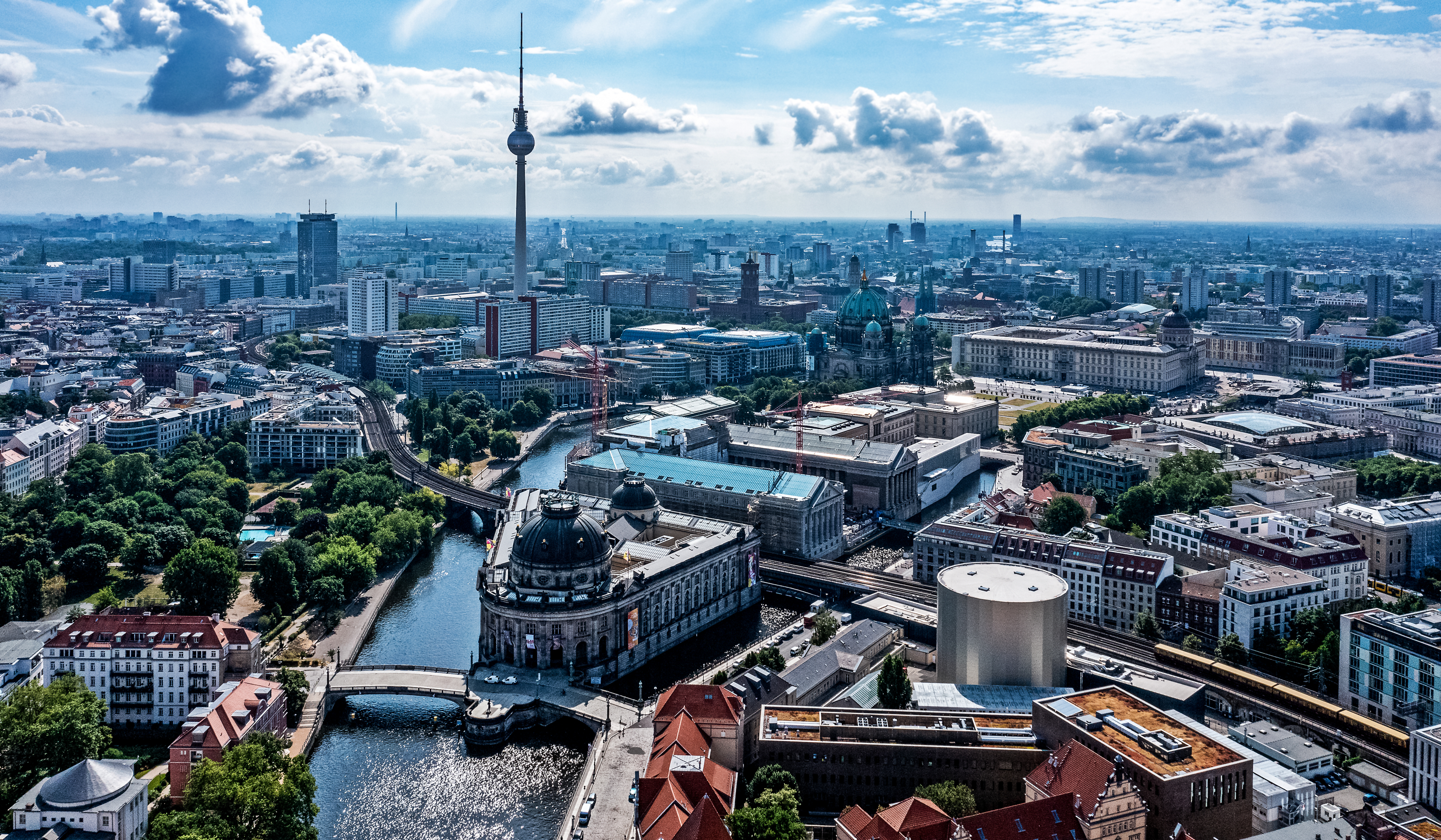
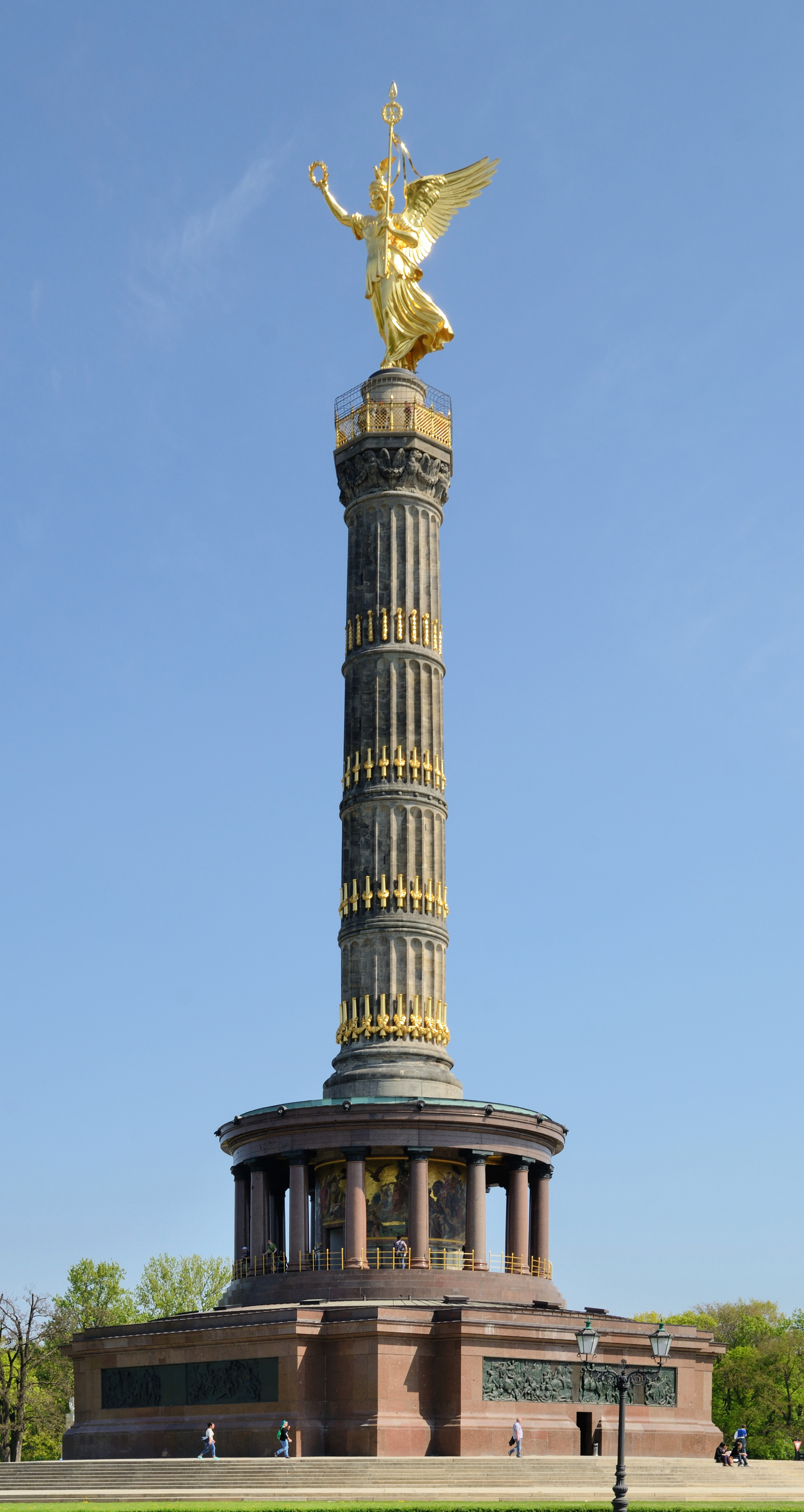
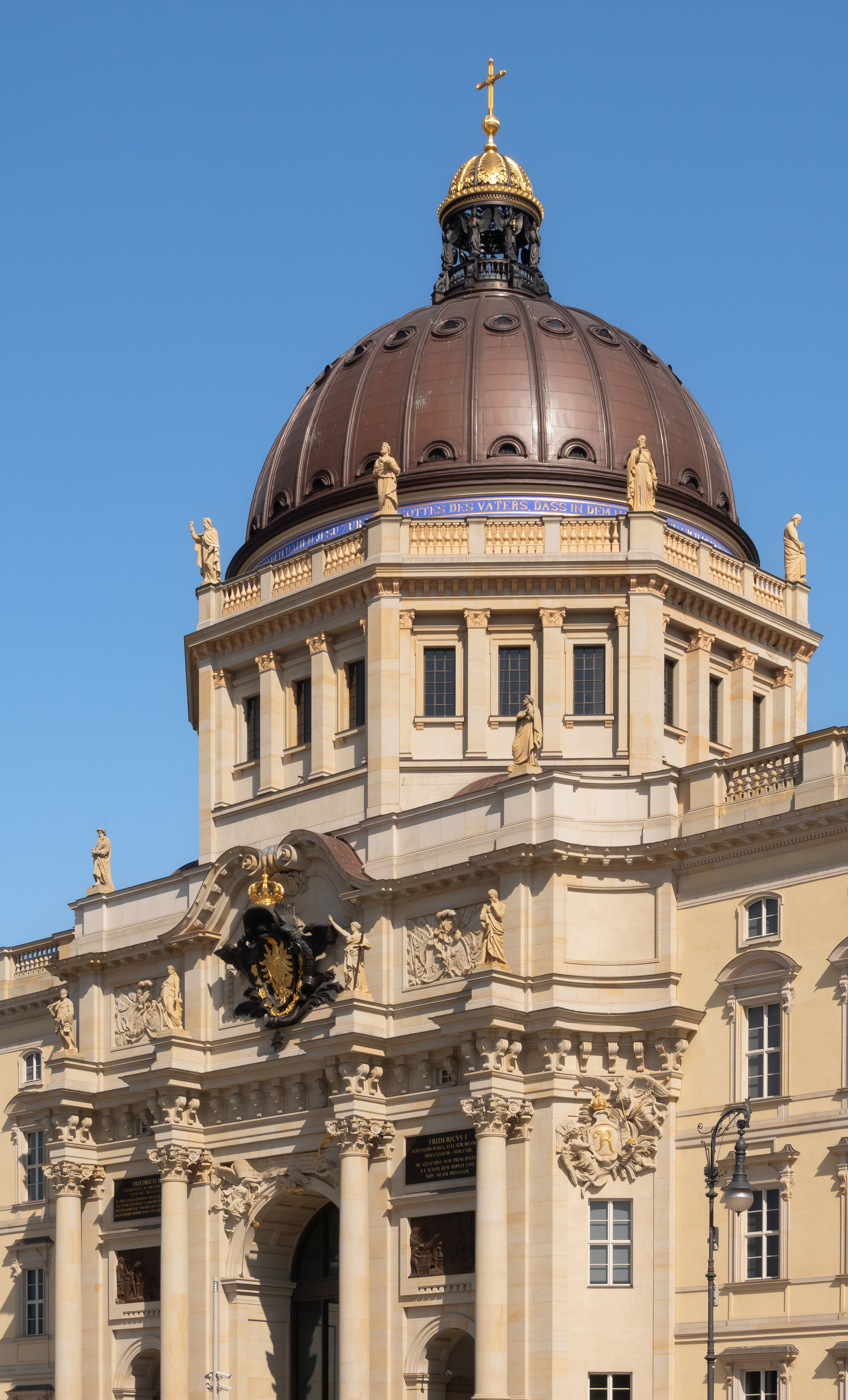
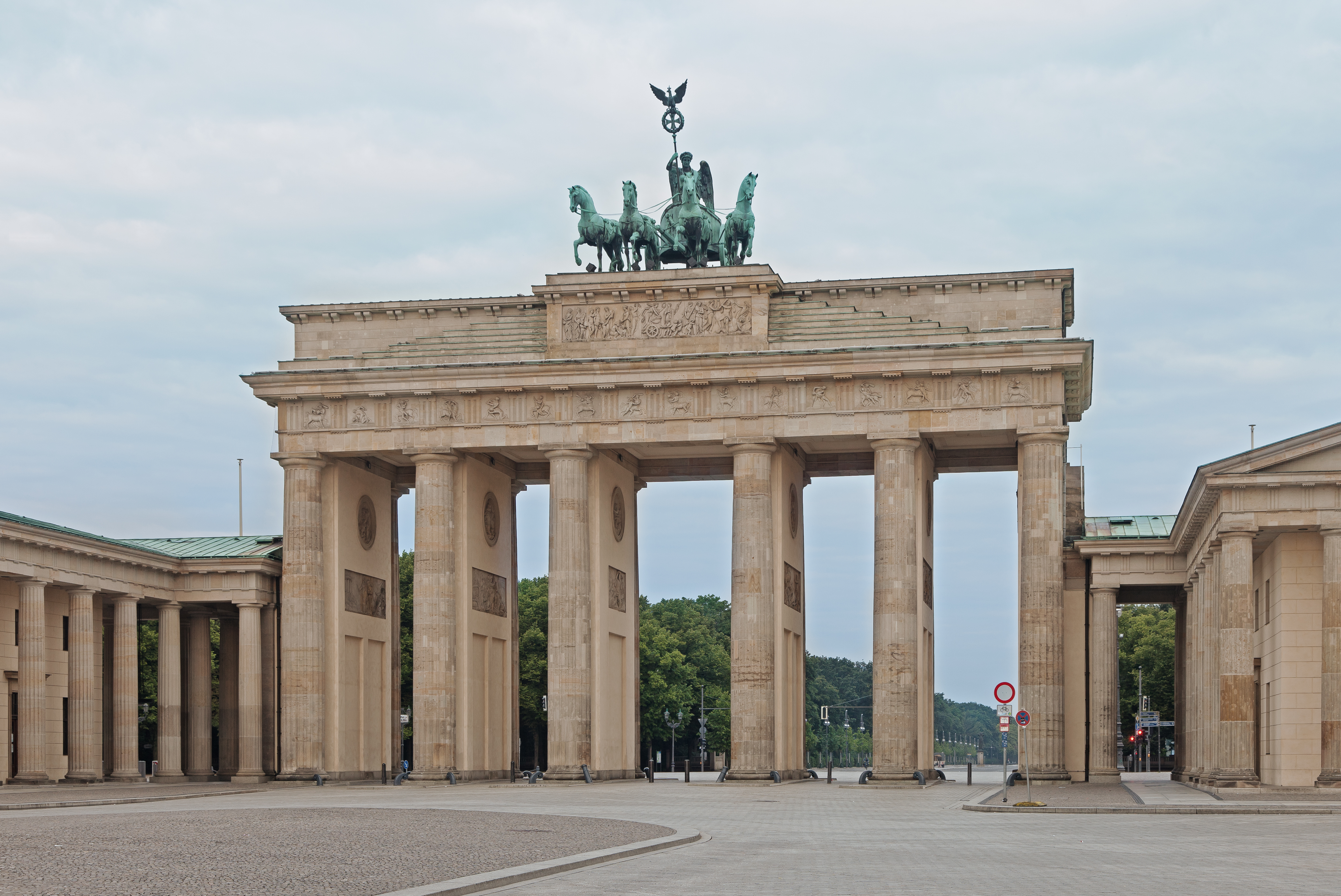
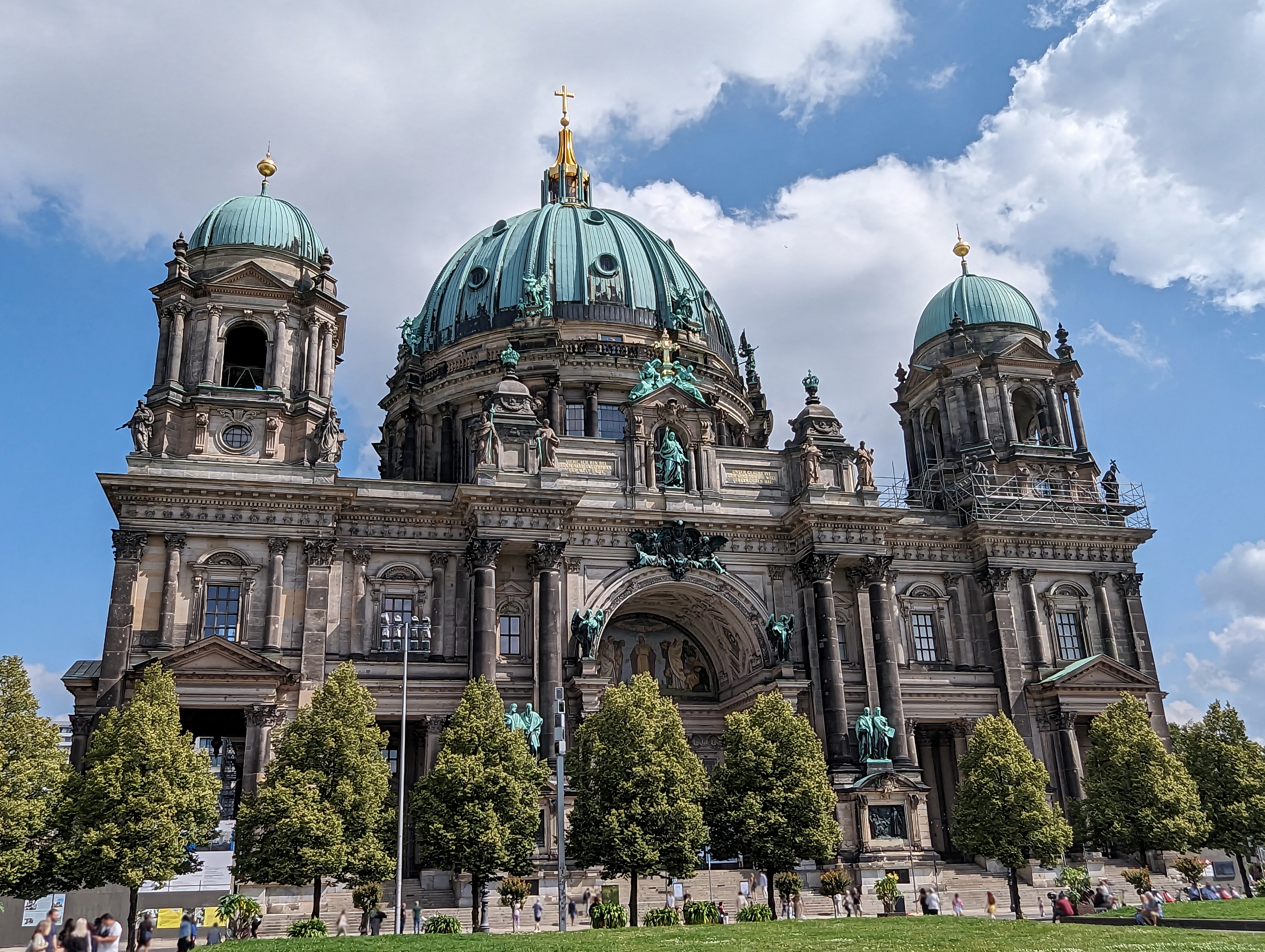
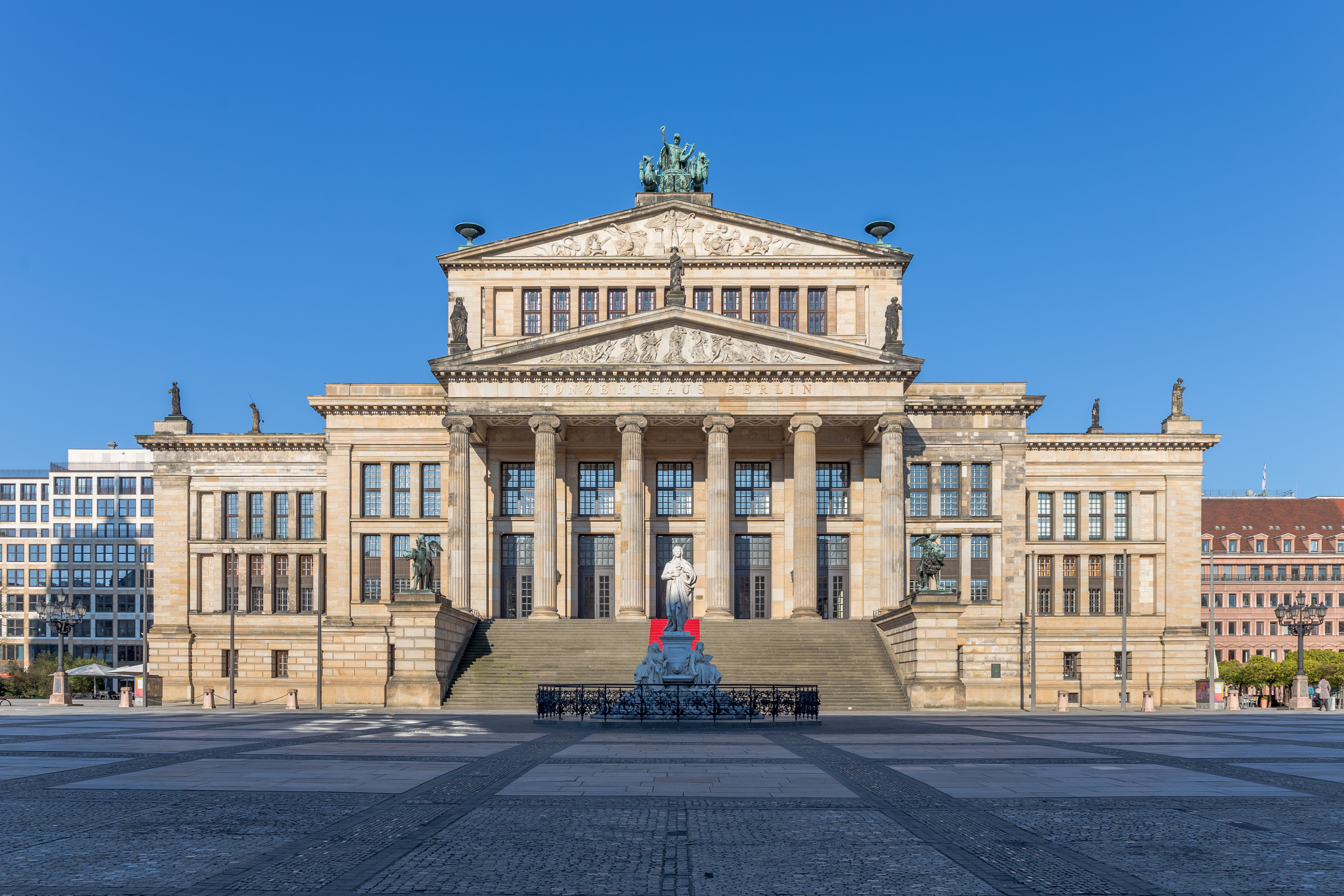
- Spree river, Museum Island, Berlin TV Tower and Berlin Palace in Mitte Charlottenburg Palace Victory Column Berlin Palace Brandenburg Gate Berlin Cathedral Reichstag Gendarmenmarkt

- Flag Coat of arms
- Interactive map of Berlin
- Location within Germany Location within Europe
- Coordinates: 52°31′12″N 13°24′18″E
- Country: Germany
- State: Berlin

Government
  - Body: Berlin House of Representatives
  - Governing Mayor: Kai Wegner (CDU)
  - Bundesrat votes: 4 (of 69)
  - Bundestag seats: 24 (of 630) (as of 2025)

Area
  - City/State: 891.3 km^{2} (344.1 sq mi)
  - Urban: 3,743 km^{2} (1,445 sq mi)
- Elevation: 34 m (112 ft)

Population (2022 census)
  - City/State: 3,596,999
  - Estimate (December 2025): 3,700,577
  - Rank: 5th in Europe; 1st in Germany
  - Density: 4,109/km^{2} (10,640/sq mi)
  - Urban: 4,679,500
  - Urban density: 1,250/km^{2} (3,200/sq mi)
- Demonyms: Berliner(s) (English); Berliner (m), Berlinerin (f) (German)

GDP (nominal, 2025)
  - City/State: €218.29 billion (US$246.37 billion)
  - Metro: €322.39 billion (US$363.87 billion)
- Time zone: UTC+01:00 (CET)
  - Summer (DST): UTC+02:00 (CEST)
- Area code: 030
- Geocode: NUTS Region: DE3
- ISO 3166 code: DE-BE
- Vehicle registration: B
- GeoTLD: .berlin
- HDI (2022): 0.967 very high · 2nd of 16
- Website: berlin.de

Berlin (Note: English: /bɜːrˈlɪn/ bur-LIN; German: [bɛʁˈliːn].) is the capital and largest city of Germany. With 3.7 million inhabitants, it has the highest population within its city limits of any city in the European Union (EU). The metropolis is also one of the states of Germany, being the third-smallest state in the country by area. Berlin is surrounded by the state of Brandenburg, bordering Brandenburg's capital Potsdam to the southwest. The urban area of Berlin has a population of 4.5 million, making it the second most populous in Germany after the Ruhr. The Berlin-Brandenburg capital region has around 6.2 million inhabitants and is Germany's second-largest metropolitan region after the Rhine-Ruhr region, as well as the fifth-biggest metropolitan region by GDP in the EU. Berlin is a global city of culture, politics, media and science.

Berlin was built along the banks of the Spree river, which flows into the Havel in the western borough of Spandau. First documented in the 13th century and at the crossing of two important historic trade routes, Berlin was designated the capital of the Margraviate of Brandenburg (1417–1701), Kingdom of Prussia (1701–1918), German Empire (1871–1918), Weimar Republic (1919–1933), and Nazi Germany (1933–1945). Berlin served as a scientific, artistic, and philosophical hub during the Age of Enlightenment, Neoclassicism, and the German revolutions of 1848–1849. During the Gründerzeit, an industrialization-induced economic boom triggered a rapid population increase in Berlin. Berlin in the 1920s was the third-largest city in the world by population.

After World War II and following Berlin's occupation, the city was split into West Berlin and East Berlin, divided by the Berlin Wall. East Berlin was declared the capital of East Germany, while Bonn became the West German capital. Following German reunification in 1990, Berlin once again became the capital of all of Germany. Due to its geographic location and history, Berlin has been called "the heart of Europe". Its economy is based on high tech and the service sector, encompassing a diverse range of creative industries, startup companies, research facilities, and media corporations. Berlin serves as a continental hub for air and rail traffic and has a complex public transportation network. Tourism in Berlin makes the city a popular global destination.

Berlin is home to several universities, such as the Humboldt University of Berlin, Technische Universität Berlin, the Berlin University of the Arts and the Free University of Berlin. The Berlin Zoological Garden is the most visited zoo in Europe. Babelsberg Studio is the world's first large-scale movie studio complex, and there are many films set in Berlin. Berlin is home to three UNESCO World Heritage Sites: Museum Island, the Palaces and Parks of Potsdam and Berlin, and the Berlin Modernism Housing Estates. Other landmarks include the Brandenburg Gate, the Reichstag building, Potsdamer Platz, the Memorial to the Murdered Jews of Europe, and the Berlin Wall Memorial. Berlin has numerous museums, galleries, and libraries. The city includes lakes in the western and southeastern boroughs, the largest of which is Müggelsee. About 1/3 of the city's area is composed of forests, parks and gardens, rivers, canals, and lakes.

== History ==
=== Etymology ===
Berlin lies in northeastern Germany, in an area formerly settled by Slavs which thus exhibits many (Germanized) Slavic-derived placenames to this day (see below). The word Berlin also has its roots in the language of the West Slavs, and may be related to the Old Polabian stem berl-/birl- ("swamp").

Of Berlin's twelve boroughs, five bear a Slavic-derived name—Pankow, Steglitz-Zehlendorf, Marzahn-Hellersdorf, Treptow-Köpenick and Spandau; furthermore, across the city's 96 neighborhoods, there are 22 which bear a Slavic-rooted name—Altglienicke, Alt-Treptow, Britz, Buch, Buckow, Gatow, Karow, Kladow, Köpenick, Lankwitz, Lübars, Malchow, Marzahn, Pankow, Prenzlauer Berg, Rudow, Schmöckwitz, Spandau, Stadtrandsiedlung Malchow, Steglitz, Tegel and Zehlendorf.

=== Prehistory ===
The area of what is now Berlin has been settled for millennia. A deer mask, dated to 9,000 BCE, is attributed to the Maglemosian culture. Around 2,000 BCE dense human settlements along the Spree and Havel rivers gave rise to the Lusatian culture. Starting around 500 BCE Germanic tribes settled in a number of villages in the higher situated areas of today's Berlin. After the Semnones left around 200 CE, the Burgundians followed. In the 7th century Slavic tribes, the later known Hevelli and Sprevane, reached the region.

=== 12th century to 16th century ===
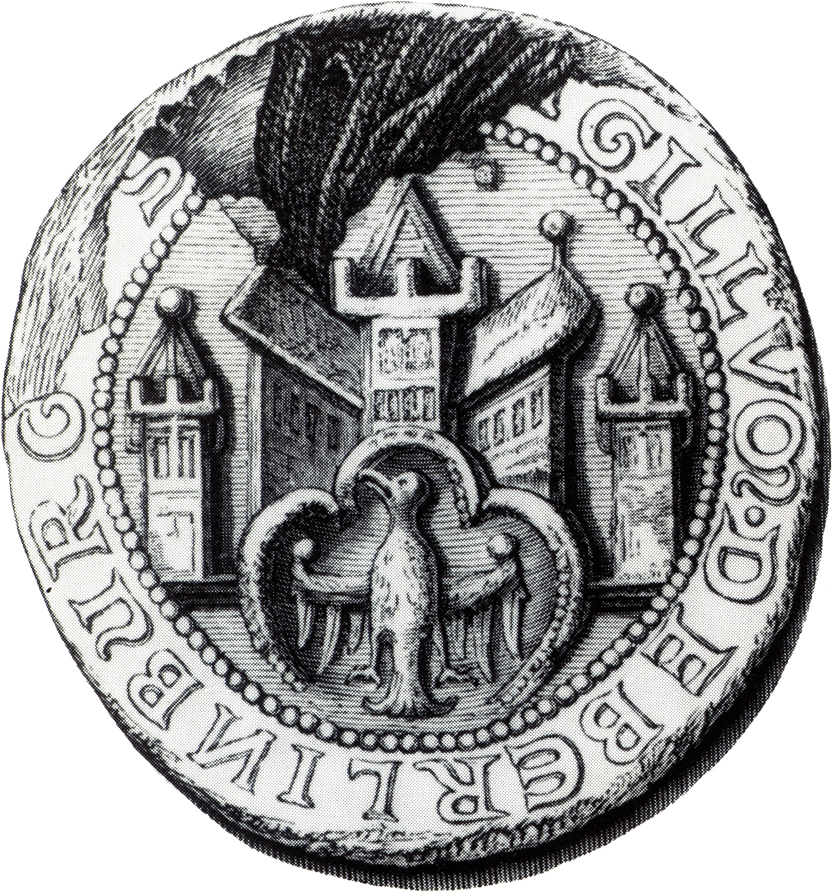
The oldest seal of Berlin, dating back to 1253

In the 12th century the region came under German rule as part of the Margraviate of Brandenburg, founded by Albert the Bear in 1157. The first written records of towns in the area of present-day Berlin date from the late 12th century. Spandau is first mentioned in 1197 and Köpenick in 1209. German merchants founded two settlements in today's city center – Berlin (or Alt-Berlin; at the site of today's Nikolaiviertel) and Cölln (on the island in the Spree now known as Museum Island). 1237 is considered the founding date of the city. Berlin and Cölln over time formed close economic and social ties, and profited from the staple right on the two important trade routes. One was known as Via Imperii, and the other trade route reached from Bruges to Novgorod. In 1307, the two towns formed an alliance with a common external policy, their internal administrations still being separated. In 1326, the territory of Berlin was raided by pagan Lithuanians during the Raid on Brandenburg.

Members of the Hohenzollern family ruled in Berlin until 1918, first as electors of Brandenburg, then as kings of Prussia, and eventually as German emperors. In 1443, Frederick II of Brandenburg initiated the construction of a new royal palace in the twin city of Berlin-Cölln. The protests of the town citizens against the building culminated in 1448, in the "Berlin Indignation" (German: Berliner Unwille). Officially, the Berlin-Cölln palace became the permanent residence of the Brandenburg electors of the Hohenzollern dynasty in 1486, when John Cicero took power. Berlin-Cölln, however, had to give up its status as a free Hanseatic League city. In 1539, the electors and the city officially became Lutheran.

=== 17th to 19th centuries ===
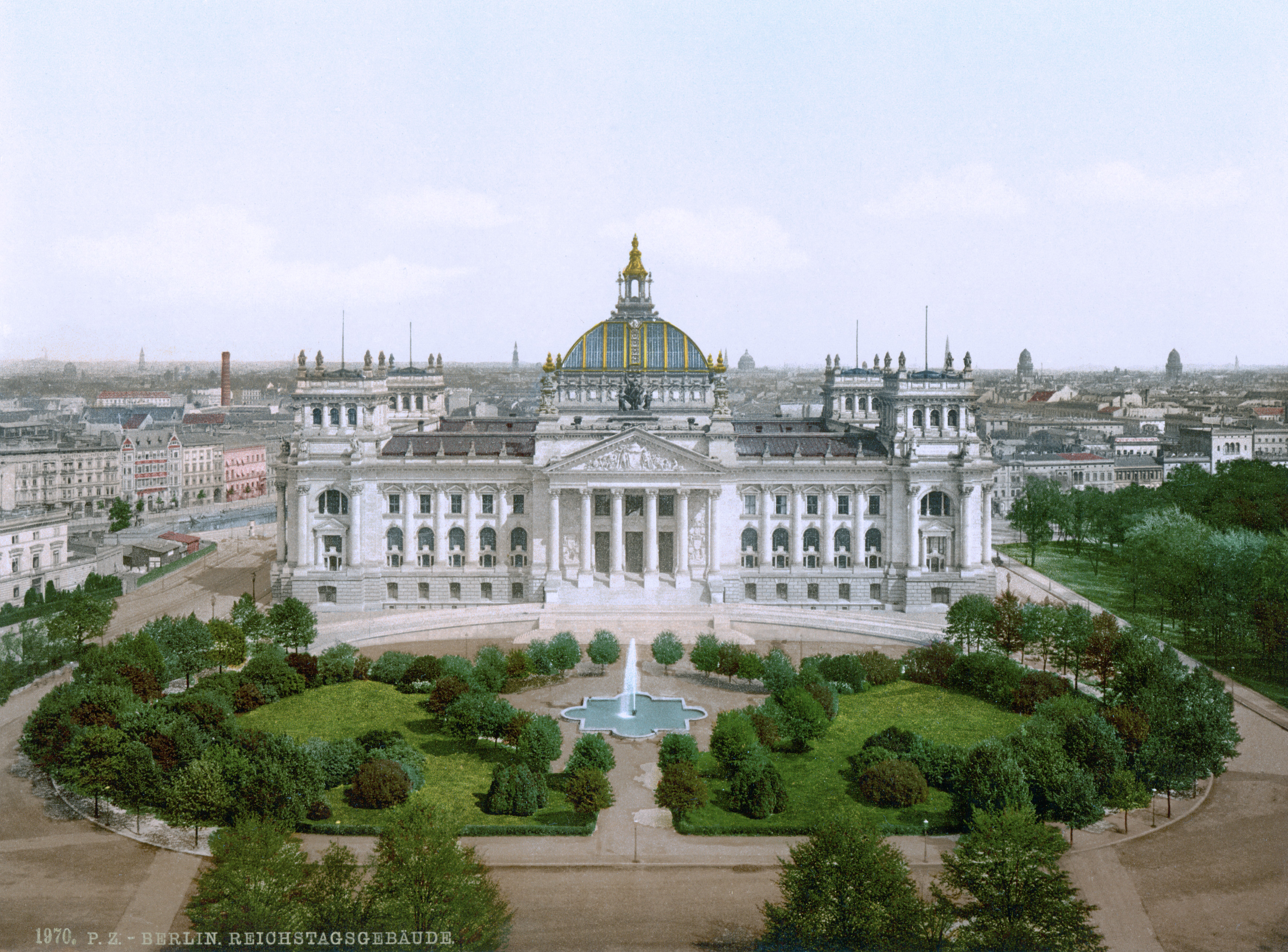
Reichstag building at the end of the 19th century

The Thirty Years' War between 1618 and 1648 devastated Berlin. One third of its houses were damaged or destroyed, and the city lost half of its population. Frederick William, known as the "Great Elector", who had succeeded his father George William as ruler in 1640, initiated a policy of promoting immigration and religious tolerance. With the Edict of Potsdam in 1685, Frederick William offered asylum to the French Huguenots.

By 1700, approximately 30 percent of Berlin's residents were French, because of the Huguenot immigration. Many other immigrants came from Bohemia, Poland, and Salzburg.

Since 1618, the Margraviate of Brandenburg had been in personal union with the Duchy of Prussia. In 1701, the dual state formed the Kingdom of Prussia, as Frederick III, Elector of Brandenburg, crowned himself as king Frederick I in Prussia. Berlin became the capital of the new Kingdom, replacing Königsberg. This was a successful attempt to centralise the capital in the very far-flung state, and it was the first time the city began to grow. In 1709, Berlin merged with the four cities of Cölln, Friedrichswerder, Friedrichstadt and Dorotheenstadt under the name Berlin, "Haupt- und Residenzstadt Berlin". Between 1700 and 1750, Berlin's population nearly quadrupled, rising from about 30,000 to 113,000.

In 1740, Frederick the Great came to power. Under his rule, Berlin became a center of the Enlightenment, but was also briefly occupied by the Russian army during the Seven Years' War. Following France's victory in the War of the Fourth Coalition, Napoleon Bonaparte marched into Berlin in 1806, but granted self-government to the city. In 1815, the city became part of the new Province of Brandenburg.

The Industrial Revolution transformed Berlin during the 19th century; the city's economy and population expanded dramatically, and it became the main railway hub and economic center of Germany. Additional suburbs soon developed and increased the area and population of Berlin. In 1861, neighboring suburbs including Wedding, Moabit and several others were incorporated into Berlin. In 1871, Berlin became capital of the newly founded German Empire. In 1881, it became a city district separate from Brandenburg.

=== 1900–1945 ===
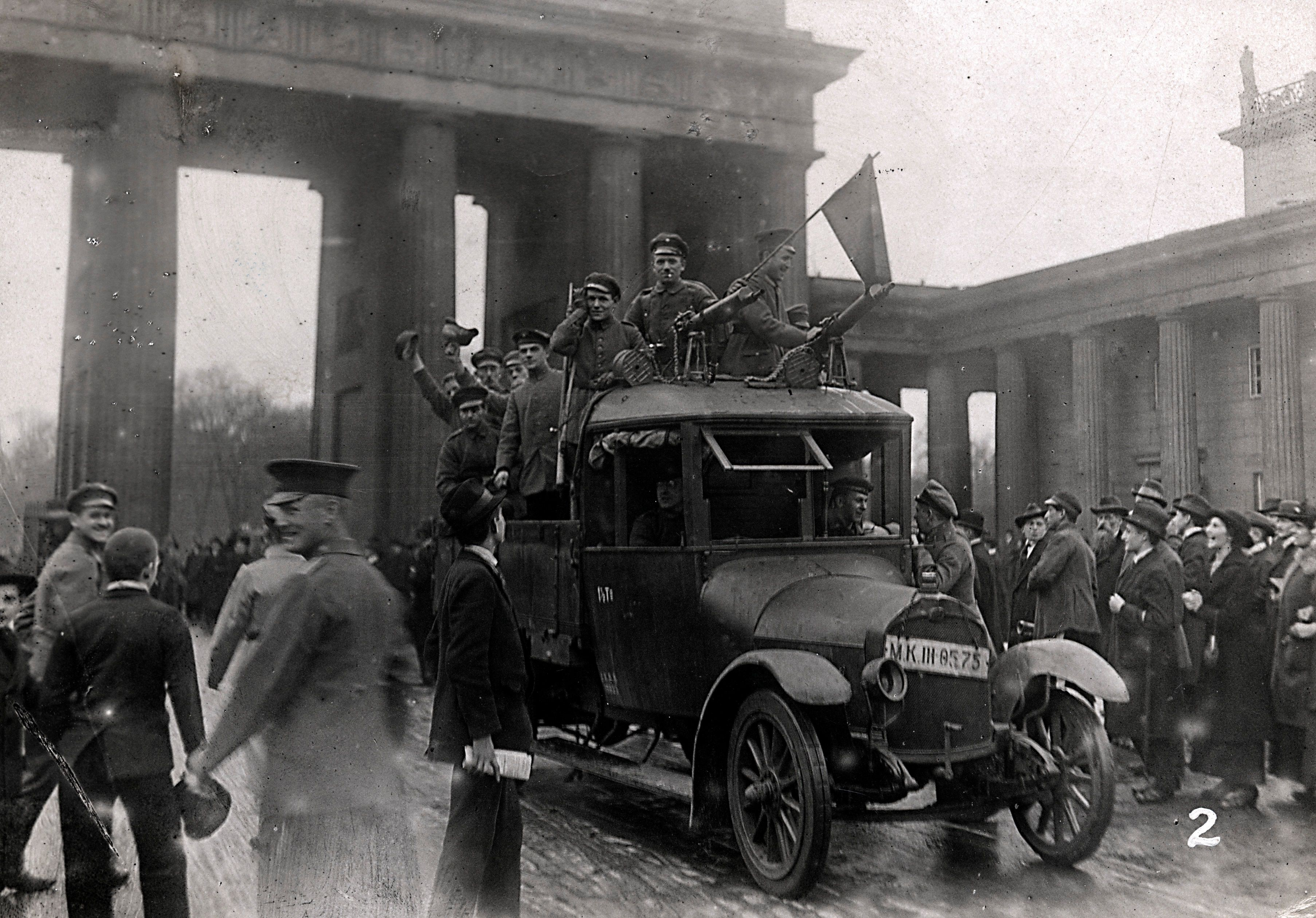
German Revolution in Berlin in 1918

In the early 20th century, Berlin had become a fertile ground for the German Expressionist movement. In fields such as architecture, painting and cinema new forms of artistic styles were invented.

At the end of World War I, during the German Revolution, the Weimar Republic was proclaimed by Philipp Scheidemann at the Reichstag building on November 9, 1918. In 1920, the Greater Berlin Act incorporated dozens of suburban cities, villages, and estates around Berlin into an expanded city. The act increased the area of Berlin from 66 to 883 km^{2} (25 to 341 sq mi). The population almost doubled, and Berlin had a population of around four million. During the Weimar era, Berlin underwent political unrest due to economic uncertainties but also became a renowned center of the Roaring Twenties. The metropolis experienced its heyday as a major world capital and was known for its leadership roles in science, technology, arts, the humanities, city planning, film, higher education, government, and industries. Albert Einstein rose to public prominence during his years in Berlin, being awarded the Nobel Prize for Physics in 1921.

In 1933, Adolf Hitler and the Nazi Party came to power. Hitler wished for a German Reich with a capital city that had a monumental ensemble. The National Socialist regime embarked on monumental construction projects in Berlin as a way to express their power and authority through architecture. Adolf Hitler and Albert Speer developed architectural concepts for the conversion of the city into World Capital Germania; these were never implemented. Berlin hosted the 1936 Summer Olympics for which the Olympic stadium was built.

NSDAP rule diminished Berlin's Jewish community from 160,000 (one-third of all Jews in the country) to about 80,000 due to emigration between 1933 and 1939. After Kristallnacht in 1938, thousands of the city's Jews were imprisoned in the nearby Sachsenhausen concentration camp. Starting in early 1943, many were deported to ghettos like Łódź, and to concentration and extermination camps such as Auschwitz. During World War II, Berlin was the location of multiple Nazi prisons, forced labor camps, 17 subcamps of the Sachsenhausen concentration camp for men and women, including teenagers, of various nationalities, a camp for Sinti and Romani people (see Romani Holocaust), and the Stalag III-D prisoner-of-war camp for Allied POWs of various nationalities.

Parts of Berlin – including large parts of the city center – were destroyed in the bombing of Berlin by Allied air raids in 1943–45 and the 1945 Battle of Berlin. The Allies dropped 67,607 tons of bombs on the city, destroying 6,427 acres (26 km^{2}) of the built-up area. Around 125,000 civilians were killed. After the end of World War II in Europe in May 1945, Berlin received large numbers of refugees from the former eastern territories of Germany. The victorious powers divided the city into four sectors, in a similar way to Allied-occupied Germany. The sectors of the western allies (the United States, the United Kingdom, and France) formed West Berlin, while the Soviet sector formed East Berlin.

=== 1946–Present ===
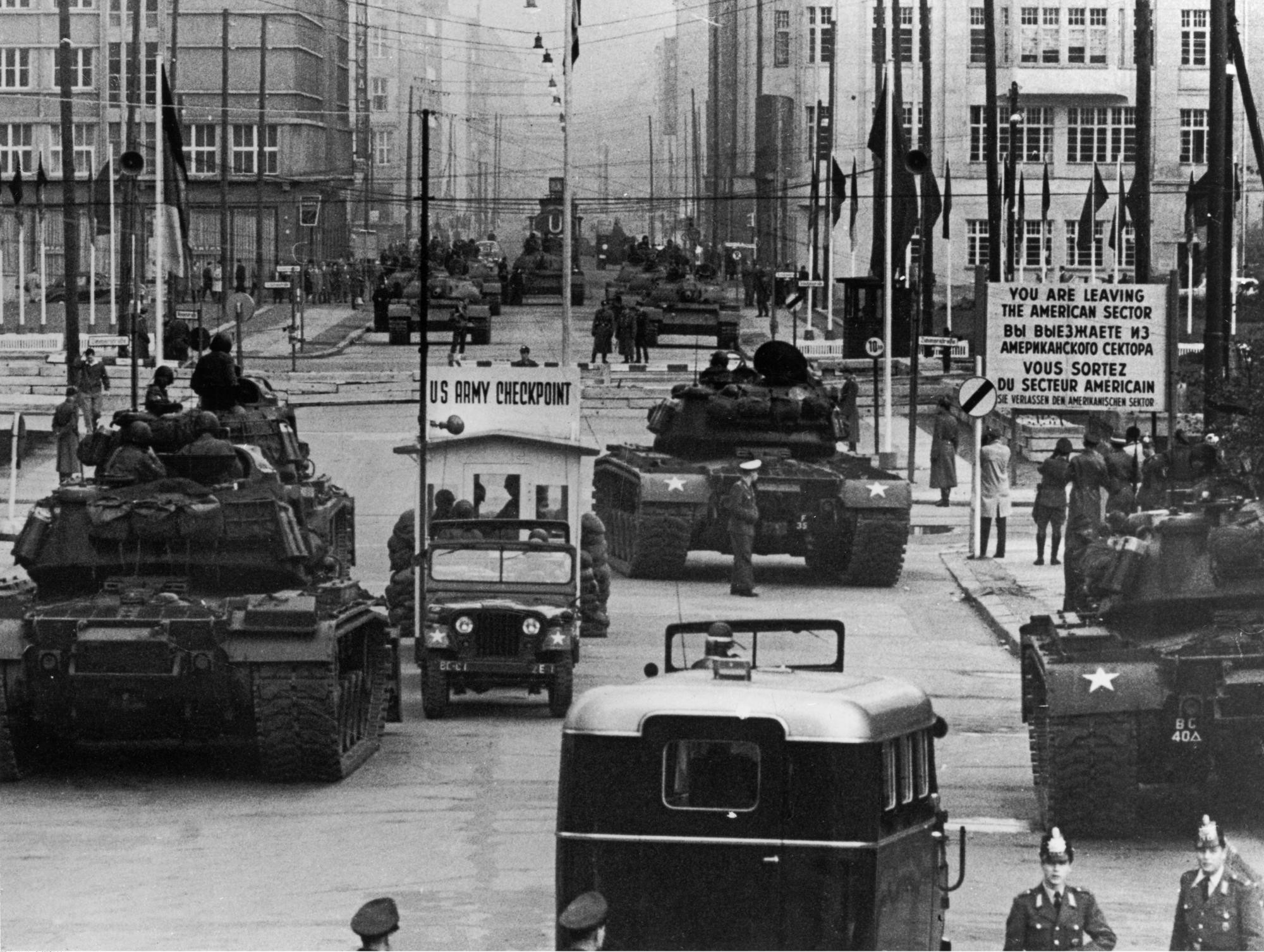
US and Soviet tanks face each other, taken in 1961 at Checkpoint Charlie.

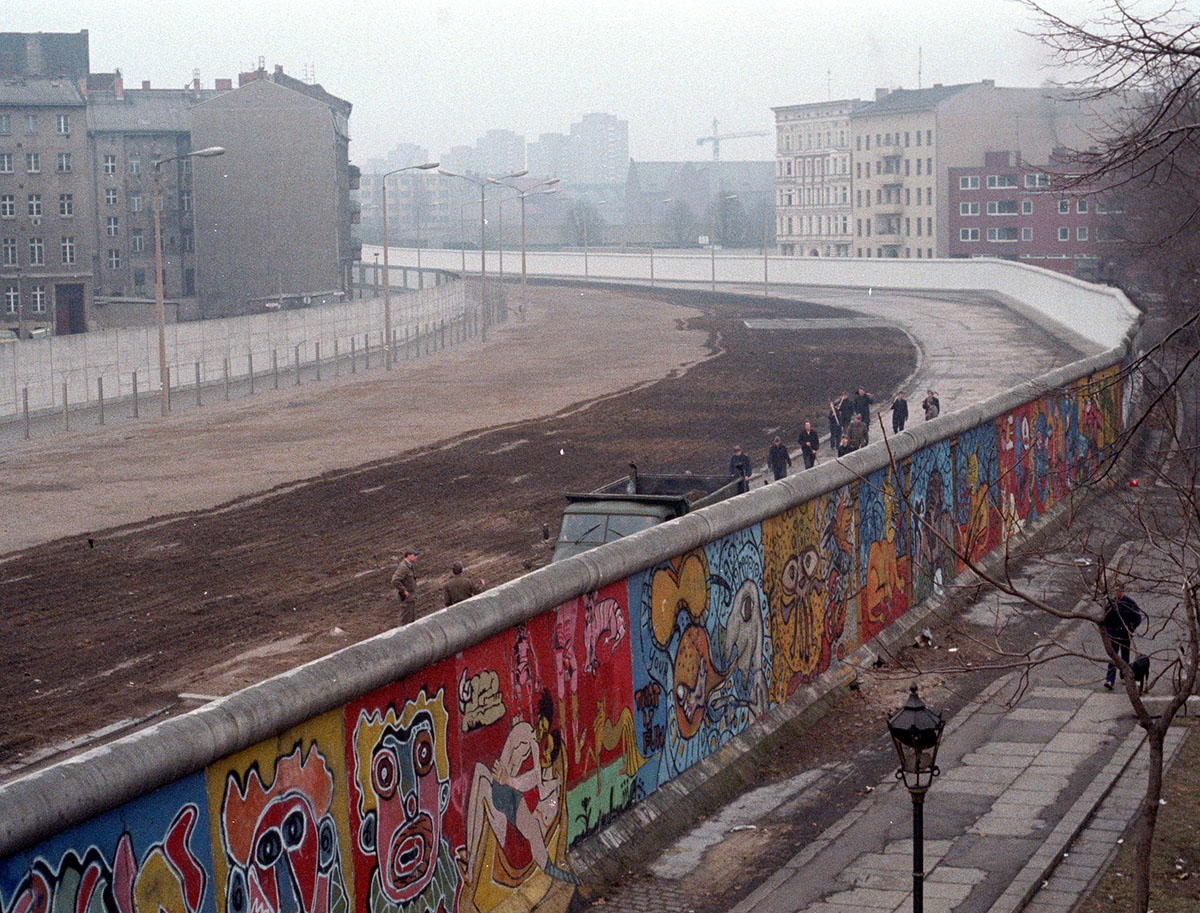
The Berlin Wall (painted on the western side) was a barrier that divided the city from 1961 to 1989.

All four Allies of World War II shared administrative responsibilities for Berlin. However, in 1948, when the Western Allies extended the currency reform in the Trizone to the three western sectors of Berlin, the Soviet Union imposed the Berlin Blockade on the access routes to and from West Berlin, which lay entirely inside Soviet-controlled territory. The Berlin airlift, conducted by the three western Allies, overcame this blockade by supplying food and other supplies to the city from June 1948 to May 1949.

The founding of East and West Germany in 1949 increased Cold War tensions. West Berlin was surrounded by East German territory, and East Germany proclaimed the eastern part as its capital, a move the western powers did not recognize. East Berlin included most of the city's historic center. The West German government established itself in Bonn. In 1961, East Germany began to build the Berlin Wall around West Berlin, and events escalated to a tank standoff at Checkpoint Charlie. West Berlin was now de facto a part of West Germany with a unique legal status, while East Berlin was de facto a part of East Germany. John F. Kennedy gave his "Ich bin ein Berliner" speech on 26 June 1963, underlining the US support for West Berlin. Although it was possible for Westerners to pass to the other side through strictly controlled checkpoints, for most Easterners travel to West Berlin or West Germany was prohibited by the East German government. In 1971, a Four-Power Agreement guaranteed access to and from West Berlin by car or train through East Germany.

In 1989, with the end of the Cold War and pressure from the East German population, the Berlin Wall fell on 9 November and was subsequently mostly demolished. On 3 October 1990, the two parts of Germany were reunified as the Federal Republic of Germany, and Berlin again became a united city. After the fall of the Berlin Wall, the city experienced significant urban development.

Walter Momper, the mayor of West Berlin, became the first mayor of the reunified city in the interim. City-wide elections in December 1990 resulted in the first "all Berlin" mayor being elected to take office in January 1991, with the separate offices of mayors in East and West Berlin expiring by that time, and Eberhard Diepgen (a former mayor of West Berlin) became the first elected mayor of a reunited Berlin.

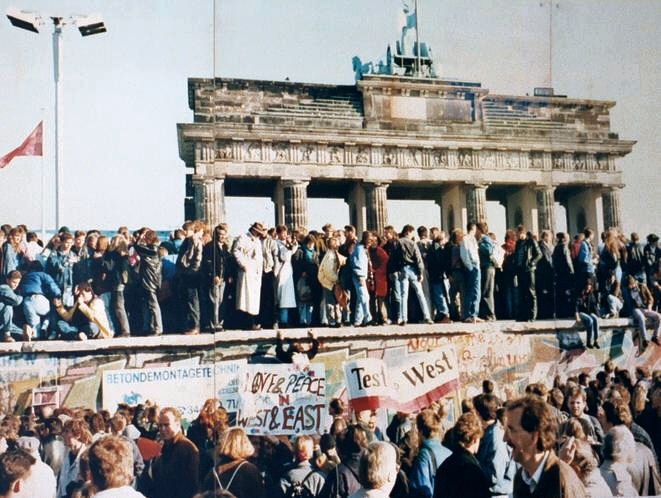
The fall of the Berlin Wall marked the end of the Cold War.

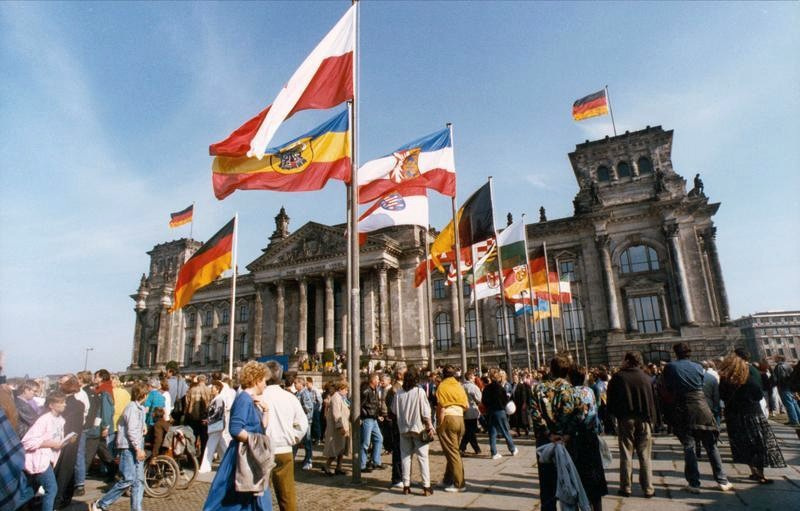
German reunification on 3 October 1990, with flags of all German states at the Reichstag

On 18 June 1994, soldiers from the United States, France and Britain marched in a parade which was part of the ceremonies to mark the withdrawal of Allied occupation troops, allowing a reunified Berlin. On 20 June 1991, the Bundestag (lower house of the German Parliament) voted to move the seat of the German capital from Bonn to Berlin, and this was completed in 1999. Berlin's 2001 administrative reform merged several boroughs, reducing their number from 23 to 12.

Potsdamer Platz, which had been a central traffic and commerce hub in the 1920s, but had been heavily impacted by the wall during partition, became one of Europe's biggest building sites and is now once again one of Berlin's most representative addresses. Several redevelopment projects have taken place, such as the demolition of the Palast der Republik – the former seat of East Germany's parliament – to make way for the Humboldt Forum, a reconstruction of the Berlin Palace on the same site. The traffic infrastructure of Berlin was another post-unification priority, leading to the closure of Tempelhof Airport in 2008, the opening of a new Berlin Hauptbahnhof in 2006, and finally the long-delayed opening of Berlin Brandenburg Airport in 2020 accompanied by the shutdown of Tegel Airport.

In 2006, the FIFA World Cup Final was held in Berlin.

== Geography ==
=== Topography ===
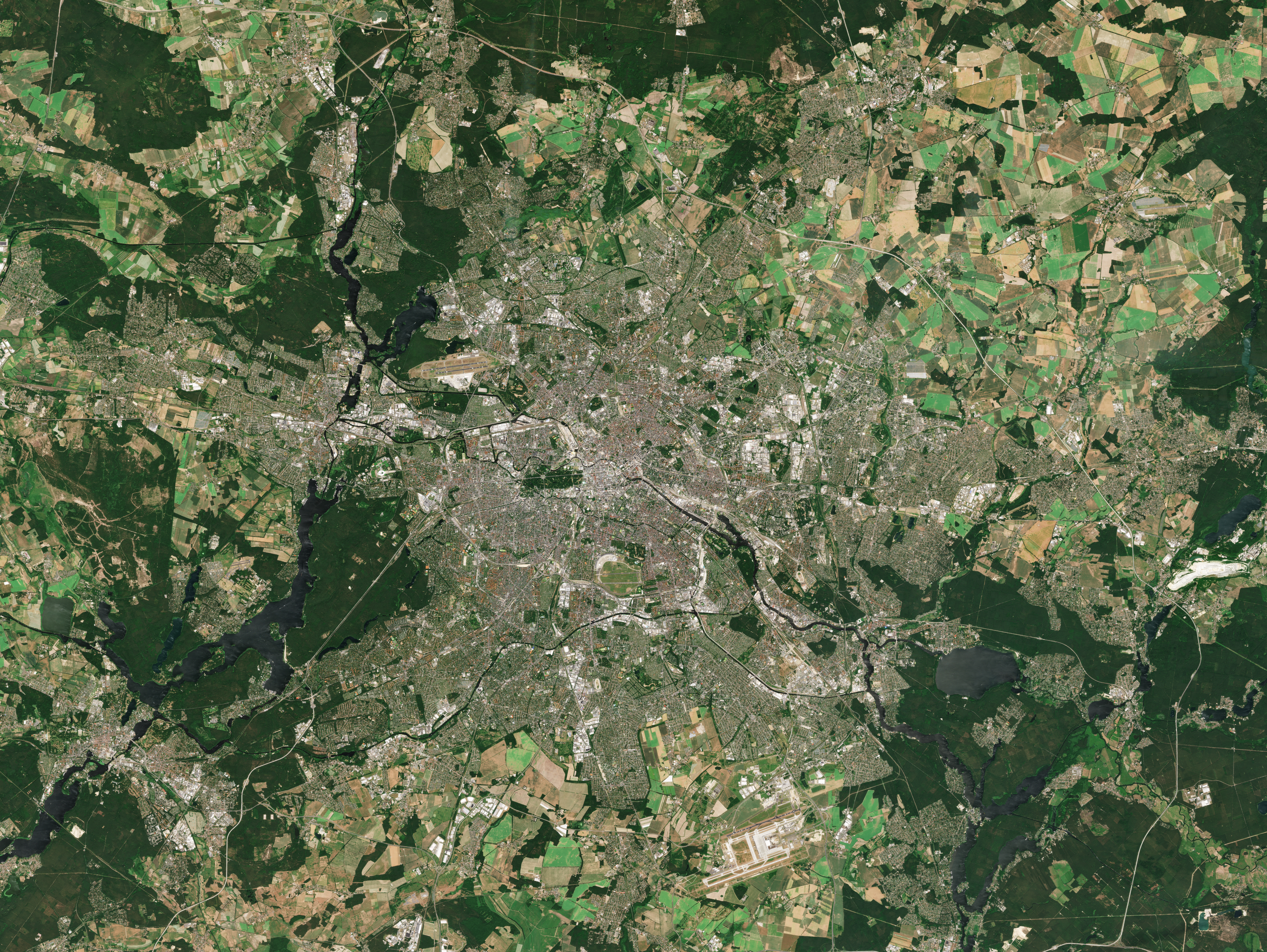
Satellite image of Berlin

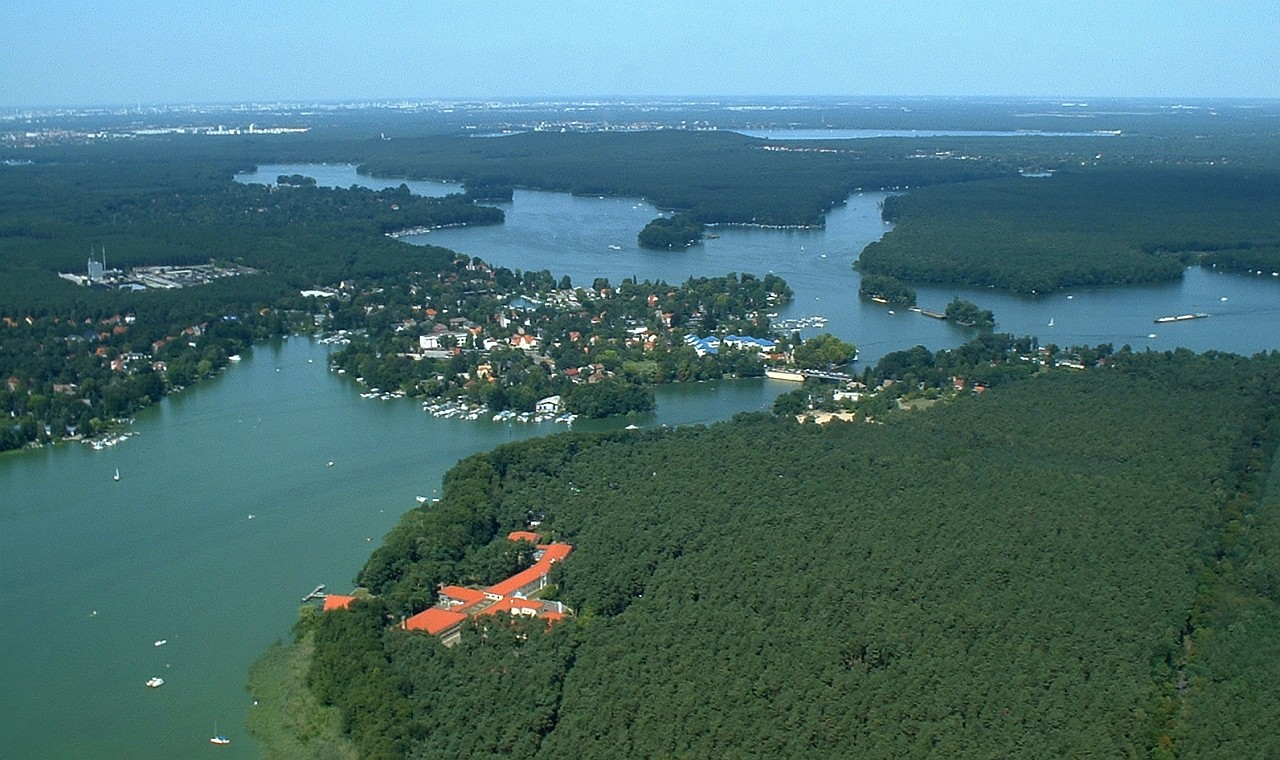
The outskirts of Berlin are covered with woodlands and numerous lakes.

Berlin is in northeastern Germany, in an area of low-lying marshy woodlands with a mainly flat topography, part of the vast Northern European Plain which stretches all the way from northern France to western Russia. The Berliner Urstromtal (an ice age glacial valley), between the low Barnim Plateau to the north and the Teltow plateau to the south, was formed by meltwater flowing from ice sheets at the end of the last Weichselian glaciation. The Spree follows this valley now. In Spandau, a borough in the west of Berlin, the Spree empties into the river Havel, which flows from north to south through western Berlin. The course of the Havel is more like a chain of lakes, the largest being the Tegeler See and the Großer Wannsee. A series of lakes also feeds into the upper Spree, which flows through the Großer Müggelsee in eastern Berlin.

Substantial parts of present-day Berlin extend onto the low plateaus on both sides of the Spree Valley. Large parts of the boroughs Reinickendorf and Pankow lie on the Barnim Plateau, while most of the boroughs of Charlottenburg-Wilmersdorf, Steglitz-Zehlendorf, Tempelhof-Schöneberg, and Neukölln lie on the Teltow Plateau.

The borough of Spandau lies partly within the Berlin Glacial Valley and partly on the Nauen Plain, which stretches to the west of Berlin. Since 2015, the Arkenberge hills in Pankow at 122 meters (400 ft) elevation, have been the highest point in Berlin. Through the disposal of construction debris they surpassed Teufelsberg (120.1 m or 394 ft), which itself was made up of rubble from the ruins of the Second World War. The Müggelberge at 114.7 meters (376 ft) elevation is the highest natural point and the lowest is the Spektesee in Spandau, at 28.1 meters (92 ft) elevation.

=== Climate ===
Berlin has an oceanic climate (Köppen: Cfb) bordering on a humid continental climate (Dfb). This type of climate features mild to very warm summer temperatures and cold, though not very severe, winters. Annual precipitation is modest.

Frosts are common in winter, and there are larger temperature differences between seasons than typical for many oceanic climates. Summers are warm and sometimes humid with average high temperatures of 22–25 °C (72–77 °F) and lows of 12–14 °C (54–57 °F). Winters are cold with average high temperatures of 3 °C (37 °F) and lows of −2 to 0 °C (28 to 32 °F). Spring and autumn are generally chilly to mild. Berlin's built-up area creates a microclimate, with heat stored by the city's buildings and pavement. Temperatures can be 4 °C (7 °F) higher in the city than in the surrounding areas. Annual precipitation is 570 millimeters (22 in) with moderate rainfall throughout the year. Snowfall mainly occurs from December through March. The hottest month in Berlin was July 1757, with a mean temperature of 24 °C (75 °F), and the coldest was January 1709, with a mean temperature of −13 °C (9 °F). The wettest month on record was July 1907, with 230 millimeters (9.1 in) of rainfall, whereas the driest were October 1866, November 1902, October 1908 and September 1928, all with 1 millimeter (0.039 in) of rainfall.

Climate data for Berlin (Brandenburg), 1991–2020, extremes 1957–present
| Month | Jan | Feb | Mar | Apr | May | Jun | Jul | Aug | Sep | Oct | Nov | Dec | Year |
|---|---|---|---|---|---|---|---|---|---|---|---|---|---|
| Record high °C (°F) | 15.1 (59.2) | 19.2 (66.6) | 25.8 (78.4) | 30.8 (87.4) | 32.7 (90.9) | 39.9 (103.8) | 38.3 (100.9) | 38.0 (100.4) | 34.1 (93.4) | 27.7 (81.9) | 20.9 (69.6) | 15.6 (60.1) | 39.9 (103.8) |
| Mean maximum °C (°F) | 10.6 (51.1) | 12.4 (54.3) | 17.9 (64.2) | 24.0 (75.2) | 28.4 (83.1) | 31.5 (88.7) | 32.7 (90.9) | 32.7 (90.9) | 26.9 (80.4) | 21.5 (70.7) | 14.8 (58.6) | 11.2 (52.2) | 34.8 (94.6) |
| Mean daily maximum °C (°F) | 3.2 (37.8) | 4.9 (40.8) | 9.0 (48.2) | 15.1 (59.2) | 19.6 (67.3) | 22.9 (73.2) | 25.0 (77.0) | 24.8 (76.6) | 19.8 (67.6) | 13.9 (57.0) | 7.7 (45.9) | 4.1 (39.4) | 14.2 (57.5) |
| Daily mean °C (°F) | 0.7 (33.3) | 1.6 (34.9) | 4.6 (40.3) | 9.7 (49.5) | 14.2 (57.6) | 17.6 (63.7) | 19.6 (67.3) | 19.2 (66.6) | 14.7 (58.5) | 9.6 (49.3) | 4.9 (40.8) | 1.8 (35.2) | 9.9 (49.8) |
| Mean daily minimum °C (°F) | −2.2 (28.0) | −1.8 (28.8) | 0.4 (32.7) | 4.0 (39.2) | 8.2 (46.8) | 11.7 (53.1) | 14.0 (57.2) | 13.5 (56.3) | 9.8 (49.6) | 5.6 (42.1) | 1.9 (35.4) | −0.9 (30.4) | 5.3 (41.6) |
| Mean minimum °C (°F) | −12.0 (10.4) | −9.5 (14.9) | −5.8 (21.6) | −2.6 (27.3) | 1.7 (35.1) | 6.3 (43.3) | 8.9 (48.0) | 8.1 (46.6) | 3.9 (39.0) | −1.3 (29.7) | −5.0 (23.0) | −8.9 (16.0) | −14.2 (6.4) |
| Record low °C (°F) | −25.3 (−13.5) | −22.0 (−7.6) | −19.1 (−2.4) | −7.4 (18.7) | −2.8 (27.0) | 1.3 (34.3) | 4.9 (40.8) | 4.6 (40.3) | −0.9 (30.4) | −7.7 (18.1) | −17.8 (0.0) | −24.0 (−11.2) | −25.3 (−13.5) |
| Average precipitation mm (inches) | 41.5 (1.63) | 30.0 (1.18) | 35.9 (1.41) | 27.7 (1.09) | 52.8 (2.08) | 60.2 (2.37) | 70.0 (2.76) | 52.4 (2.06) | 43.6 (1.72) | 40.3 (1.59) | 38.8 (1.53) | 39.1 (1.54) | 532.3 (20.96) |
| Average precipitation days (≥ 0.1 mm) | 15.8 | 13.9 | 14.0 | 10.9 | 12.8 | 12.4 | 13.4 | 12.7 | 11.6 | 13.6 | 14.5 | 16.4 | 162 |
| Average snowy days (≥ 1 cm) | 8.4 | 6.8 | 2.6 | 0.2 | 0.0 | 0.0 | 0.0 | 0.0 | 0.0 | 0.0 | 1.4 | 4.9 | 24.3 |
| Average relative humidity (%) | 85.9 | 81.2 | 75.8 | 67.2 | 66.9 | 66.3 | 67.0 | 68.5 | 76.0 | 82.7 | 87.8 | 87.5 | 76.1 |
| Mean monthly sunshine hours | 52.6 | 77.9 | 126.7 | 196.4 | 231.1 | 232.9 | 233.7 | 222.2 | 168.9 | 113.8 | 57.4 | 45.0 | 1,758.6 |
Source 1: Data derived from Deutscher Wetterdienst
Source 2: NCEI(days with precipitation and snow, humidity)

Climate data for Berlin (Dahlem), 58 m or 190 ft, 1961–1990 normals, extremes 1908–present
| Month | Jan | Feb | Mar | Apr | May | Jun | Jul | Aug | Sep | Oct | Nov | Dec | Year |
|---|---|---|---|---|---|---|---|---|---|---|---|---|---|
| Record high °C (°F) | 15.2 (59.4) | 18.6 (65.5) | 25.1 (77.2) | 30.9 (87.6) | 33.3 (91.9) | 39.5 (103.1) | 37.9 (100.2) | 37.7 (99.9) | 34.2 (93.6) | 27.5 (81.5) | 19.5 (67.1) | 15.7 (60.3) | 39.5 (103.1) |
| Mean daily maximum °C (°F) | 1.8 (35.2) | 3.5 (38.3) | 7.9 (46.2) | 13.1 (55.6) | 18.6 (65.5) | 21.8 (71.2) | 23.1 (73.6) | 22.8 (73.0) | 18.7 (65.7) | 13.3 (55.9) | 7.0 (44.6) | 3.2 (37.8) | 12.9 (55.2) |
| Daily mean °C (°F) | −0.4 (31.3) | 0.6 (33.1) | 4.0 (39.2) | 8.4 (47.1) | 13.5 (56.3) | 16.7 (62.1) | 17.9 (64.2) | 17.2 (63.0) | 13.5 (56.3) | 9.3 (48.7) | 4.6 (40.3) | 1.2 (34.2) | 8.9 (48.0) |
| Mean daily minimum °C (°F) | −2.9 (26.8) | −2.2 (28.0) | 0.5 (32.9) | 3.9 (39.0) | 8.2 (46.8) | 11.4 (52.5) | 12.9 (55.2) | 12.4 (54.3) | 9.4 (48.9) | 5.9 (42.6) | 2.1 (35.8) | −1.1 (30.0) | 5.0 (41.1) |
| Record low °C (°F) | −21.0 (−5.8) | −26.0 (−14.8) | −16.5 (2.3) | −6.7 (19.9) | −2.9 (26.8) | 0.8 (33.4) | 5.4 (41.7) | 4.7 (40.5) | −0.5 (31.1) | −9.6 (14.7) | −16.1 (3.0) | −20.2 (−4.4) | −26.0 (−14.8) |
| Average precipitation mm (inches) | 43.0 (1.69) | 37.0 (1.46) | 38.0 (1.50) | 42.0 (1.65) | 55.0 (2.17) | 71.0 (2.80) | 53.0 (2.09) | 65.0 (2.56) | 46.0 (1.81) | 36.0 (1.42) | 50.0 (1.97) | 55.0 (2.17) | 591 (23.29) |
| Average precipitation days (≥ 1.0 mm) | 10.0 | 9.0 | 8.0 | 9.0 | 10.0 | 10.0 | 9.0 | 9.0 | 9.0 | 8.0 | 10.0 | 11.0 | 112 |
| Mean monthly sunshine hours | 45.4 | 72.3 | 122.0 | 157.7 | 221.6 | 220.9 | 217.9 | 210.2 | 156.3 | 110.9 | 52.4 | 37.4 | 1,625 |
Source 1: NOAA
Source 2: Berliner Extremwerte

== Cityscape and architecture ==
=== Cityscape ===
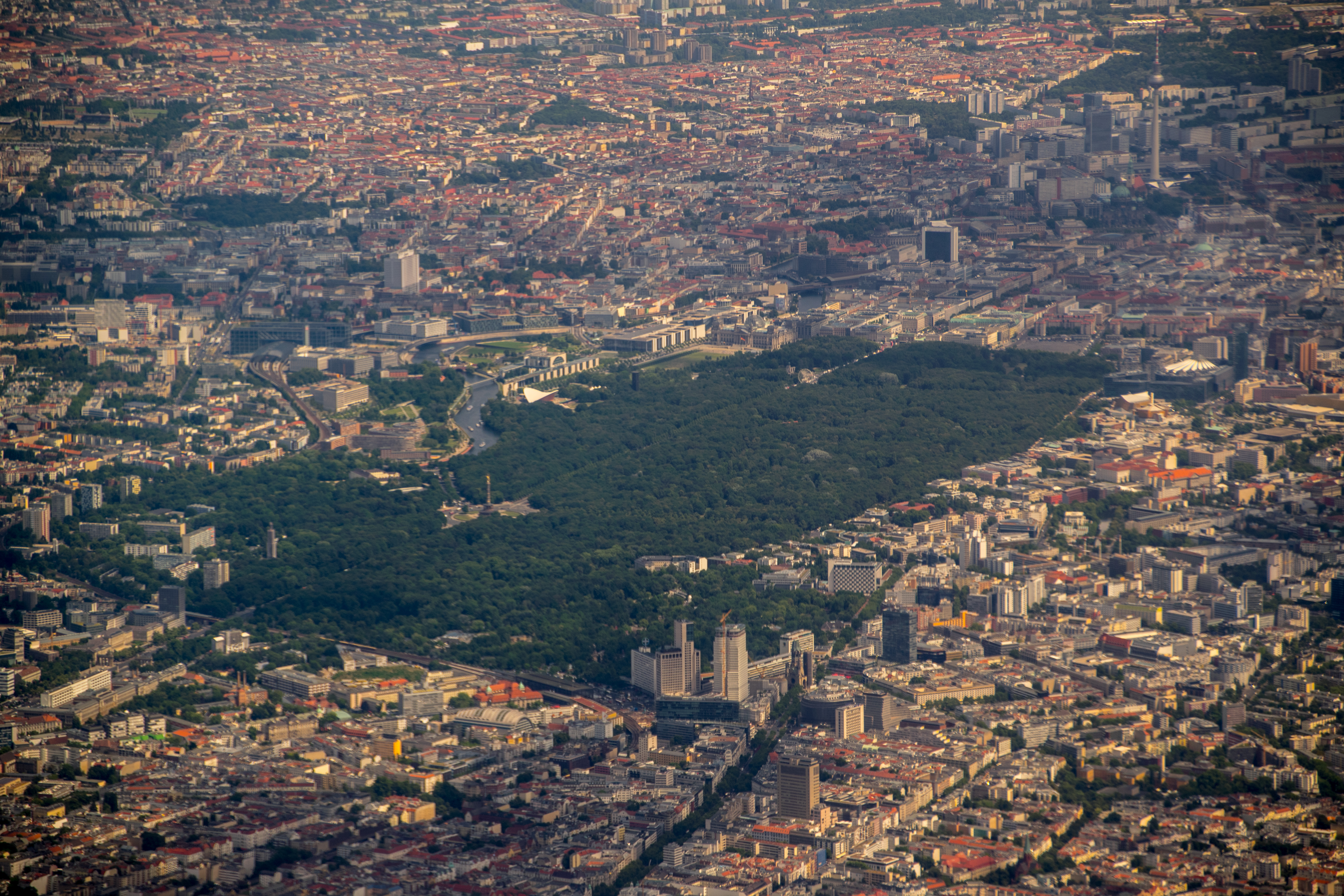
Aerial photo over central Berlin showing City West, Potsdamer Platz, Unter den Linden and Alexanderplatz

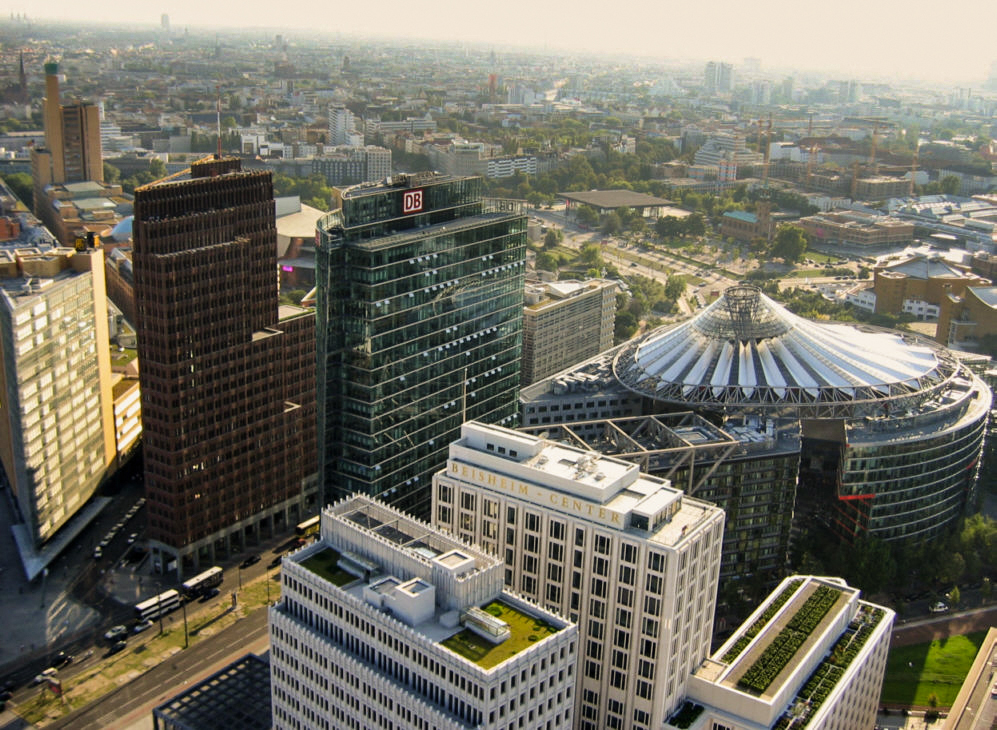
Potsdamer Platz from above

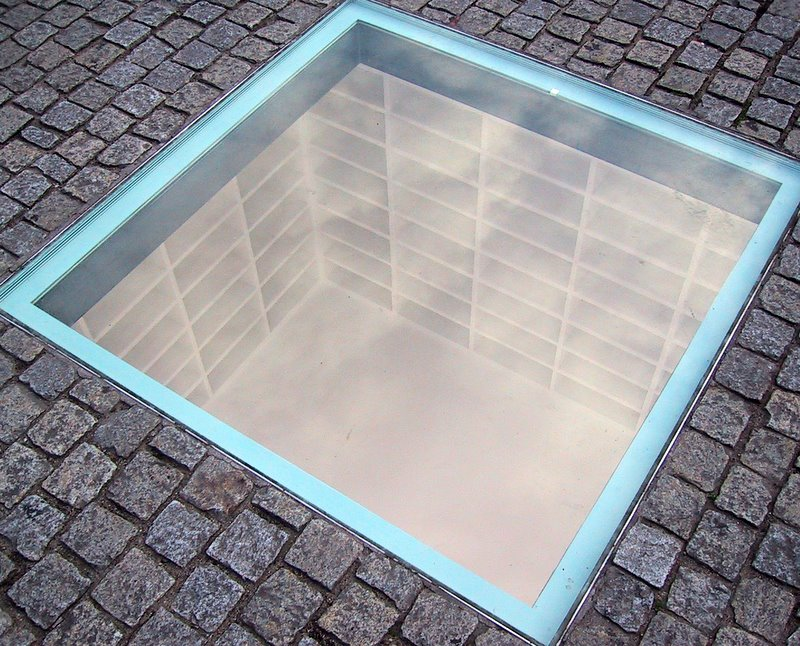
"The Empty Library", a memorial commemorating the 1933 Nazi book burning at Bebelplatz

Berlin's history has left the city with a polycentric metropolitan area and an eclectic mix of architecture. The city's appearance today has been predominantly shaped by German history during the 20th century. 17% of Berlin's buildings are Gründerzeit or earlier and nearly 25% are of the 1920s and 1930s, when Berlin played a part in the origin of modern architecture.

Devastated by the bombing of Berlin in World War II, many of the buildings that had survived in both East and West were demolished during the postwar period. After the reunification, many important heritage structures have been reconstructed, including the Forum Fridericianum along with the Berlin State Opera, Charlottenburg Palace, Gendarmenmarkt, Alte Kommandantur, as well as the City Palace.

The tallest buildings in Berlin are spread across the urban area, with clusters at Potsdamer Platz, City West, and Alexanderplatz.

Over 1/3 of the city's area consists of green and open space; the Großer Tiergarten, one of the largest and most popular parks in Berlin is located in the city centre.

=== Architecture ===
The Fernsehturm (TV tower) at Alexanderplatz in Mitte is among the tallest structures in the European Union at 368 m (1,207 ft). Built in 1969, it is visible throughout most of the central districts of Berlin. The city can be viewed from its 204-meter-high (669 ft) observation floor. Starting here, the Karl-Marx-Allee heads east, an avenue lined by monumental residential buildings, designed in the Socialist Classicism style. Adjacent to this area is the Rotes Rathaus (City Hall), with its distinctive red-brick architecture. In front of it is the Neptunbrunnen, a fountain featuring a mythological group of Tritons, personifications of the four main Prussian rivers, and Neptune on top of it. Nearby is the Nikolaiviertel, the reconstructed oldest settlement area in the city.

The Brandenburg Gate is an iconic landmark of Berlin and Germany; it stands as a symbol of eventful European history and of unity and peace. The Reichstag building is the traditional seat of the German Parliament. It was remodeled by British architect Norman Foster in the 1990s and features a glass dome over the session area, which allows free public access to the parliamentary proceedings and magnificent views of the city.

The East Side Gallery is an open-air exhibition of art painted directly on the last existing portions of the Berlin Wall. It is the largest remaining evidence of the city's historical division.

The Gendarmenmarkt is a neoclassical square in Berlin, the name of which derives from the headquarters of the famous Gens d'armes regiment located here in the 18th century. Two similarly designed cathedrals border it, the Französischer Dom with its observation platform and the Deutscher Dom. The Konzerthaus (Concert Hall), home of the Berlin Symphony Orchestra, stands between the two cathedrals.

The Museum Island in the River Spree houses five museums built from 1830 to 1930 and is a UNESCO World Heritage site. Restoration and construction of a main entrance to all museums (James Simon Gallery), as well as reconstruction of the Berlin Palace (Stadtschloss) were completed. Also on the island and next to the Lustgarten and palace is Berlin Cathedral, emperor William II's ambitious attempt to create a Protestant counterpart to St. Peter's Basilica in Rome. A large crypt houses the remains of some of the earlier Prussian royal family. St. Hedwig's Cathedral is Berlin's Roman Catholic cathedral.

Unter den Linden is a tree-lined east–west avenue from the Brandenburg Gate to the Berlin Palace, and was once Berlin's premier promenade. Many Classical buildings line the street, and part of Humboldt University is there. Friedrichstraße was Berlin's legendary street during the Golden Twenties. It combines 20th-century traditions with the modern architecture of today's Berlin.

Potsdamer Platz is an entire quarter built from scratch after the Wall came down. To the west of Potsdamer Platz is the Kulturforum, which houses the Gemäldegalerie, and is flanked by the Neue Nationalgalerie and the Berliner Philharmonie. The Memorial to the Murdered Jews of Europe, a Holocaust memorial, is to the north.

The area around Hackescher Markt is home to fashionable culture, with countless clothing outlets, clubs, bars, and galleries. This includes the Hackesche Höfe, a conglomeration of buildings around several courtyards, reconstructed around 1996. The nearby New Synagogue is the center of Jewish culture.

The Straße des 17. Juni, connecting the Brandenburg Gate and Ernst-Reuter-Platz, serves as the central east–west axis. Its name commemorates the uprisings in East Berlin of 17 June 1953. Approximately halfway from the Brandenburg Gate is the Großer Stern, a circular traffic island on which the Siegessäule (Victory Column) is situated. This monument, built to commemorate Prussia's victories, was relocated in 1938–39 from its previous position in front of the Reichstag.

The Kurfürstendamm is home to some of Berlin's luxurious stores with the Kaiser Wilhelm Memorial Church at its eastern end on Breitscheidplatz. The church was destroyed in the Second World War and left in ruins. Nearby on Tauentzienstraße is KaDeWe, claimed to be continental Europe's largest department store. The Rathaus Schöneberg, where John F. Kennedy made his famous "Ich bin ein Berliner!" speech, is in Tempelhof-Schöneberg.

West of the center, Bellevue Palace is the residence of the German President. Charlottenburg Palace, which was burnt out in the Second World War, is the largest historical palace in Berlin.

The Funkturm Berlin is a 150-meter-tall (490 ft) lattice radio tower in the fairground area, built between 1924 and 1926. It is the only observation tower which stands on insulators and has a restaurant 55 m (180 ft) and an observation deck 126 m (413 ft) above ground, which is reachable by a windowed elevator.

The Oberbaumbrücke over the Spree river is Berlin's most iconic bridge, connecting the now-combined boroughs of Friedrichshain and Kreuzberg. It carries vehicles, pedestrians, and the U1 Berlin U-Bahn line. The bridge was completed in a brick gothic style in 1896, replacing the former wooden bridge with an upper deck for the U-Bahn. The center portion was demolished in 1945 to stop the Red Army from crossing. After the war, the repaired bridge served as a checkpoint and border crossing between the Soviet and American sectors, and later between East and West Berlin. In the mid-1950s, it was closed to vehicles, and after the construction of the Berlin Wall in 1961, pedestrian traffic was heavily restricted. Following German reunification, the center portion was reconstructed with a steel frame, and U-Bahn service resumed in 1995.

Washingtonplatz is located in the Moabit area, on the southern side of Berlin central station, between the train station building and the Spree, linking the station to the parliament and government quarter. The square was refurbished in 2010-2013, covered in Silesian granite and landscaping features added. The 10-storey glass-clad office building known as Cube Berlin, completed in 2020, is on Washingtonplatz.

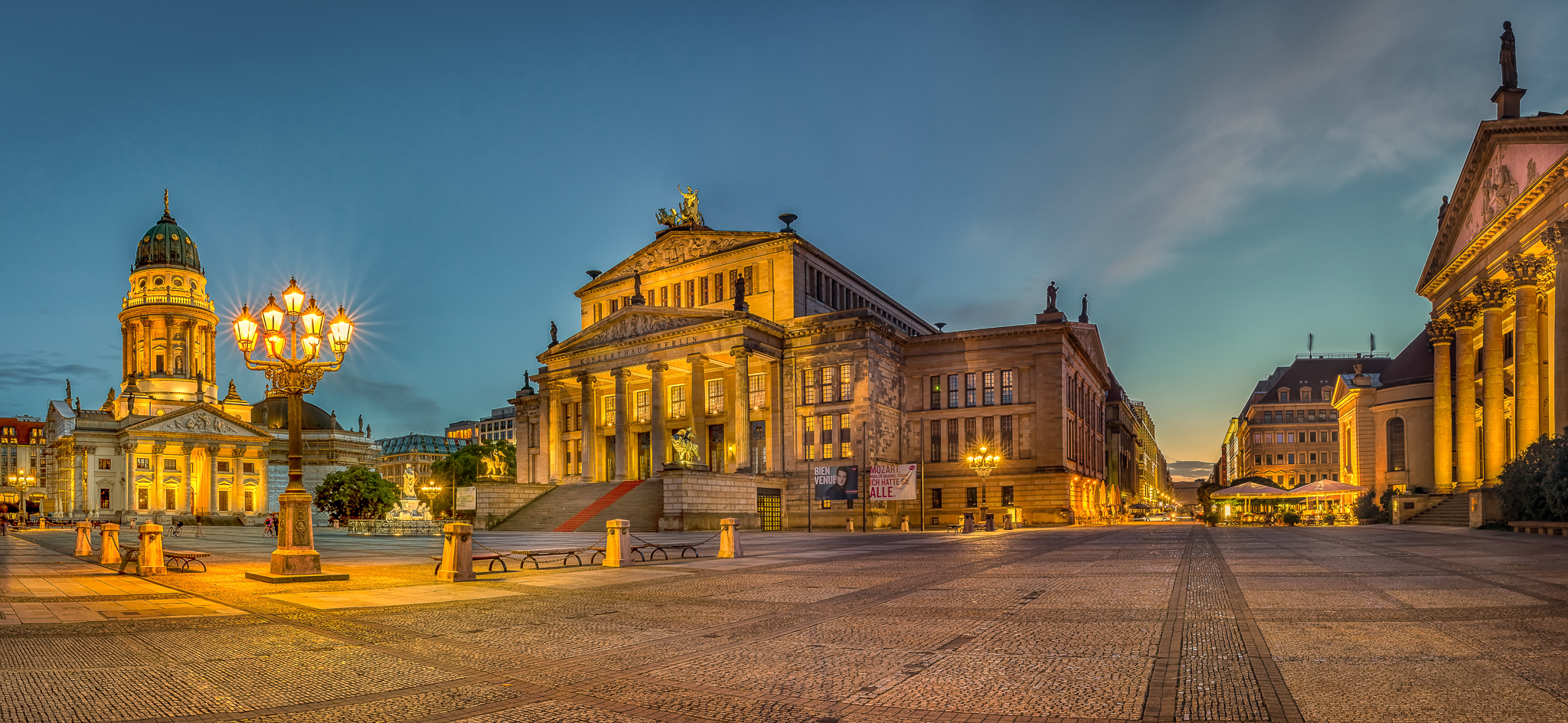
Panorama of the Gendarmenmarkt, showing the Konzerthaus Berlin, flanked by the German Church (left) and French Church (right)

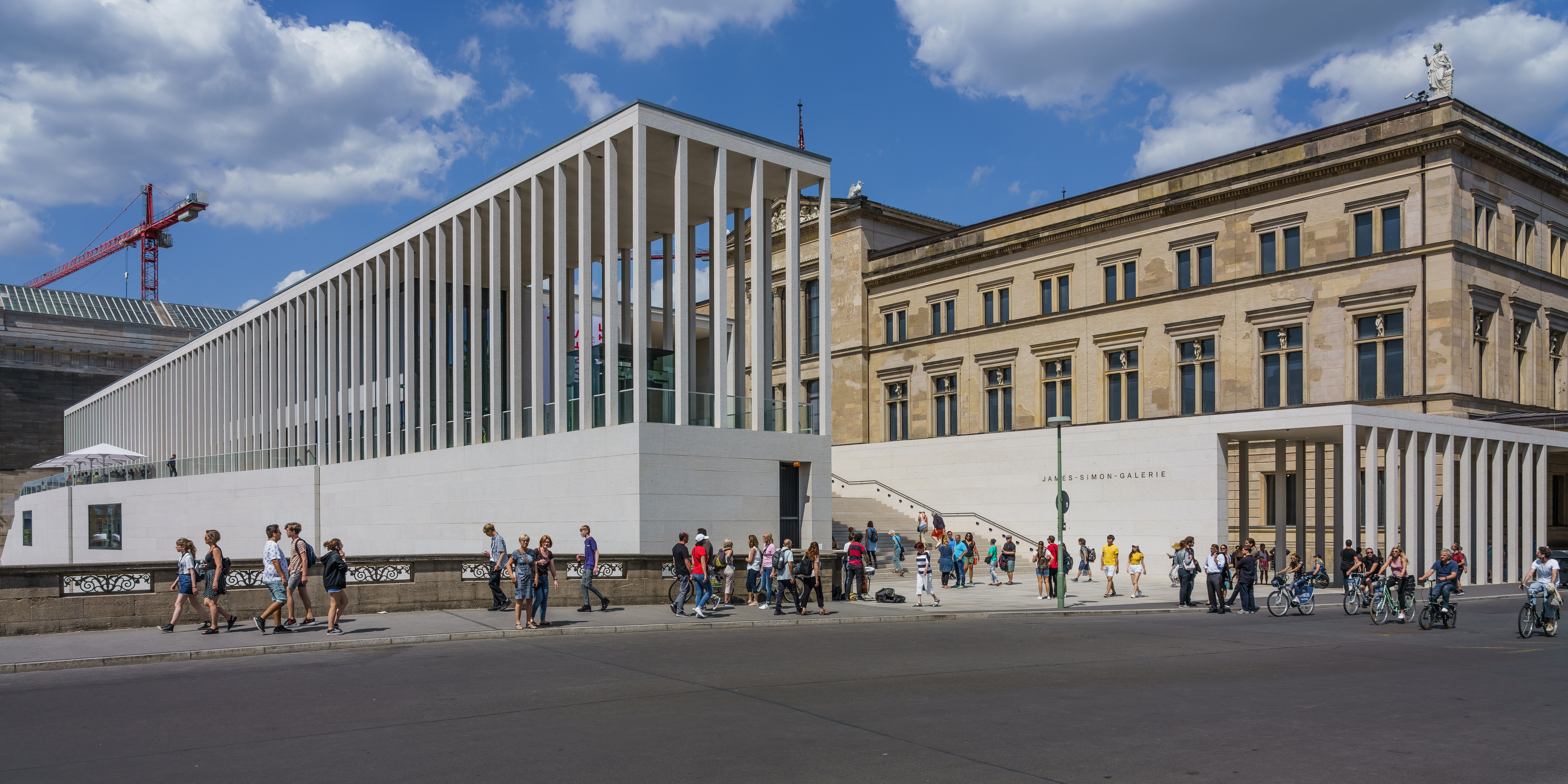
James Simon Gallery

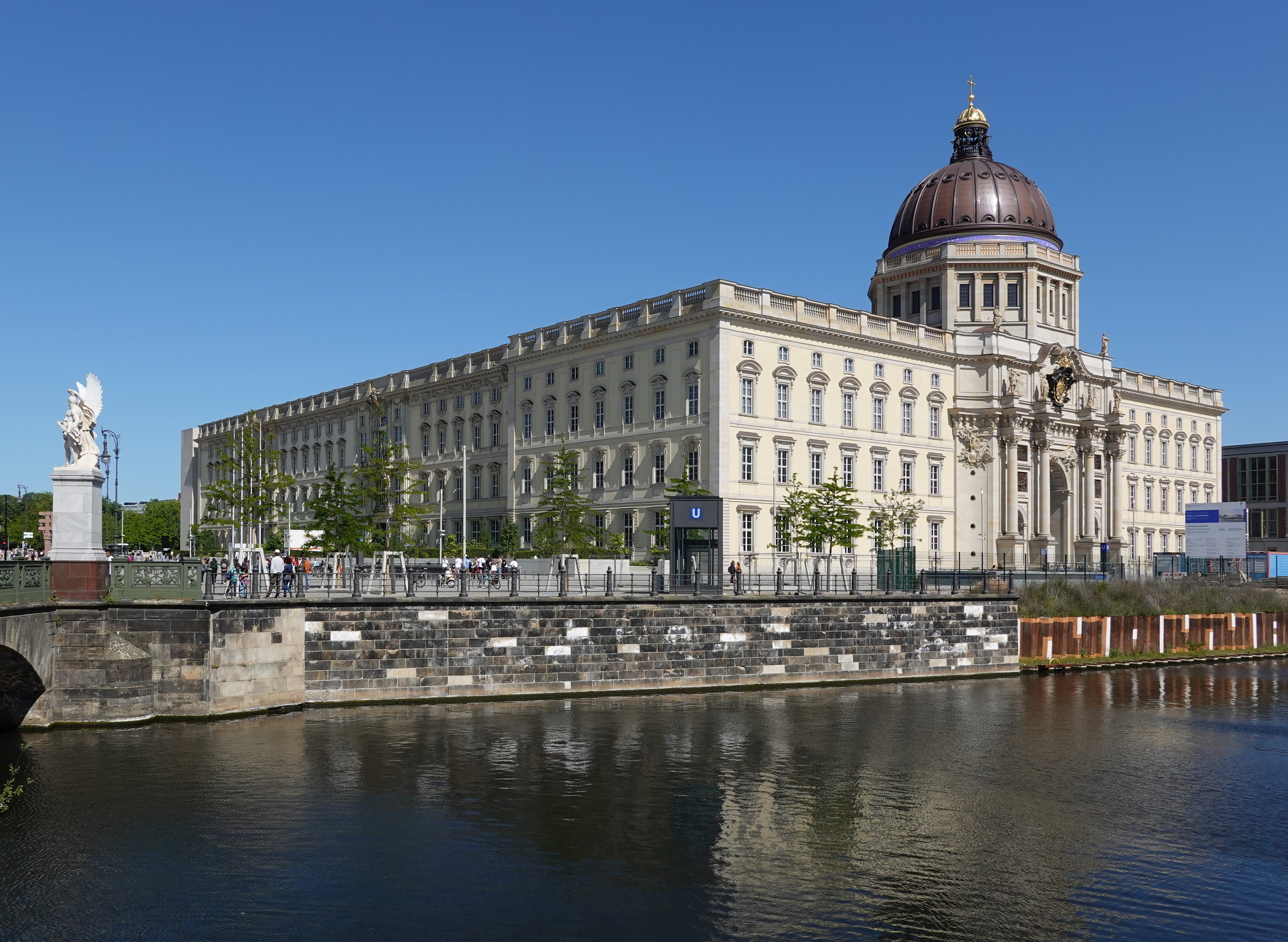
Berlin Palace/Humboldt Forum

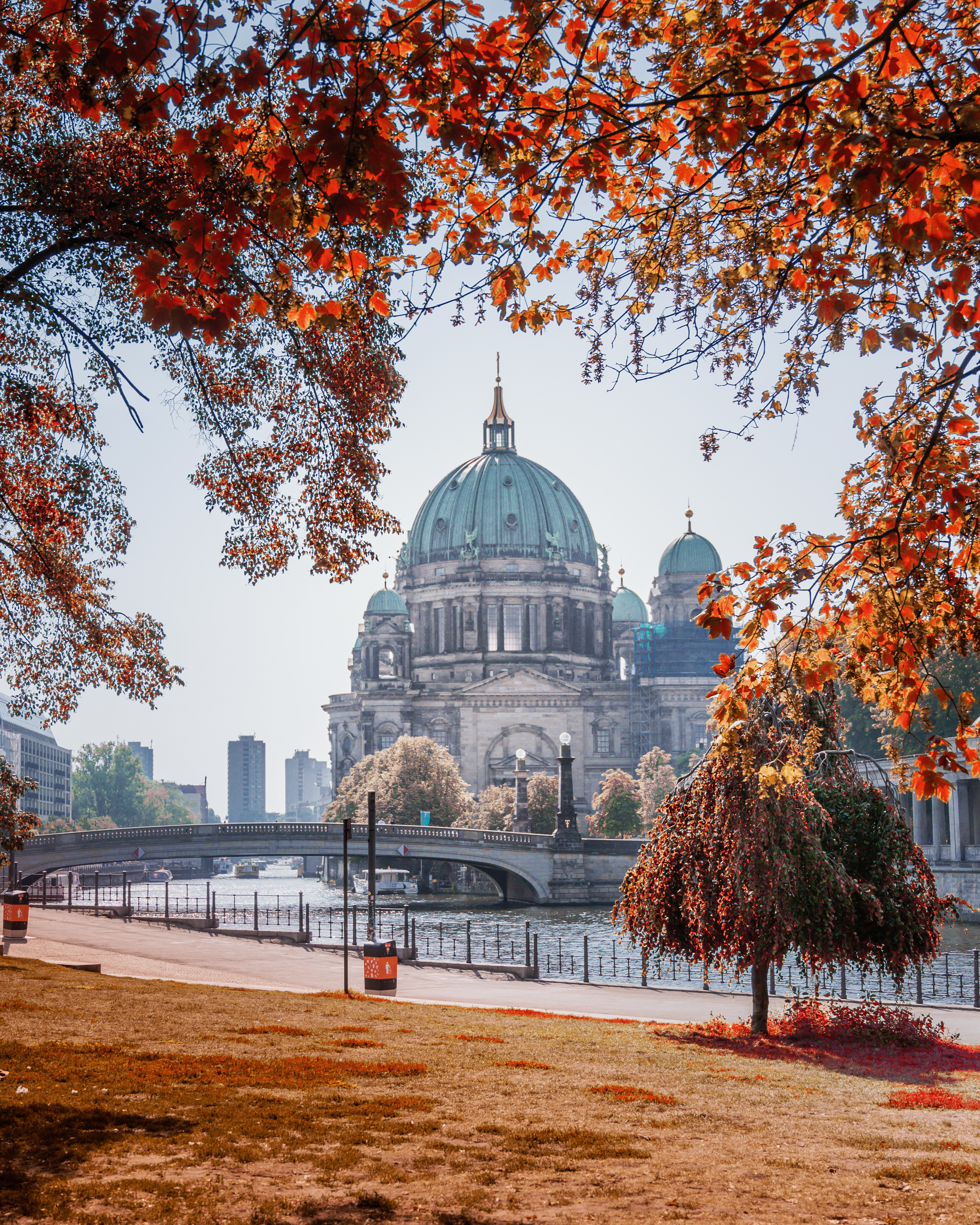
The Berlin Cathedral at Museum Island

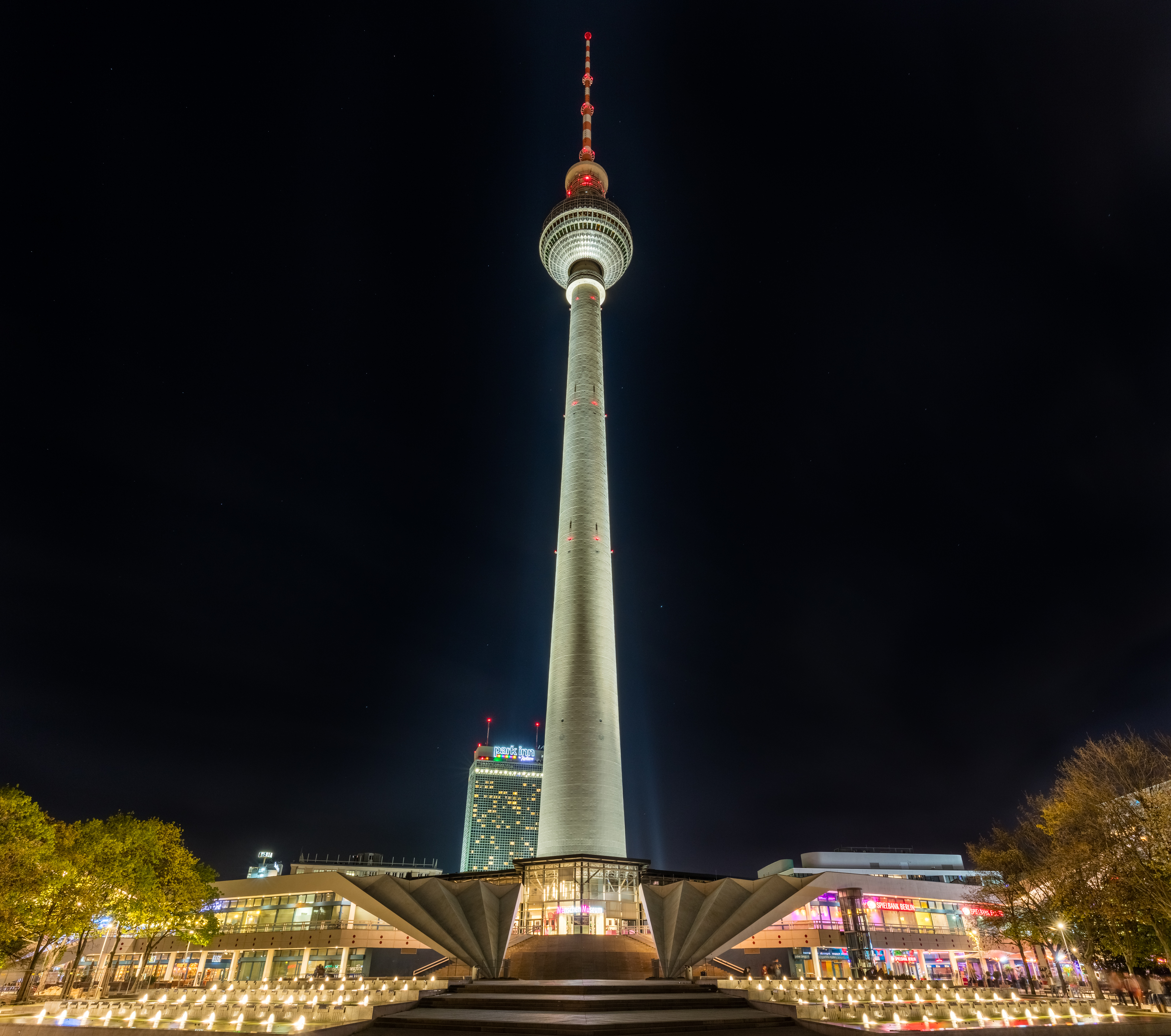
The TV Tower (Berliner Fernsehturm)

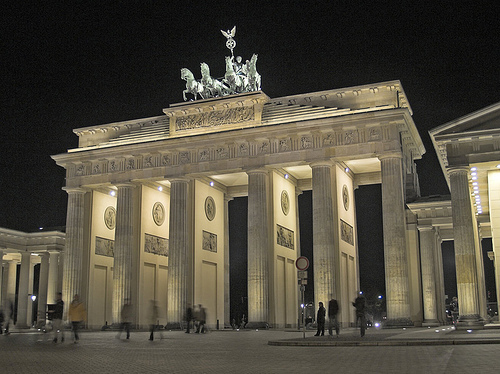
Brandenburg Gate at night

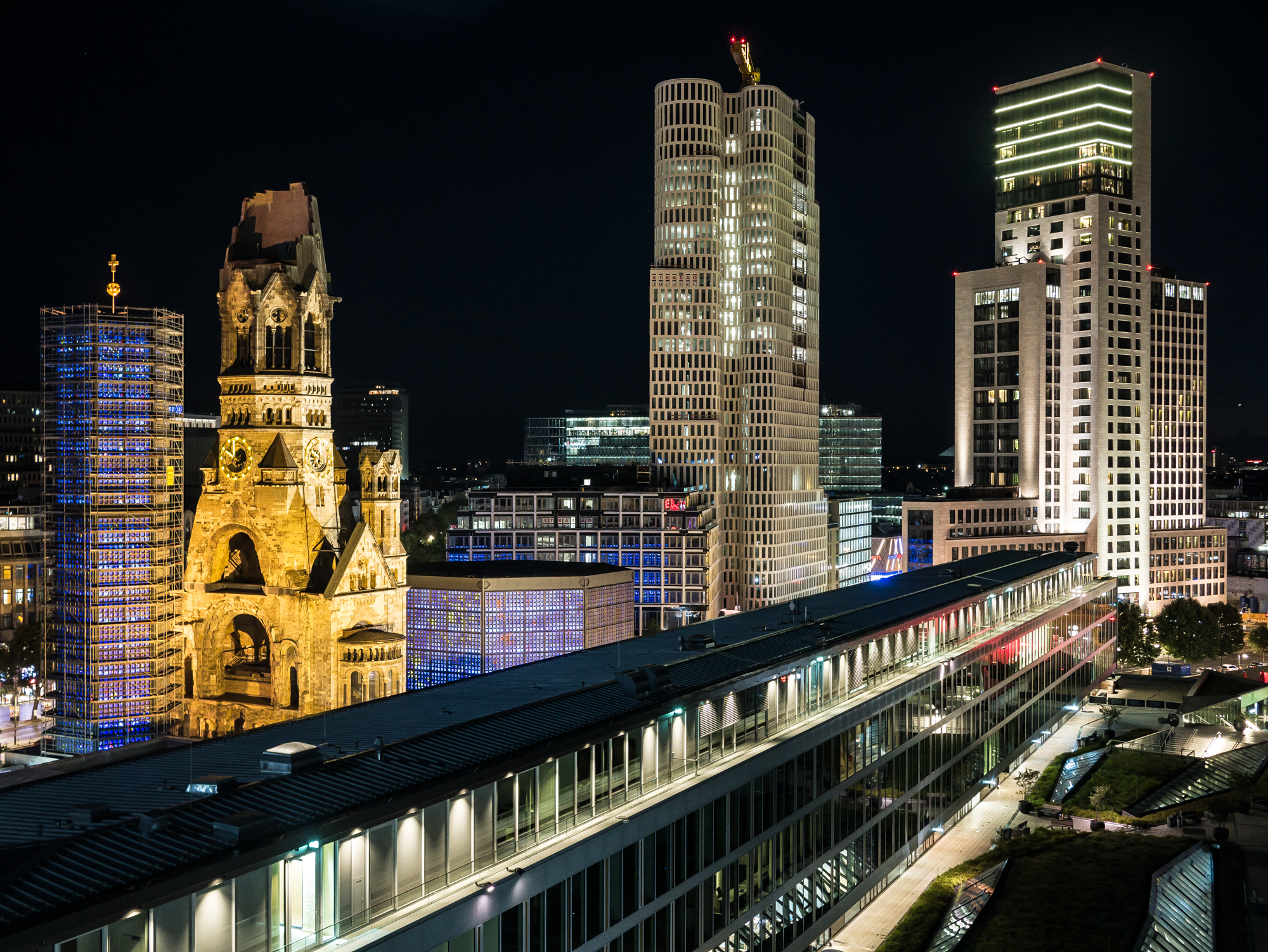
Breitscheidplatz with Kaiser Wilhelm Memorial Church is the center of City West.

Schloss Charlottenburg, one of the largest palaces in the world

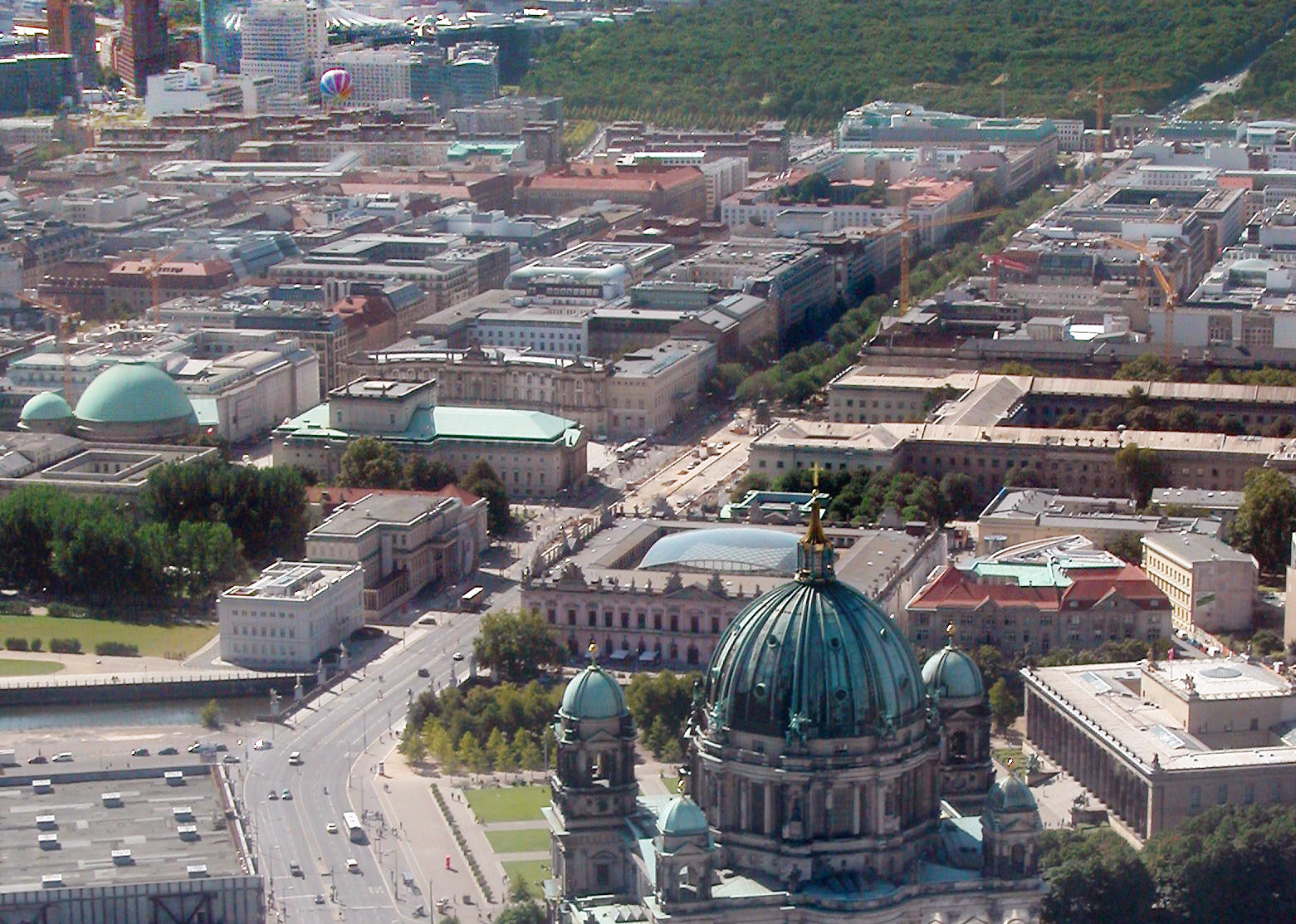
View over Unter den Linden

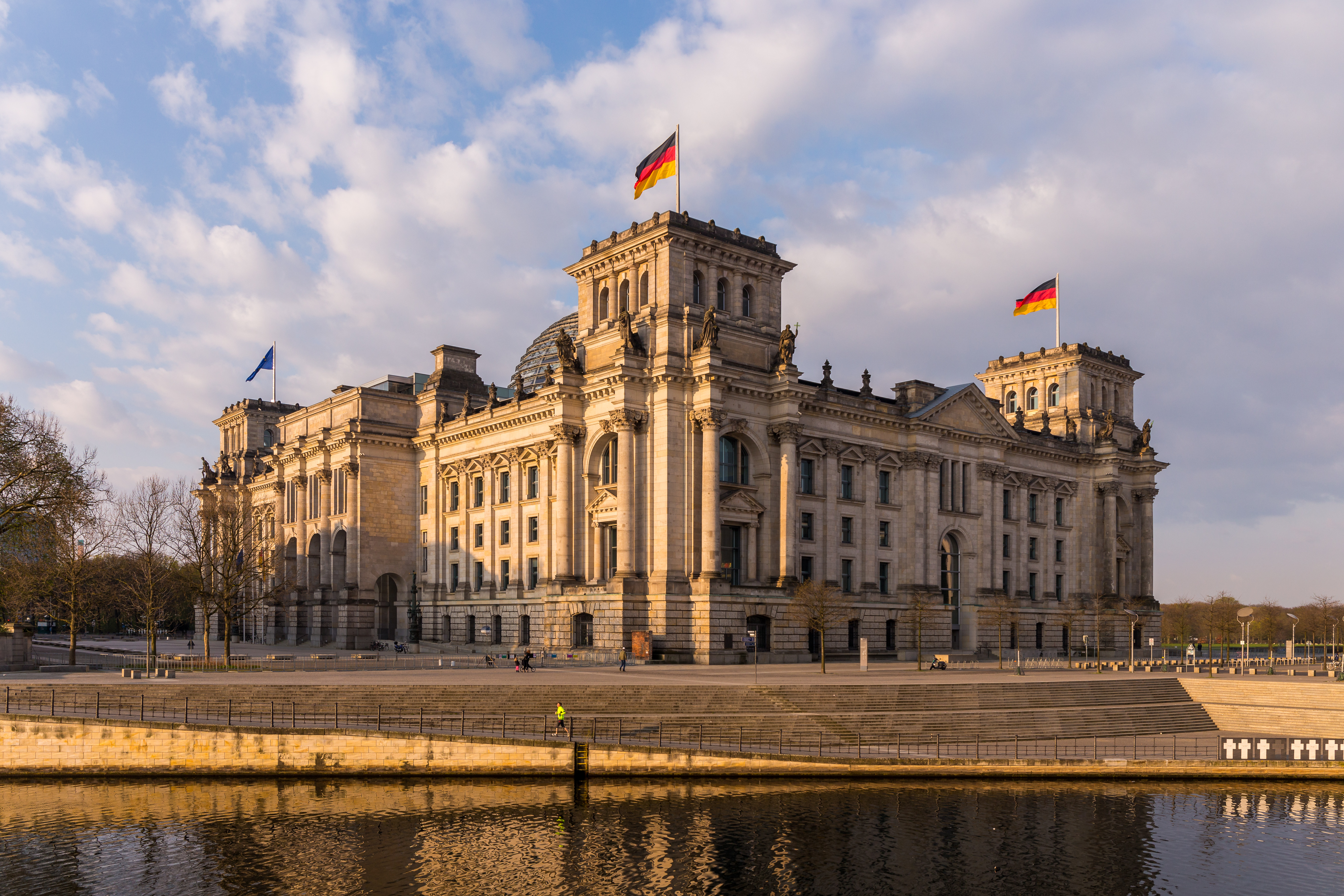
Reichstag building

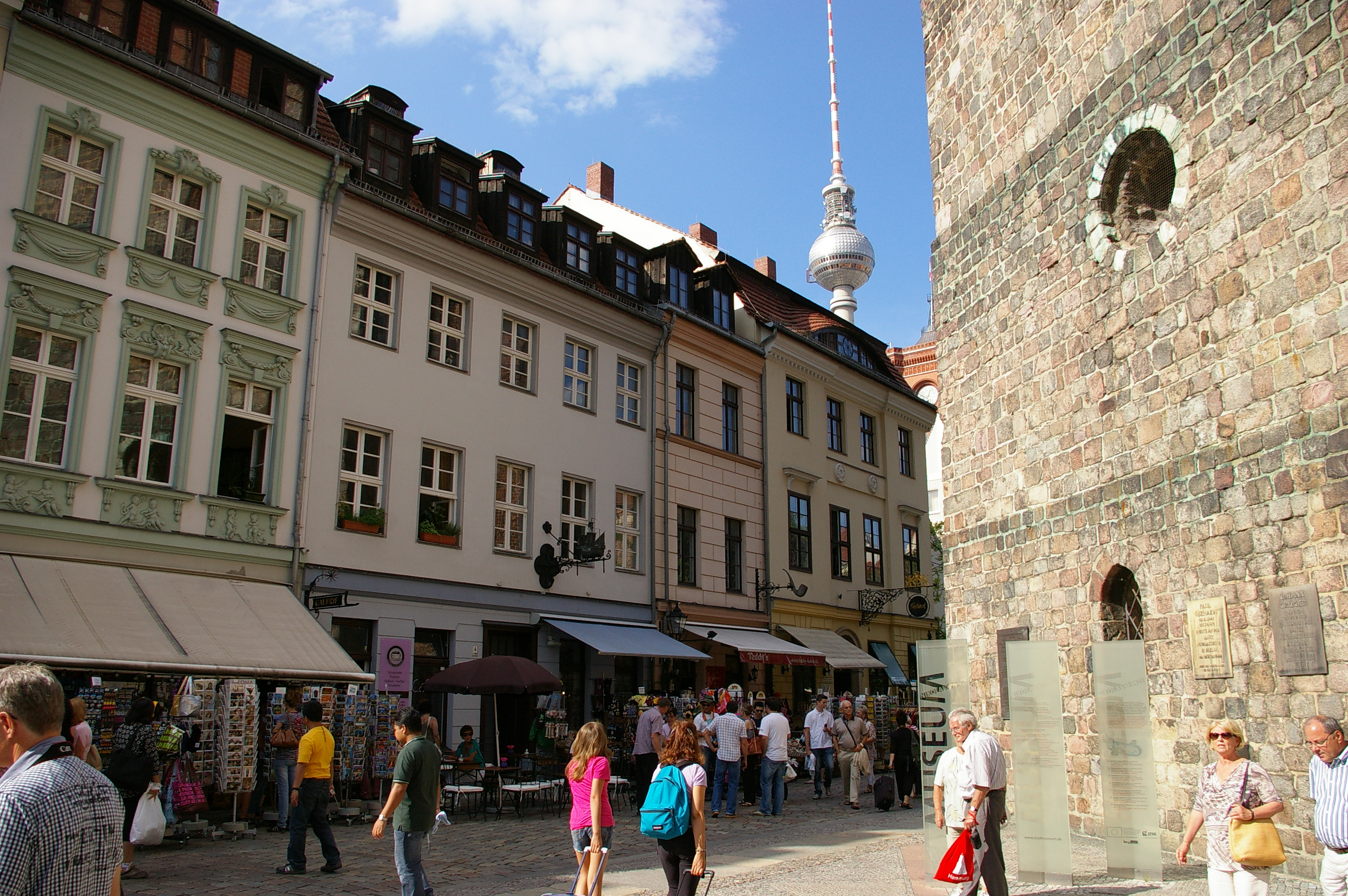
Nikolaiviertel, one of the oldest parts of Berlin

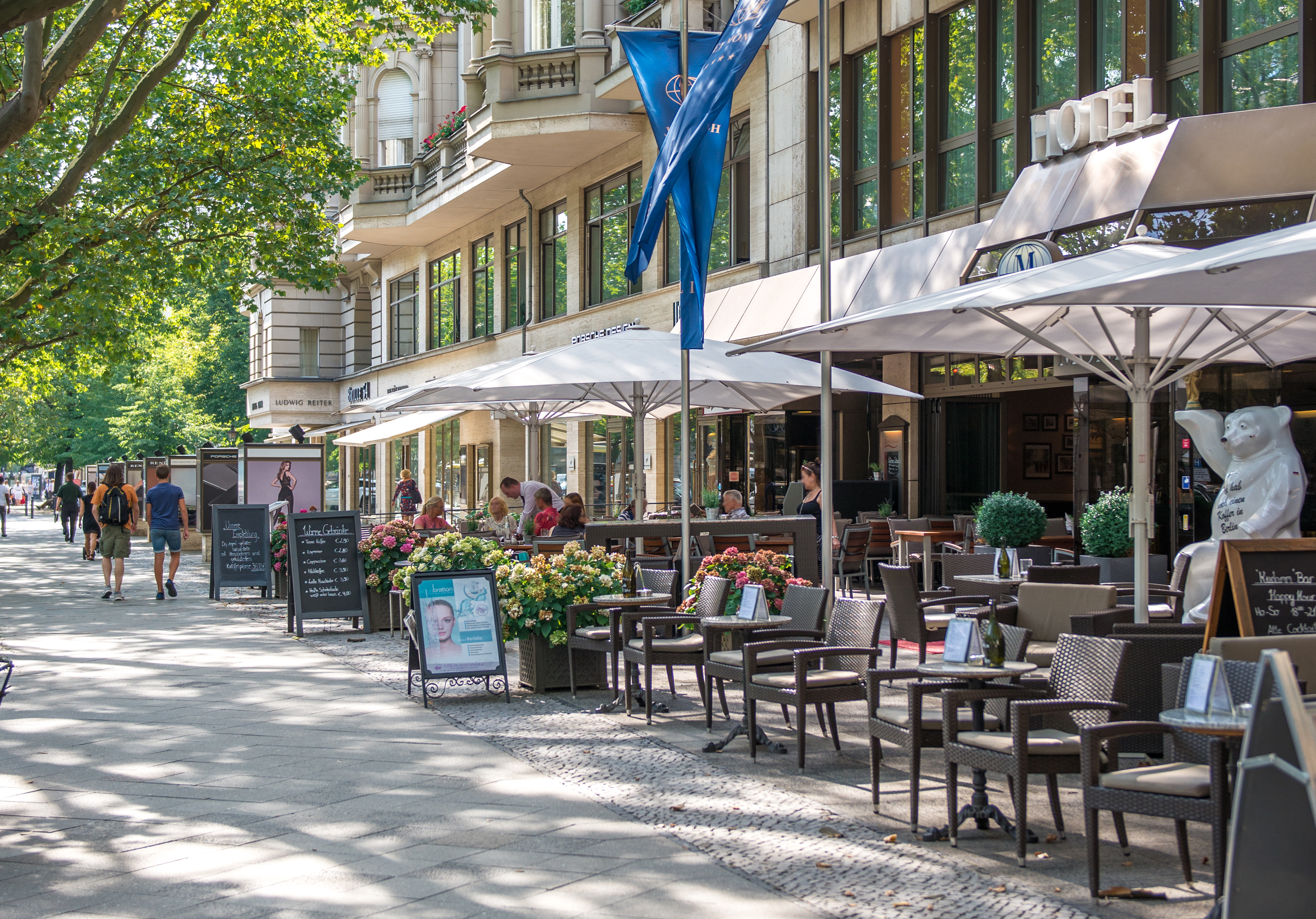
Kurfürstendamm

== Demographics ==
Berlin population pyramid in 2022

Berlin's population, 1880–2012

At the end of 2024 the city-state of Berlin had 3.897 million registered inhabitants, in an area of 891 km^{2} (344 sq mi). Berlin is the most populous city proper in the European Union. In 2021, the urban area of Berlin had a population of over 4.6 million inhabitants. As of 2019, the functional urban area was home to about 5.2 million people. The entire Berlin-Brandenburg capital region has a population of more than 6 million in an area of 30,546 km^{2} (11,794 sq mi).

Historical population
| Year | Pop. | ±% |
|---|---|---|
| 1721 | 65,300 | — |
| 1750 | 113,289 | +73.5% |
| 1800 | 172,132 | +51.9% |
| 1815 | 197,717 | +14.9% |
| 1825 | 220,277 | +11.4% |
| 1840 | 330,230 | +49.9% |
| 1852 | 438,958 | +32.9% |
| 1861 | 547,571 | +24.7% |
| 1871 | 826,341 | +50.9% |
| 1880 | 1,122,330 | +35.8% |
| 1890 | 1,578,794 | +40.7% |
| 1900 | 1,888,848 | +19.6% |
| 1910 | 2,071,257 | +9.7% |
| 1920 | 3,879,409 | +87.3% |
| 1925 | 4,082,778 | +5.2% |
| 1933 | 4,221,024 | +3.4% |
| 1939 | 4,330,640 | +2.6% |
| 1945 | 3,064,629 | −29.2% |
| 1950 | 3,336,026 | +8.9% |
| 1960 | 3,274,016 | −1.9% |
| 1970 | 3,208,719 | −2.0% |
| 1980 | 3,048,759 | −5.0% |
| 1990 | 3,433,695 | +12.6% |
| 2000 | 3,388,434 | −1.3% |
| 2011 | 3,292,365 | −2.8% |
| 2022 | 3,596,999 | +9.3% |
Population size may be affected by changes in administrative divisions.

In 2014, the city-state Berlin had 37,368 live births (+7%), a record number since 1991. The number of deaths was 32,314. Almost 2 million households were counted in the city, of which 54% were inhabited by a single person. More than 337,000 families with children under the age of 18 lived in Berlin. In 2014, the German capital registered a migration surplus of approximately 40,000 people.

=== Nationalities ===
Residents without a migration background in Berlin on 31 December 2020 by district

Residents by citizenship (31 December 2023)
| Country | Population |
|---|---|
| Germany | 2,931,731 |
| Turkey | 107,022 |
| Ukraine | 62,495 |
| Poland | 54,099 |
| Syria | 48,301 |
| Russia | 37,815 |
| Italy | 33,732 |
| India | 33,257 |
| Bulgaria | 33,256 |
| Romania | 28,843 |
| Vietnam | 25,851 |
| Afghanistan | 22,172 |
| United States | 21,743 |
| Serbia | 21,305 |
| France | 19,484 |

National and international migration into the city has a long history. In 1685, after the revocation of the Edict of Nantes in France, the city responded with the Edict of Potsdam, which guaranteed religious freedom and tax-free status to French Huguenot refugees for ten years. The Greater Berlin Act in 1920 incorporated many suburbs and surrounding cities of Berlin. It formed most of the territory that comprises modern Berlin and increased the population from 1.9 million to 4 million.

Chinese migration to Berlin dates back to the 19th century, with a substantial community developing during the Weimar Republic. By the 1920s, Chinese students and intellectuals were concentrated around Charlottenburg, while a smaller community of traders and merchants, many originating from Qingtian and Wenzhou in southern Zhejiang, settled around the former Schlesischer Bahnhof in Friedrichshain. The community was subsequently disrupted by Nazi persecution and the Second World War, before migration expanded again during the late 20th-century. By 2025, Berlin had approximately 13,660 registered Chinese nationals, making it home to the largest Chinese community second only to Munich.

Active immigration and asylum politics in West Berlin triggered waves of immigration in the 1960s and 1970s. Berlin is home to at least 180,000 Turkish and Turkish German residents, making it the largest Turkish community outside of Turkey. In the 1990s the Aussiedlergesetze enabled immigration to Germany of some residents from the former Soviet Union. Today ethnic Germans from countries of the former Soviet Union make up the largest portion of the Russian-speaking community. The last decade experienced an influx from various Western countries and some African regions. A portion of the African immigrants have settled in the Afrikanisches Viertel. Young Germans, EU-Europeans and Israelis have also settled in the city.

In December 2019 there were 777,345 registered residents of foreign nationality and another 542,975 German citizens with a "migration background" (Migrationshintergrund, MH), meaning they or one of their parents immigrated to Germany after 1955. Foreign residents of Berlin originate from about 190 countries. 48 percent of the residents under the age of 15 have a migration background in 2017. Berlin in 2009 was estimated to have 100,000 to 250,000 unregistered inhabitants. Boroughs of Berlin with a significant number of migrants or foreign born population are Mitte, Neukölln and Friedrichshain-Kreuzberg. The number of Arabic speakers in Berlin could be higher than 150,000. There are at least 40,000 Berliners with Syrian citizenship, third only behind Turkish and Polish citizens. The 2015 refugee crisis made Berlin Europe's capital of Arab culture. Berlin is among the cities in Germany that received the biggest amount of refugees after the 2022 Russian invasion of Ukraine. As of November 2022, an estimated 85,000 Ukrainian refugees were registered in Berlin, making Berlin the most popular destination of Ukrainian refugees in Germany.

Berlin has an active expatriate community, for instance increasingly students and highly skilled workers from India. Therefore, Berlin sustains a broad variety of English-based speakers. Speaking a particular type of English does attract prestige and cultural capital in Berlin.

=== Languages ===
German is the official and predominant spoken language in Berlin. It is a West Germanic language that derives most of its vocabulary from the Germanic branch of the Indo-European language family. German is one of 24 languages of the European Union, and one of the three working languages of the European Commission.

Berlinerisch or Berlinisch is not a dialect linguistically. It is spoken in Berlin and the surrounding metropolitan area. It originates from a Brandenburgish variant. The dialect is now seen more like a sociolect, largely through increased immigration and trends among the educated population to speak standard German in everyday life.

The most commonly spoken foreign languages in Berlin are Turkish, Polish, English, Persian, Arabic, Italian, Bulgarian, Russian, Romanian, Kurdish, Serbo-Croatian, French, Spanish and Vietnamese. Turkish, Arabic, Kurdish, and Serbo-Croatian are heard more often in the western part due to the large Middle Eastern and former-Yugoslavian communities. Polish, English, Russian, and Vietnamese have more native speakers in East Berlin.

=== Religion ===
(2022)
1. Not religious/Atheist 72 (70.9%)
2. EKD Protestants 15 (14.8%)
3. Catholics 9 (8.87%)
4. Islam 4 (3.94%)
5. Jewish 1 (0.99%)
6. Other 0.5 (0.49%)

On the report of the 2011 census, approximately 37 percent of the population reported being members of a legally-recognized church or religious organization. The rest either did not belong to such an organization, or there was no information available about them.

The largest religious denomination recorded in 2010 was the Protestant regional church body—the Evangelical Church of Berlin-Brandenburg-Silesian Upper Lusatia (EKBO)—a united church. EKBO is a member of the Protestant Church in Germany (EKD) and of the Union of Protestant Churches in the EKD (UEK). According to the EKBO, their membership accounted for 11.6% of the local population, while the Roman Catholic Church had 7.0% of residents registered as its members. About 3% of the population identify with other Christian denominations (mostly Eastern Orthodox, but also various Protestants). According to the Berlin residents register, in 2018 15% were members of the Evangelical Church, and 9% were members of the Catholic Church. The government keeps a register of members of these churches for tax purposes, because it collects church tax on behalf of the churches. It does not keep records of members of other religious organizations which may collect their own church tax, in this way.

In 2009, approximately 249,000 Muslims were reported by the Office of Statistics to be members of mosques and Islamic religious organizations in Berlin, while in 2016, the newspaper Der Tagesspiegel estimated that about 350,000 Muslims observed Ramadan in Berlin. In 2019, about 437,000 registered residents, 12% of the total, reported having a migration background from one of the Member states of the Organization of Islamic Cooperation. Between 1992 and 2011 the Muslim population almost doubled.

About 1% of Berliners belong to other religions. Of the estimated population of 30,000–45,000 Jewish residents, approximately 12,000 are registered members of religious organizations.

Berlin is the seat of the Roman Catholic archbishop of Berlin and EKBO's elected chairperson is titled the bishop of EKBO. Furthermore, Berlin is the seat of many Orthodox cathedrals, such as the Cathedral of St. Boris the Baptist, one of the two seats of the Bulgarian Orthodox Diocese of Western and Central Europe, and the Resurrection of Christ Cathedral of the Diocese of Berlin (Patriarchate of Moscow).

The faithful of the different religions and denominations maintain many places of worship in Berlin. The Independent Evangelical Lutheran Church has 8 parishes of different sizes in Berlin. There are 36 Baptist congregations (within Union of Evangelical Free Church Congregations in Germany), 29 New Apostolic Churches, 15 United Methodist churches, 8 Free Evangelical Congregations, four Churches of Christ, Scientist (1st, 2nd, 3rd, and 11th), 6 congregations of the Church of Jesus Christ of Latter-day Saints, an Old Catholic church, and an Anglican church in Berlin. Berlin has more than 80 mosques, 10 synagogues, and 2 Buddhist as well as 4 Hindu temples.

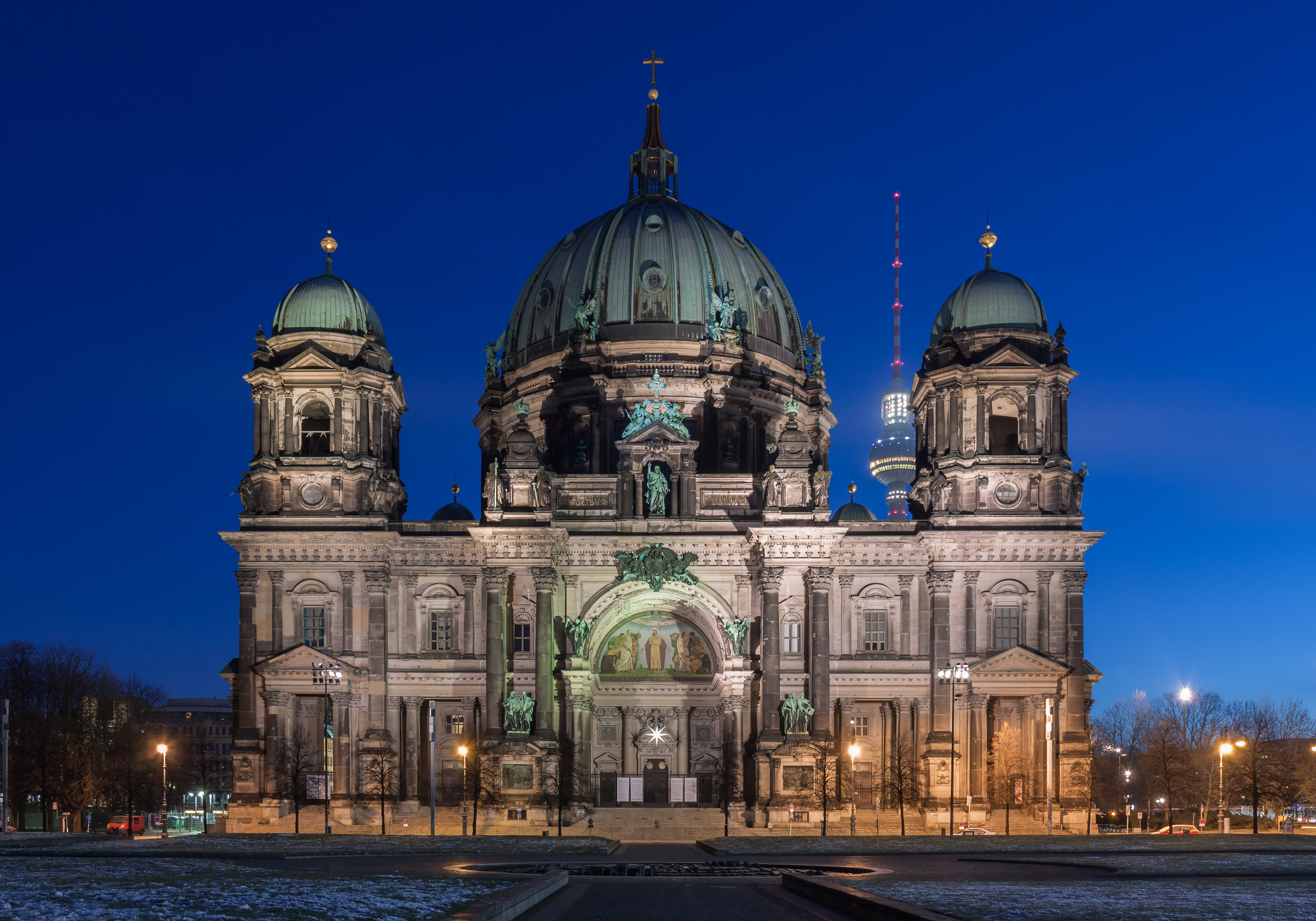
Berlin Cathedral

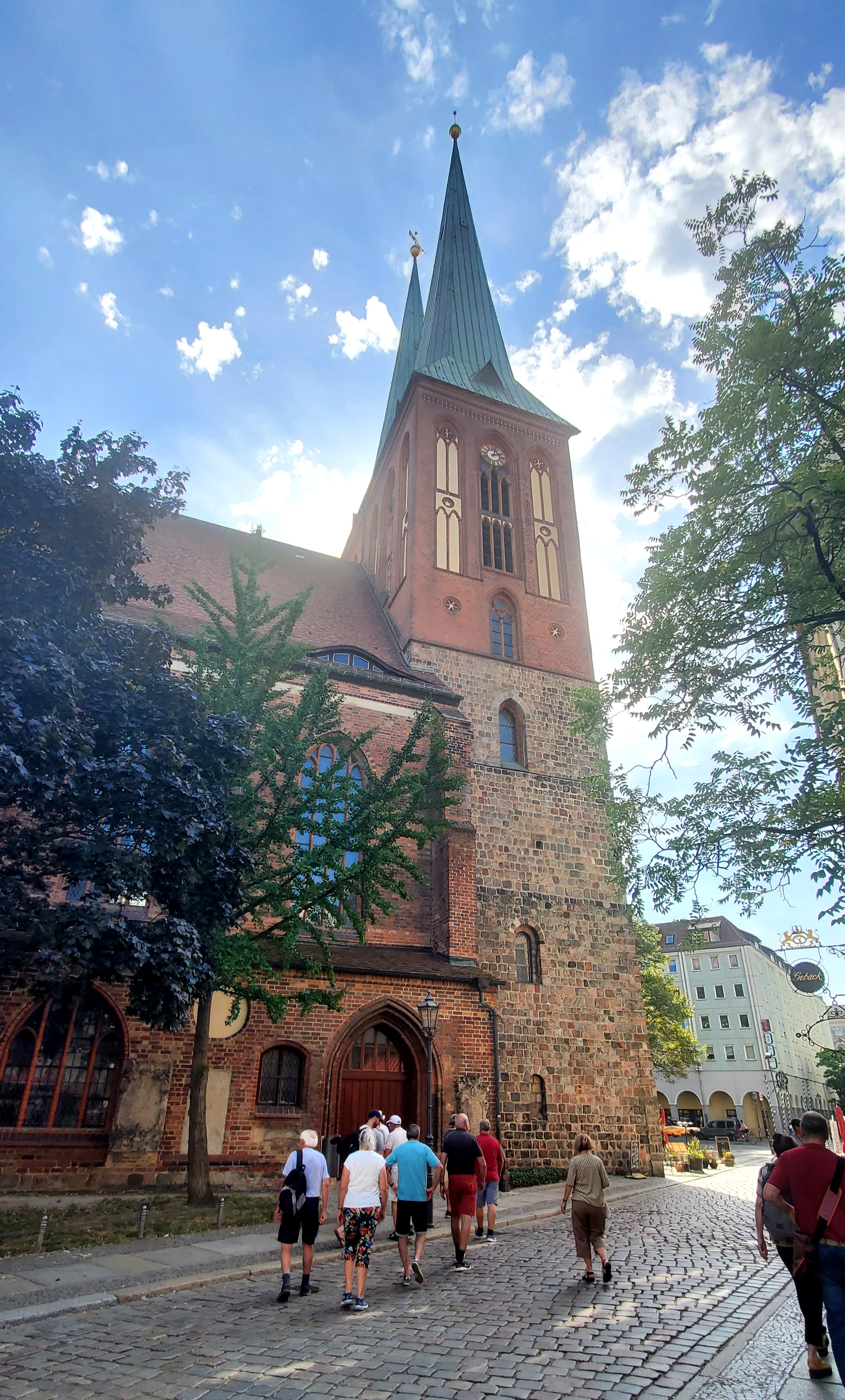
St. Nicholas Church, Berlin

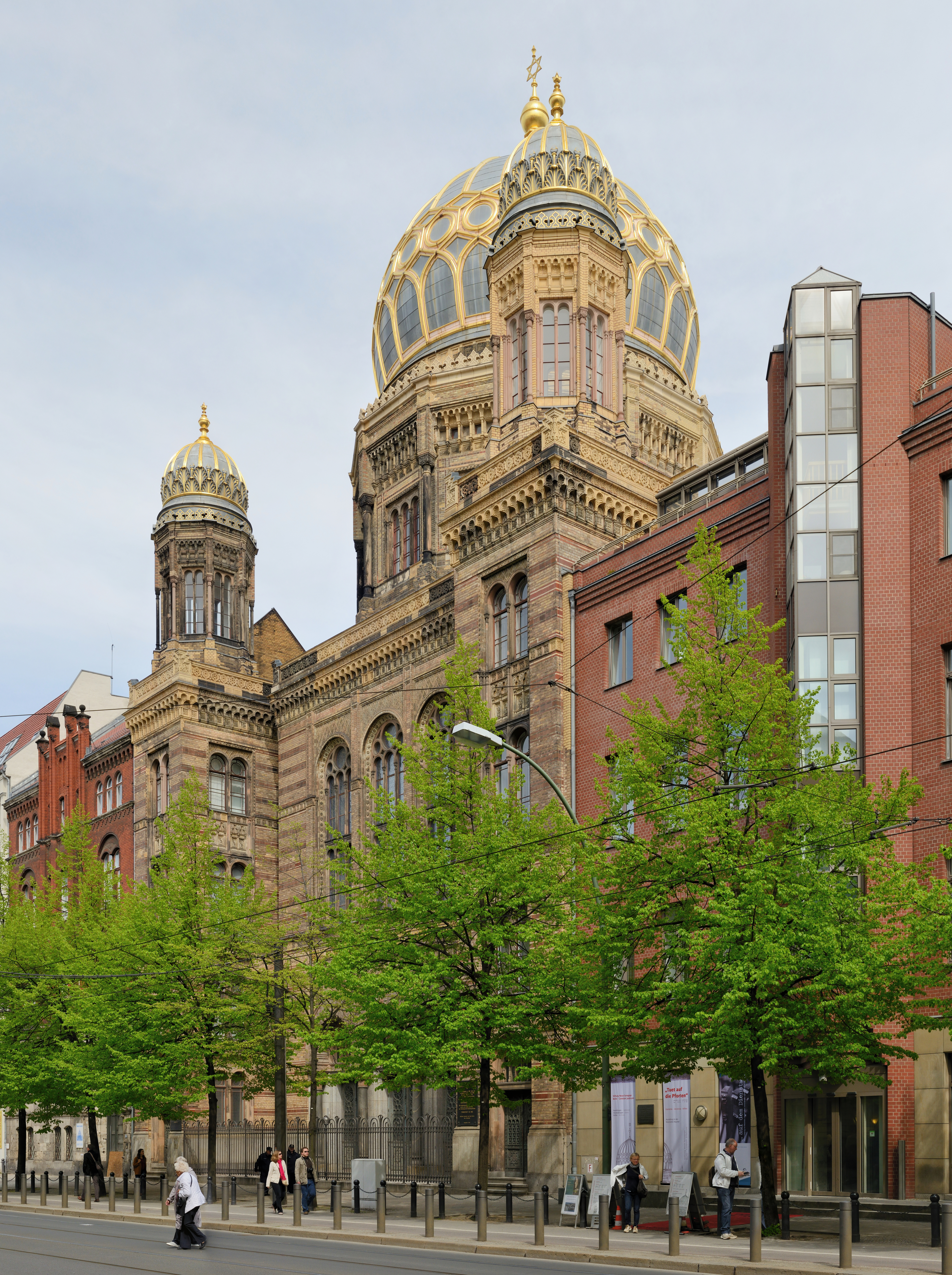
New Synagogue

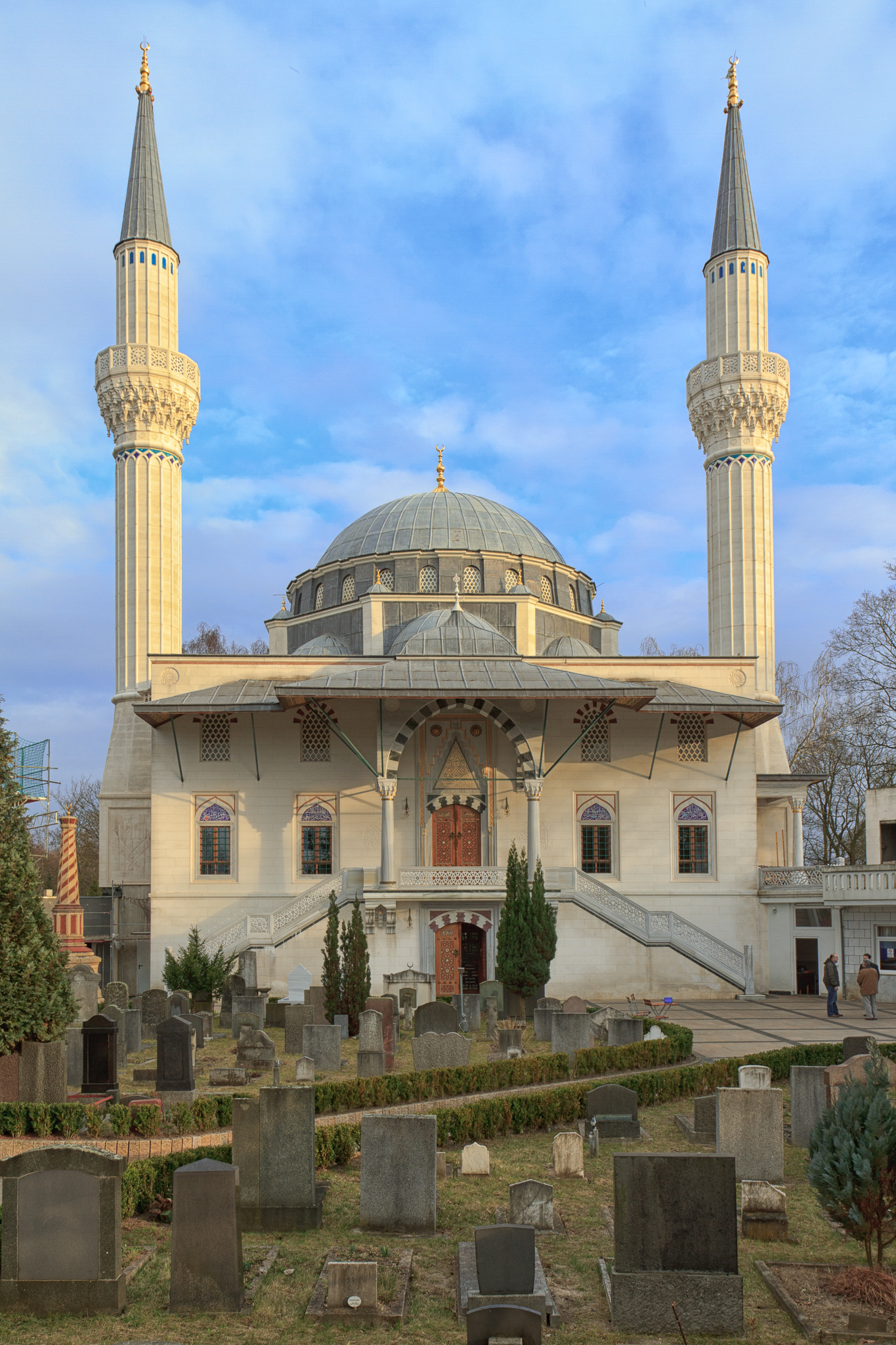
Şehitlik Mosque

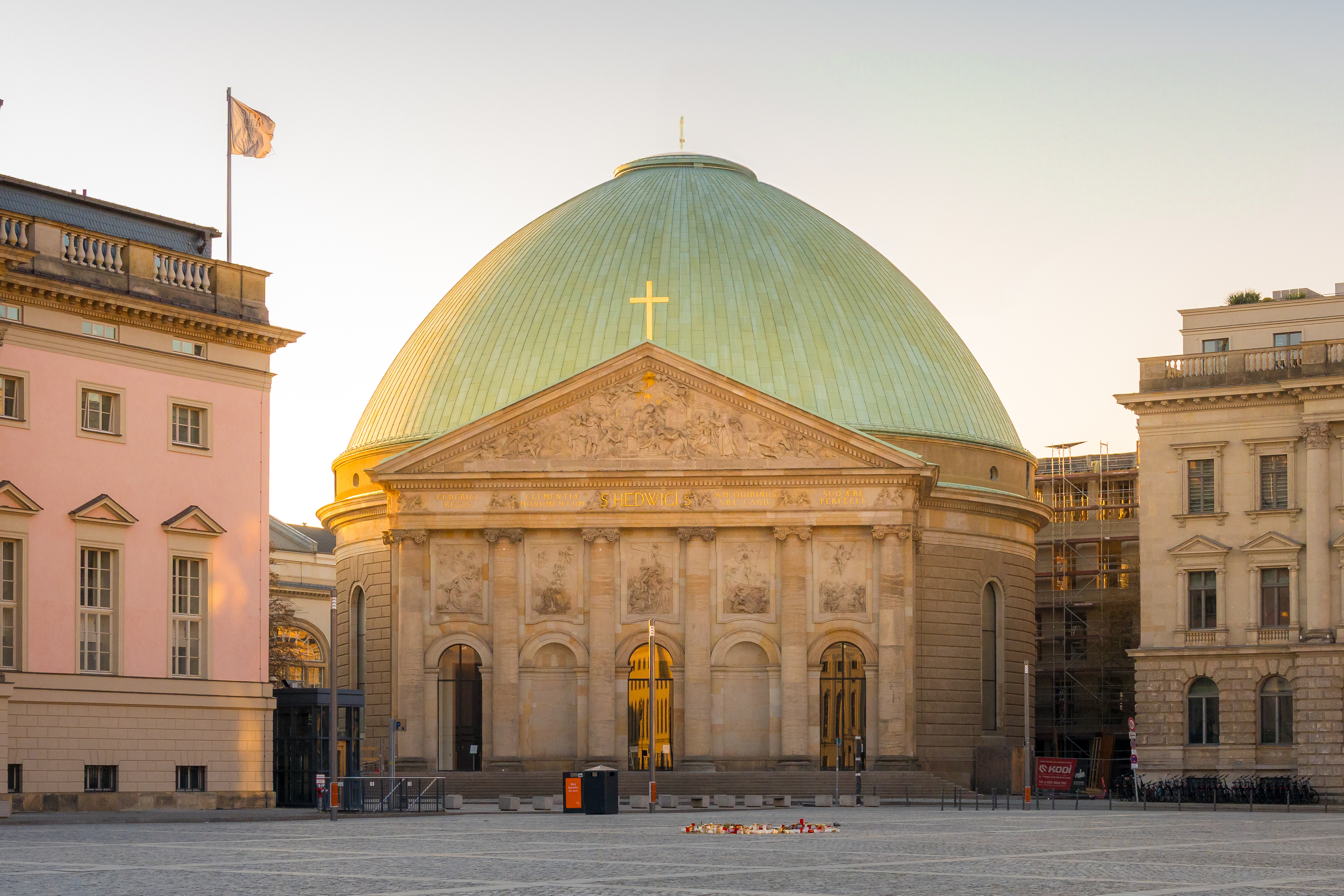
St. Hedwig's Cathedral

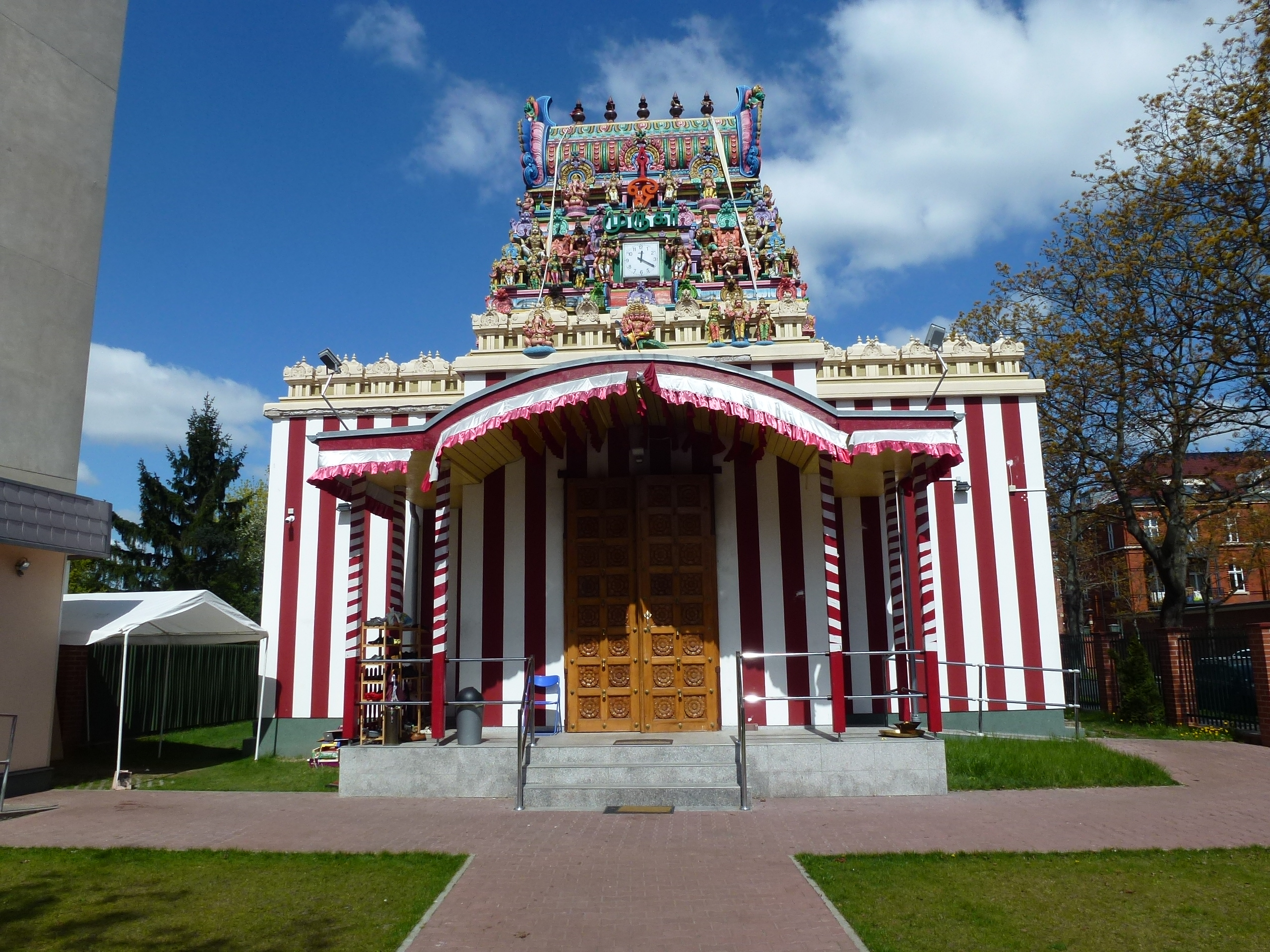
Blaschkoallee Sri-Mayurapathy-Murugan-Hindu temple

== Government and politics ==
=== City state ===
Since German reunification on 3 October 1990, Berlin has been one of the three city-states among the present 16 states of Germany. The Abgeordnetenhaus von Berlin (House of Representatives) functions as the city and state parliament, which has 141 seats. Berlin's executive body is the Senate of Berlin (Senat von Berlin). The Senate consists of the Governing Mayor of Berlin (Regierender Bürgermeister), and up to ten senators holding ministerial positions, two of them holding the title of "Mayor" (Bürgermeister) as deputy to the Governing Mayor.

The total annual budget of Berlin in 2015 exceeded €24.5 ($30) billion including a budget surplus of €205 ($240) million. The state of Berlin owns extensive assets, including administrative and government buildings, real estate companies, as well as stakes in the Olympic Stadium, swimming pools, housing companies, and numerous public enterprises and subsidiary companies. The state of Berlin runs a real estate portal to advertise commercial spaces or land suitable for redevelopment.

The Social Democratic Party (SPD) and The Left (Die Linke) took control of the city government after the 2001 state election and won another term in the 2006 state election. From the 2016 state election until the 2023 state election, there was a coalition between the Social Democratic Party, the Greens and the Left Party. Since April 2023, the government has been formed by a coalition between the Christian Democrats and the Social Democrats.

The Governing Mayor is simultaneously Lord Mayor of the City of Berlin (Oberbürgermeister der Stadt) and Minister President of the State of Berlin (Ministerpräsident des Bundeslandes). The office of the Governing Mayor is in the Red Town Hall. Since 2023, this office has been held by Kai Wegner of the Christian Democrats. He is the first conservative mayor in Berlin in more than two decades.

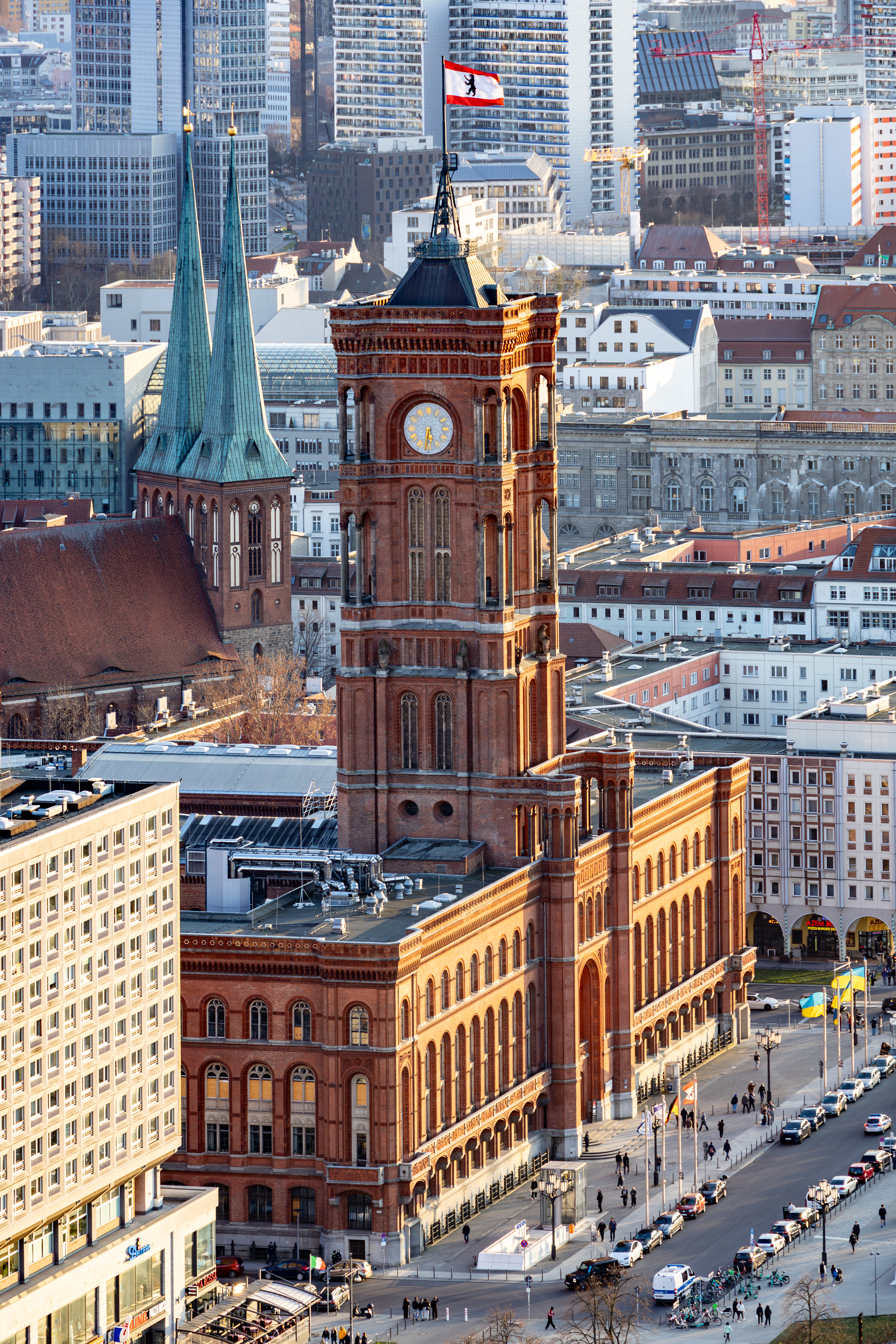
Red Town Hall

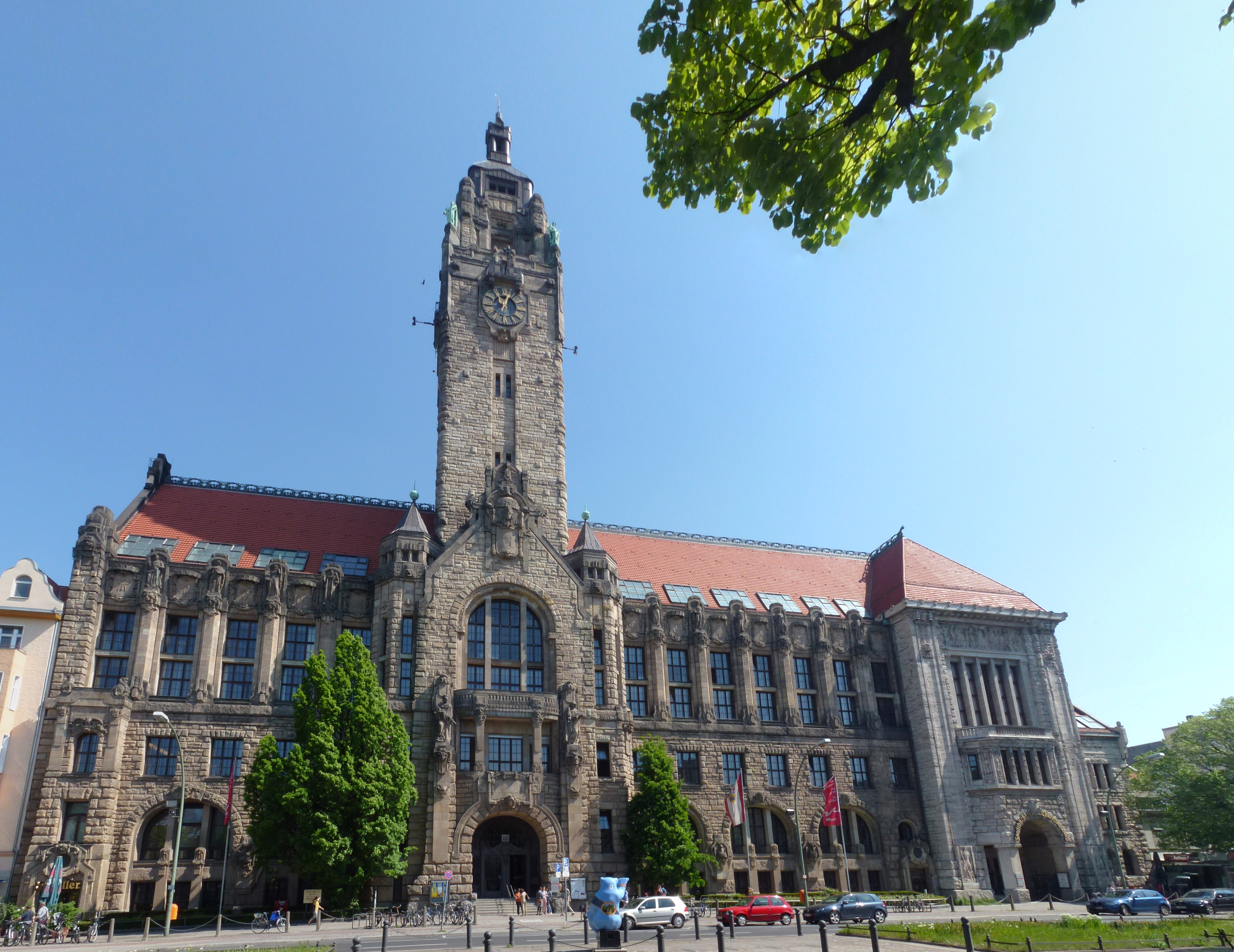
Charlottenburg Town Hall

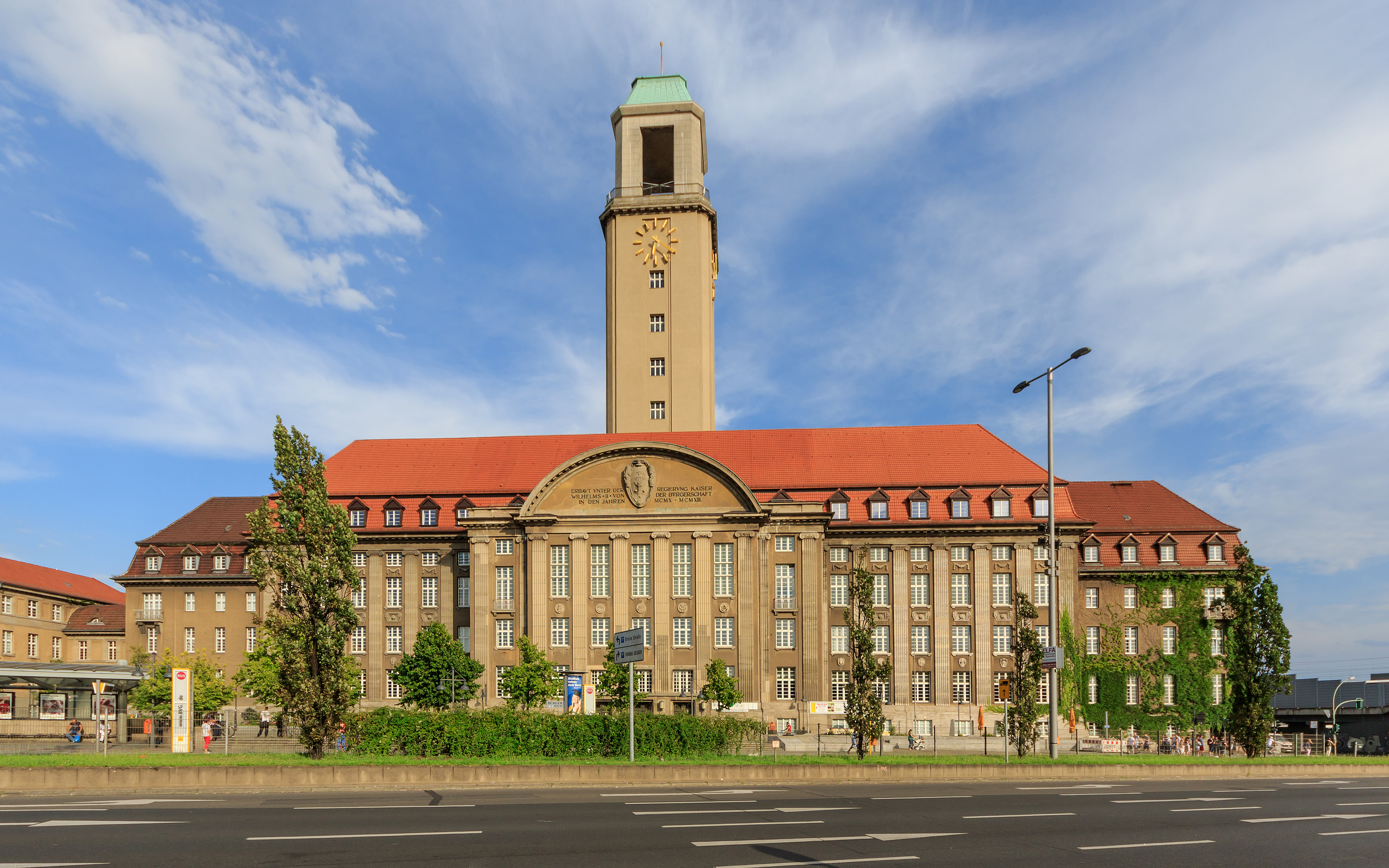
Rathaus Spandau

=== Boroughs ===
Berlin's 12 boroughs and their 96 neighborhoods

Berlin is subdivided into 12 boroughs or districts (Bezirke). Each borough has several subdistricts or neighborhoods (Ortsteile), which have roots in much older municipalities that predate the formation of Greater Berlin on 1 October 1920. These subdistricts became urbanized and incorporated into the city later on. Many residents strongly identify with their neighborhoods, colloquially called Kiez. At present, Berlin consists of 96 subdistricts, which are commonly made up of several smaller residential areas or quarters.

Each borough is governed by a borough council (Bezirksamt) consisting of five councilors (Bezirksstadträte) including the borough's mayor (Bezirksbürgermeister). The council is elected by the borough assembly (Bezirksverordnetenversammlung). However, the individual boroughs are not independent municipalities, but subordinate to the Senate of Berlin. The borough's mayors make up the council of mayors (Rat der Bürgermeister), which is led by the city's Governing Mayor and advises the Senate. The neighborhoods have no local government bodies.

=== City partnerships ===
Berlin to this day maintains official partnerships with 17 cities. Town twinning between West Berlin and other cities began with its sister city Los Angeles, California, in 1967. East Berlin's partnerships were canceled at the time of German reunification.

=== Capital city ===
Berlin is the capital of the Federal Republic of Germany. The President of Germany, whose functions are mainly ceremonial under the German constitution, has their official residence in Bellevue Palace. Berlin is the seat of the German Chancellor (Bundeskanzler), housed in the Chancellery building, the Bundeskanzleramt. Facing the Chancellery is the Bundestag, the German Parliament, housed in the renovated Reichstag building since the government's relocation to Berlin in 1998. The Bundesrat ("federal council", performing the function of an upper house) is the representation of the 16 constituent states (Länder) of Germany and has its seat at the former Prussian House of Lords. The total annual federal budget managed by the German government exceeded €310 ($375) billion in 2013 and grew to over €524 ($606) billion in 2026.

The relocation of the federal government and Bundestag to Berlin was mostly completed in 1999. However, some ministries, as well as some minor departments, stayed in the federal city Bonn, the former capital of West Germany. Discussions about moving the remaining ministries and departments to Berlin continue.

The Federal Foreign Office and the ministries and departments of Defense, Justice and Consumer Protection, Finance, Interior, Economic Affairs and Energy, Labor and Social Affairs, Family Affairs, Senior Citizens, Women and Youth, Environment, Nature Conservation and Nuclear Safety, Food and Agriculture, Economic Cooperation and Development, Health, Transport and Digital Infrastructure and Education and Research are based in the capital.

=== Embassies ===
Berlin hosts in total 158 foreign embassies as well as the headquarters of many think tanks, trade unions, nonprofit organizations, lobbying groups, and professional associations. Frequent official visits and diplomatic consultations among governmental representatives and national leaders are common in contemporary Berlin.

== Economy ==
In 2025, Berlin's GDP amounted to €218.3 billion and grew by 1.1% in real terms from the previous year. Between 2013 and 2025, Berlin's annual real GDP growth exceeded the national rate in every year, with the service sector providing the main contribution to growth. Berlin's unemployment rate declined from its peak of 18.3% in 2005 to 7.8% in 2019. It rose during the COVID-19 pandemic and, after a temporary decline in 2022, increased to an annual average of 10.3% in 2025.

Important economic sectors in Berlin include life sciences, transportation, information and communication technologies, media and music, advertising and design, biotechnology, environmental services, construction, e-commerce, retail, hotel business, and medical engineering.

Research and development have economic significance for the city. Several major corporations like Volkswagen, Pfizer, and SAP operate innovation laboratories in the city. The Science and Business Park in Adlershof is the largest technology park in Germany measured by revenue. Within the eurozone, Berlin has become a center for business relocation and international investments.

=== Companies ===
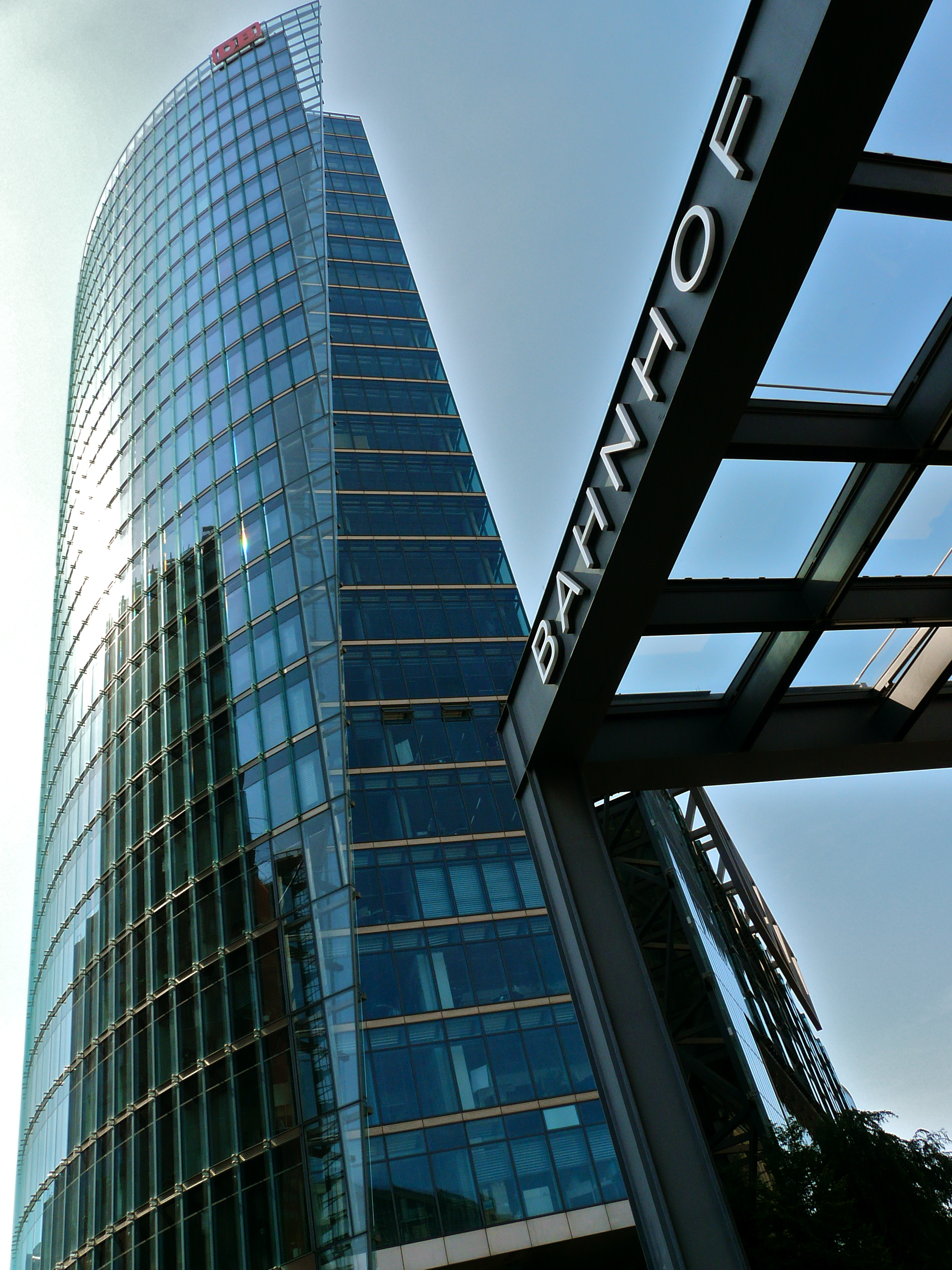
Deutsche Bahn, the largest railway company in the world, is headquartered in Berlin.

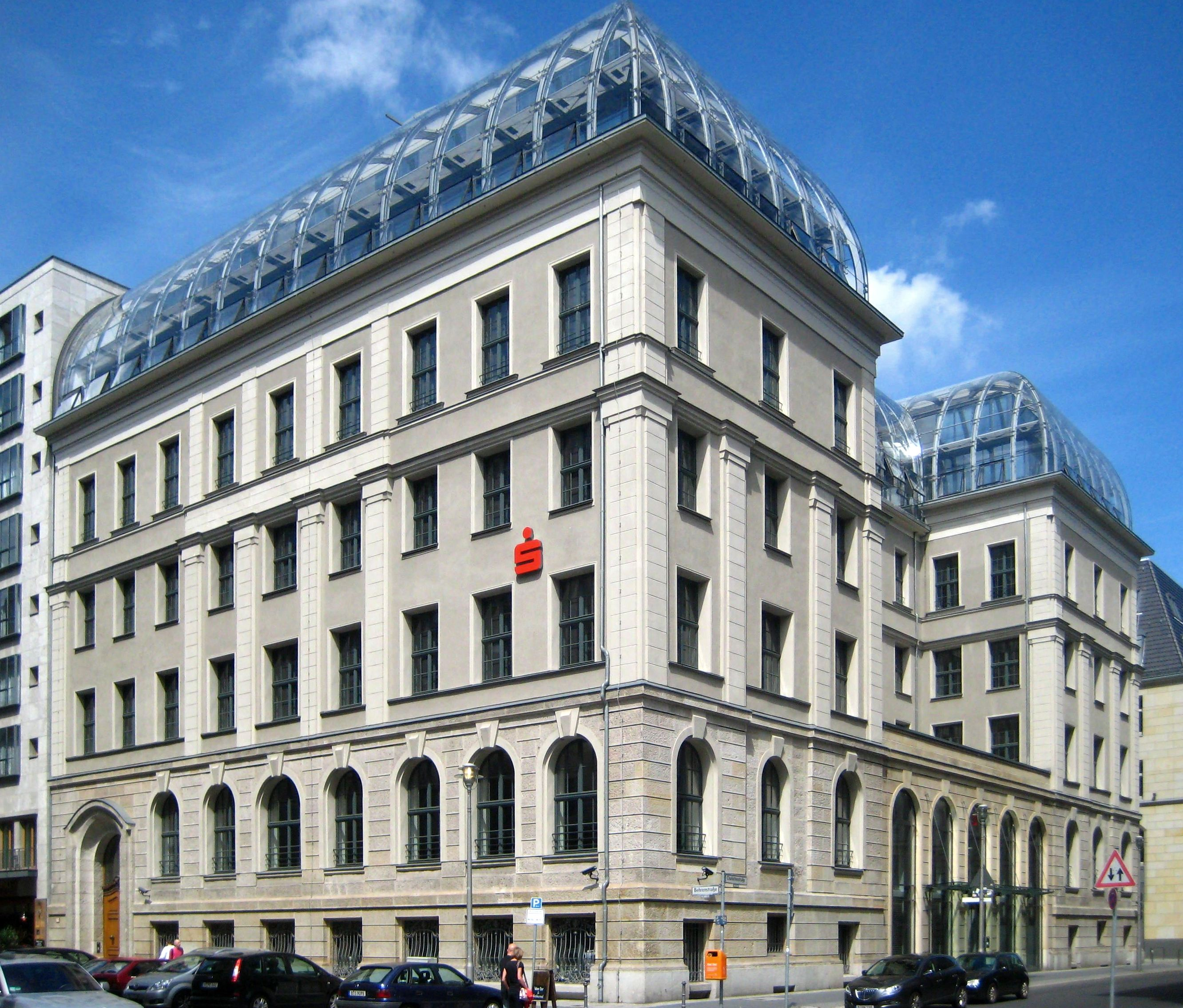
Deutscher Sparkassen- und Giroverband, the European Union's second-largest financial services group, has its headquarters in Berlin.

Many German and international companies have business or service centers in the city. For several years Berlin has been recognized as a major center of business founders. In 2015, Berlin generated the most venture capital for young startup companies in Europe.

Among the 10 largest employers in Berlin are the City-State of Berlin, Deutsche Bahn, largest railway company in the world, the hospital providers Charité and Vivantes, the Federal Government of Germany, the local public transport provider BVG, Siemens and Deutsche Telekom.

Siemens, a Global 500 and DAX-listed company is partly headquartered in Berlin. Other DAX-listed companies headquartered in Berlin are the property company Deutsche Wohnen, the online fashion retailer Zalando and the online food delivery service Delivery Hero. The national railway operator Deutsche Bahn, Europe's largest digital publisher Axel Springer as well as the MDAX-listed firm HelloFresh and also have their main headquarters in the city. Among the largest international corporations who have their German or European headquarters in Berlin are Bombardier Transportation, Securing Energy for Europe, Coca-Cola, Pfizer, Sony and TotalEnergies.

As of 2023, Sparkassen-Finanzgruppe, a network of public banks that together form the largest financial services group in Germany and in all of Europe, is headquartered in Berlin. The Bundesverband der Deutschen Volksbanken und Raiffeisenbanken has its headquarters in Berlin, managing around 1.2 trillion euros. The three largest banks in the capital are Deutsche Kreditbank, Landesbank Berlin and Berlin Hyp.

Mercedes-Benz Group manufactures cars, and BMW builds motorcycles in Berlin. In 2022, American electric car manufacturer Tesla opened its first European Gigafactory outside the city borders in Grünheide (Mark), Brandenburg. The Pharmaceuticals division of Bayer and Berlin Chemie are major pharmaceutical companies in the city.

=== Tourism and conventions ===
Berlin had 788 hotels with 134,399 beds in 2014. The city recorded 28.7 million overnight hotel stays and 11.9 million hotel guests in 2014. Tourism figures have more than doubled within the last ten years and Berlin has become the 3rd-most-visited city destination in Europe. Some of the most visited places in Berlin include: Potsdamer Platz, Brandenburger Tor, the Berlin wall, Alexanderplatz, Museumsinsel, Fernsehturm, the East-Side Gallery, Schloss-Charlottenburg, Zoologischer Garten, Siegessäule, Gedenkstätte Berliner Mauer, Mauerpark, Botanical Garden, Französischer Dom, Deutscher Dom and Holocaust-Mahnmal. The largest visitor groups are from Germany, the United Kingdom, the Netherlands, Italy, Spain and the United States.

According to figures from the International Congress and Convention Association in 2015, Berlin became the leading organizer of conferences globally, hosting 195 international meetings. Some of these congress events take place on venues such as CityCube Berlin or the Berlin Congress Center (bcc).

The Messe Berlin (also known as Berlin ExpoCenter City) is the main convention organizing company in the city. Its main exhibition area covers more than 160,000 square meters (1,722,226 sq ft). Several large-scale trade fairs like the consumer electronics trade fair IFA, where the first practical audio tape recorder and the first completely electronic television system were first introduced to the public, the ILA Berlin Air Show, the Berlin Fashion Week (including the Premium Berlin and the Panorama Berlin), the Green Week, the Fruit Logistica, the transport fair InnoTrans, the tourism fair ITB and the adult entertainment and erotic fair Venus are held annually in the city, attracting a significant number of business visitors.

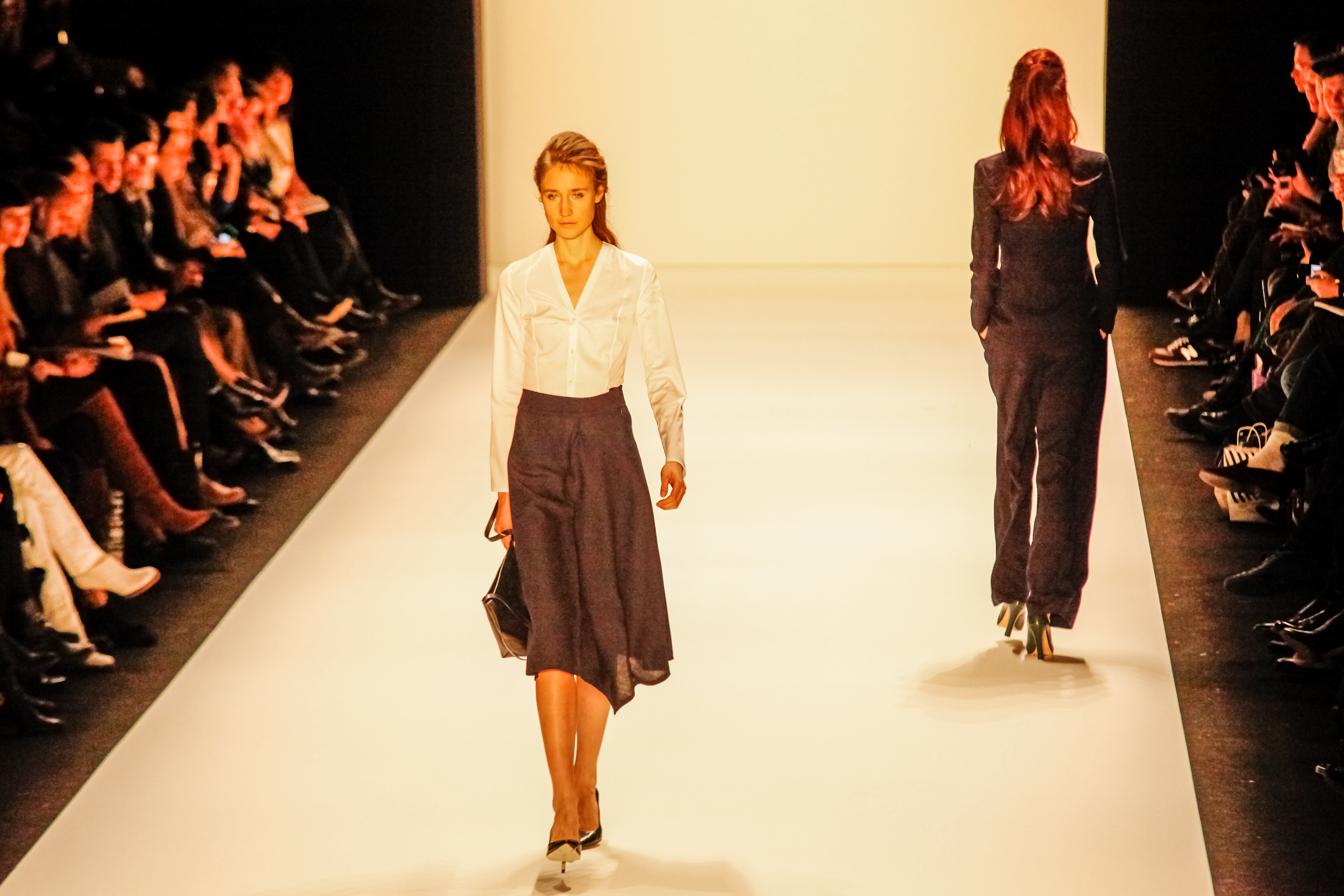
Berlin Fashion Week

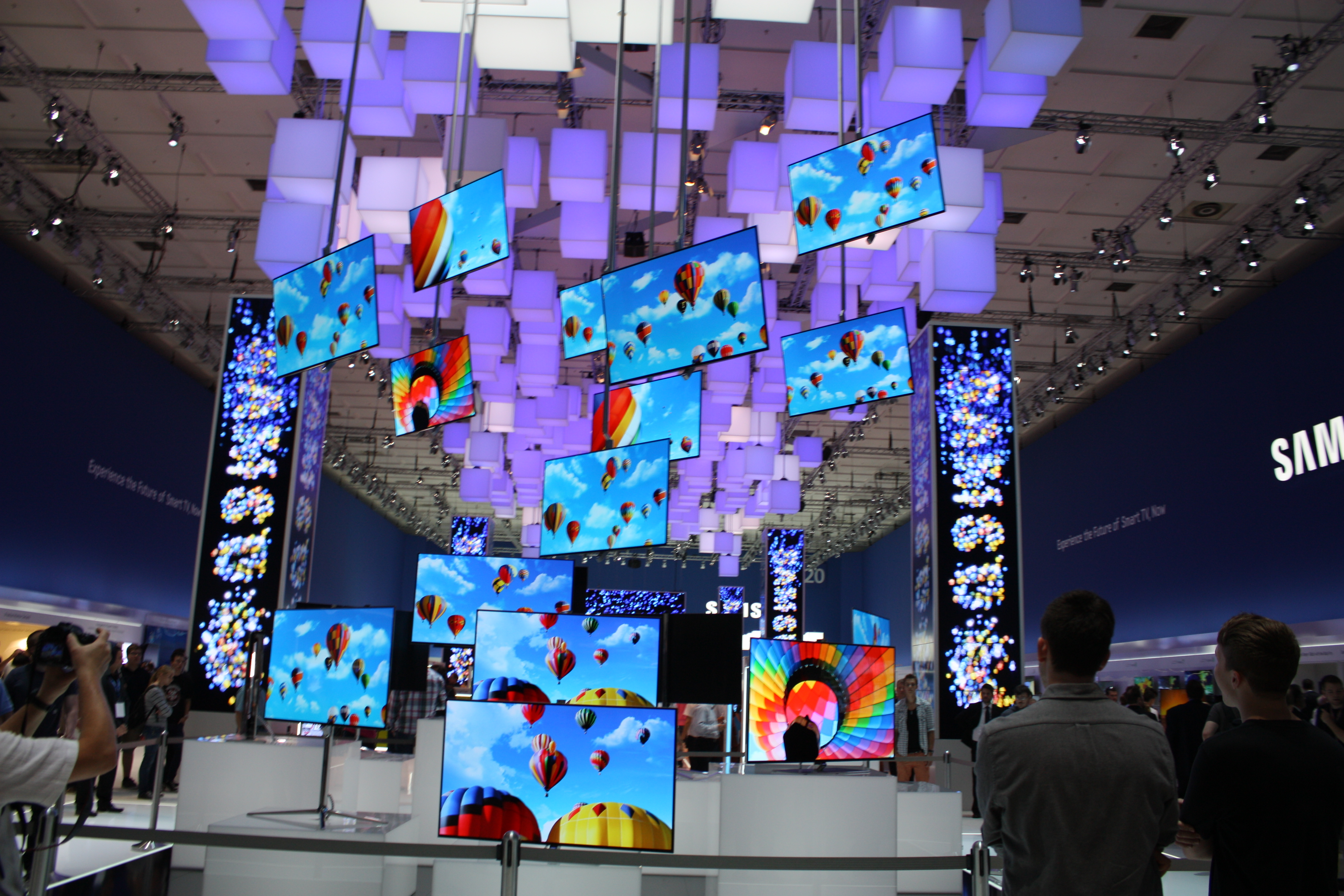
IFA is one of Europe's leading trade shows for consumer electronics.

=== Creative industries ===
The European Film Academy (logo pictured) was founded in Berlin.

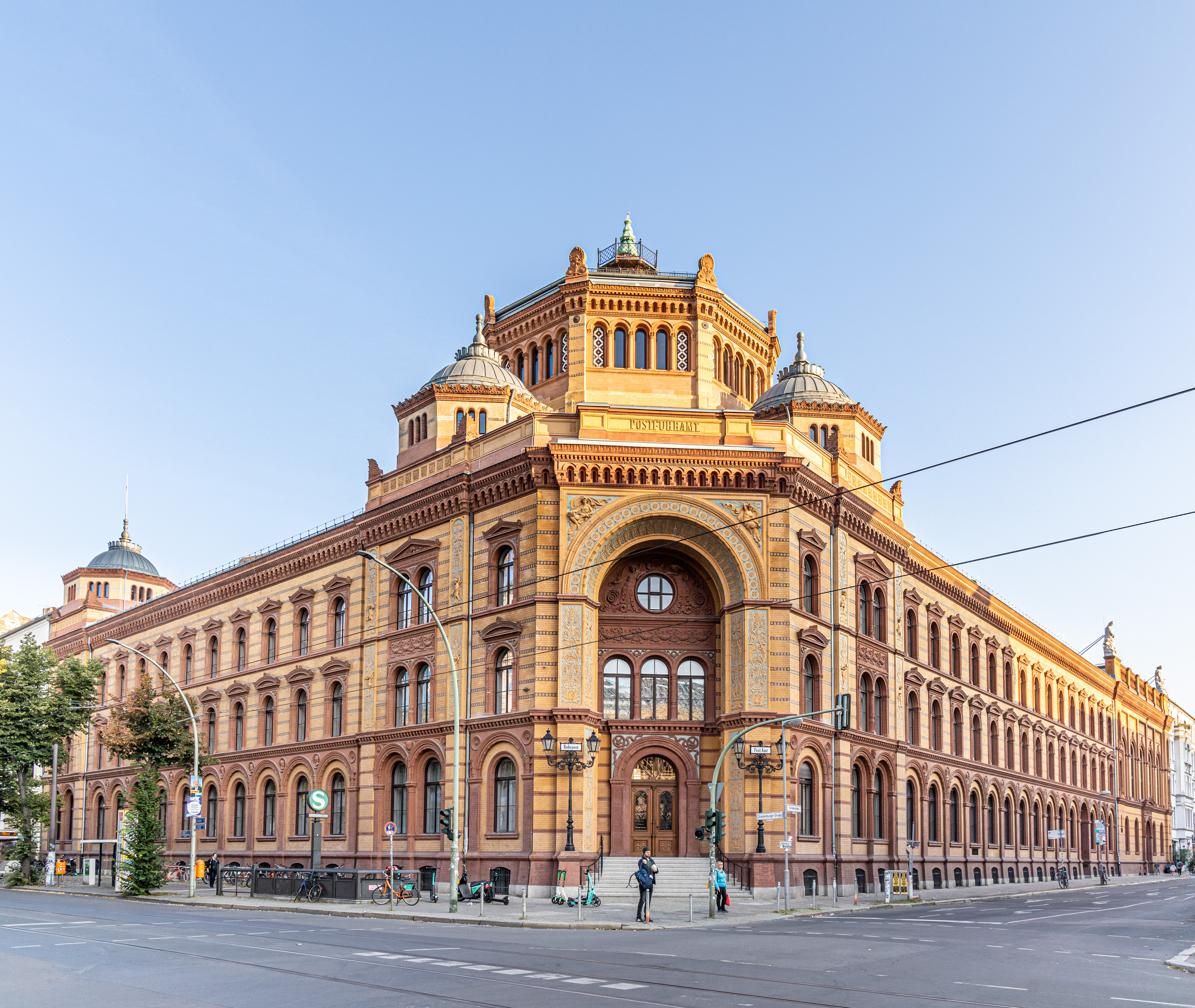
Postfuhramt in Berlin-Mitte, where Ottomar Anschütz held the first showing of life sized pictures in motion on 25 November 1894

The creative arts and entertainment business is an important part of Berlin's economy. The sector comprises music, film, advertising, architecture, art, design, fashion, performing arts, publishing, R&D, software, TV, radio, and video games.

In 2014, around 30,500 creative companies operated in the Berlin-Brandenburg metropolitan region, predominantly SMEs. Generating a revenue of 15.6 billion Euro and 6% of all private economic sales, the culture industry grew from 2009 to 2014 at an average rate of 5.5% per year.

Berlin is an important European and German film industry hub. It is home to more than 1,000 film and television production companies, 270 movie theaters, and around 300 national and international co-productions are filmed in the region every year. The historic Babelsberg Studios and the production company UFA are adjacent to Berlin in Potsdam. The city is also home of the German Film Academy (Deutsche Filmakademie), founded in 2003, and the European Film Academy, founded in 1988.

=== Media ===
Berlin is home to many magazine, newspaper, book, and scientific/academic publishers and their associated service industries. In addition, around 20 news agencies, more than 90 regional daily newspapers and their websites, as well as the Berlin offices of more than 22 national publications such as Der Spiegel, and Die Zeit reinforce the capital's position as Germany's epicenter for influential debate. Therefore, many international journalists, bloggers, and writers live and work in the city.

Berlin is the central location to several international and regional television and radio stations. The public broadcaster RBB has its headquarters in Berlin as well as the commercial broadcasters MTV Europe and Welt. German international public broadcaster Deutsche Welle has its TV production unit in Berlin, and most national German broadcasters have a studio in the city, including ZDF and RTL.

Berlin has Germany's largest number of daily newspapers, with numerous local broadsheets (Berliner Morgenpost, Berliner Zeitung, Der Tagesspiegel), and three major tabloids, as well as national dailies of varying sizes, each with a different political affiliation, such as Die Welt, Neues Deutschland, and Die Tageszeitung. The Berliner, a monthly magazine, is Berlin's English-language periodical and La Gazette de Berlin a French-language newspaper.

Berlin is also home to several major German-language publishing houses, including Walter de Gruyter, Springer, Suhrkamp, and Cornelsen.

== Quality of life ==
In a 2023 European Commission survey, 86% of respondents in Berlin were satisfied with the city as a place to live. The survey also found that 83% were satisfied with their personal job situation.

In the 2025 Global Power City Index, Berlin ranked fourth in the livability category among 48 cities. The category covers working conditions, the cost of living, safety, health and well-being, and access to everyday services and amenities.

Berlin's 2025 Social Report, which covers developments through 2023, found that around 20% of residents were at risk of poverty. It also found that a similar share of households spent at least 40% of their income on rent and associated charges.

== Transport ==
=== Airports ===
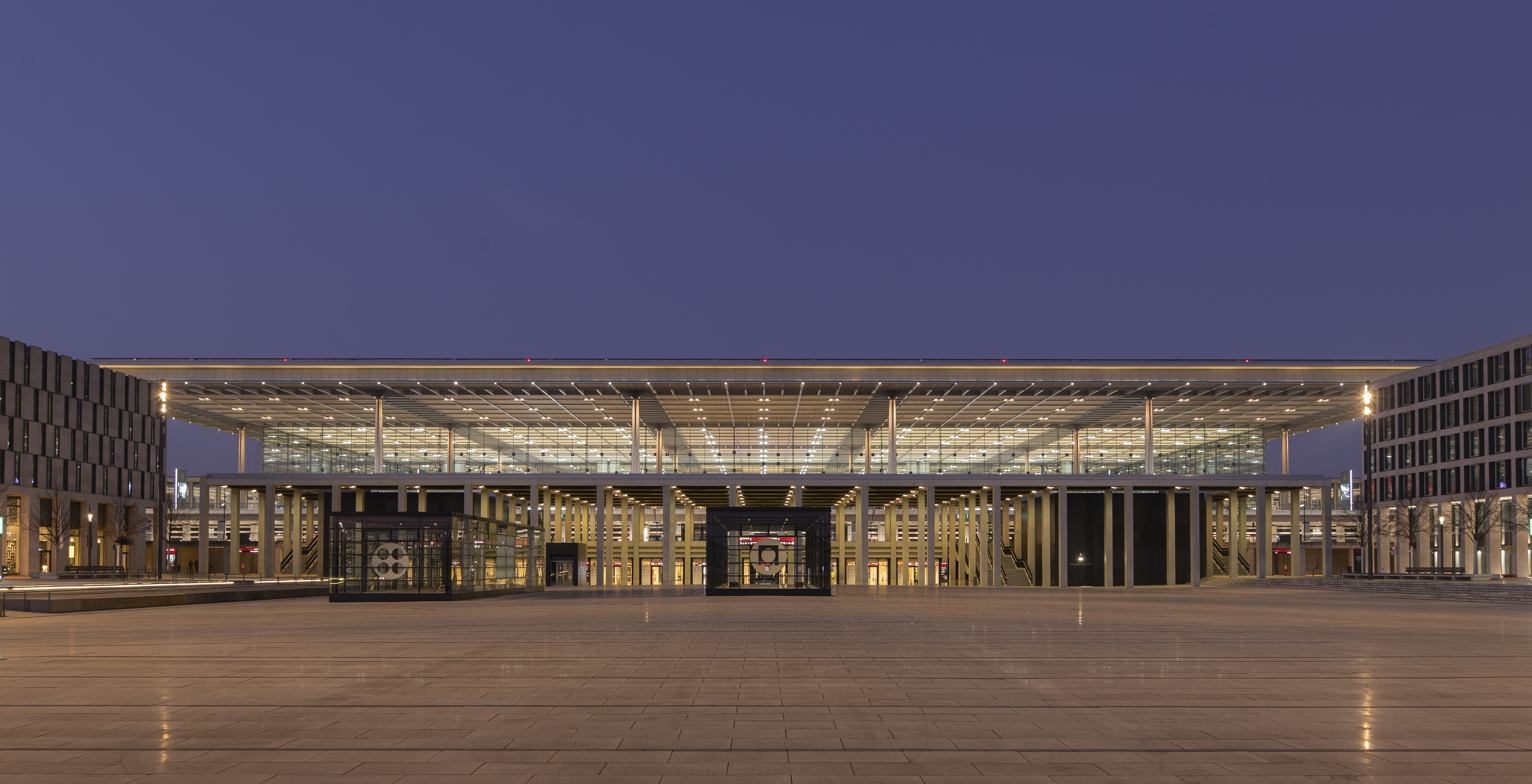
Berlin Brandenburg Airport (BER) at night

Berlin is served by Berlin Brandenburg Airport (BER), an international airport in Schönefeld, Brandenburg, located just outside Berlin's south-eastern border. Construction began in 2006, and the airport opened in October 2020 after extensive delays and cost overruns, consolidating commercial air traffic from Tegel Airport and Schönefeld Airport at a single site.

In 2025, BER handled 26.1 million passengers and was Germany's third-busiest airport. The airport can be further expanded to accommodate up to 55 million passengers annually by 2040. BER Airport station, located beneath Terminal 1, is served by the Berlin S-Bahn, regional and long-distance trains, and the Airport Express (FEX). Since December 2025, the FEX has connected the airport with Berlin Hauptbahnhof in approximately 23 minutes.

Until its closure in 2008, Berlin was also served by Tempelhof Airport. Its former airfield opened as the public park Tempelhofer Feld in 2010.

=== Roads ===
Berlin's transport infrastructure provides a diverse range of urban mobility.

A total of 979 bridges cross 197 km (122 miles) the inner-city waterways. Berlin roads total 5,422 km (3,369 miles) of which 77 km (48 miles) are motorways (known as Autobahn). In 2013 only 1.344 million motor vehicles were registered in the city. With 377 cars per 1000 residents in 2013 (570/1000 in Germany), Berlin as a Western global city has one of the lowest numbers of cars per capita.

=== Rail ===
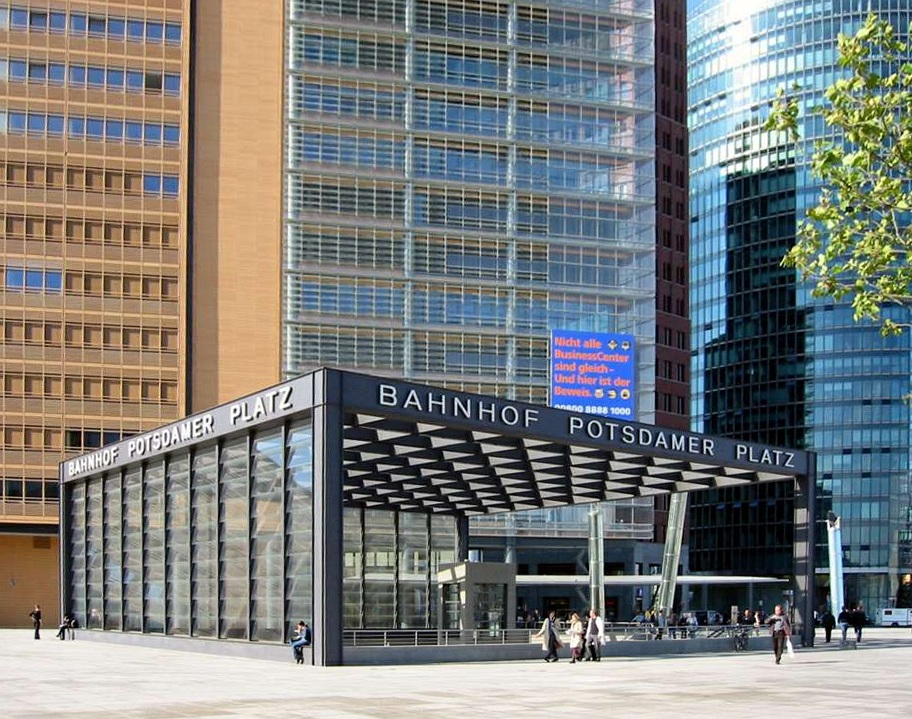
DB Station Potsdamer Platz

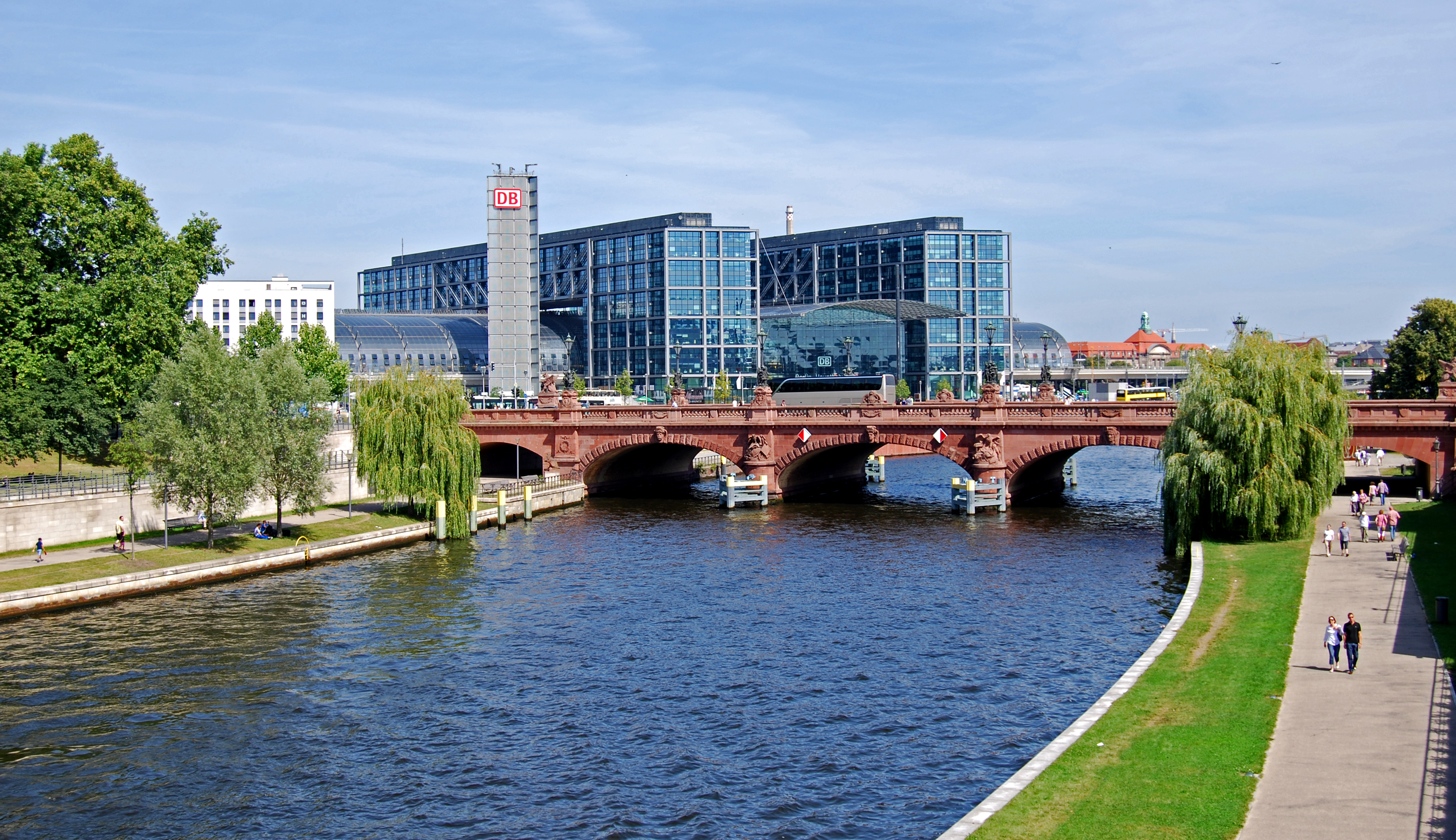
Berlin Hauptbahnhof (Berlin Central Station)

Long-distance rail lines directly connect Berlin with all of the major cities of Germany. The regional rail lines of the Verkehrsverbund Berlin-Brandenburg provide access to Brandenburg and to the Baltic Sea. The Berlin Hauptbahnhof (Berlin Central Station) is the largest grade-separated railway station in Europe. The Deutsche Bahn runs the high speed Intercity-Express (ICE) to domestic destinations, including Hamburg, Munich, Cologne, Stuttgart, and Frankfurt am Main.

=== Water transport ===
The Spree and the Havel rivers cross Berlin. There are no frequent passenger connections to and from Berlin by water. Berlin's largest inland port, the Westhafen, is located in the district of Moabit. It is a transhipment and storage site for inland shipping with a growing importance.

=== Intercity buses ===
There is an increasing quantity of intercity bus services. Berlin city has more than 10 stations that run buses to destinations throughout Berlin. Destinations in Germany and Europe are connected via the intercity bus exchange Zentraler Omnibusbahnhof Berlin.

=== Urban public transport ===
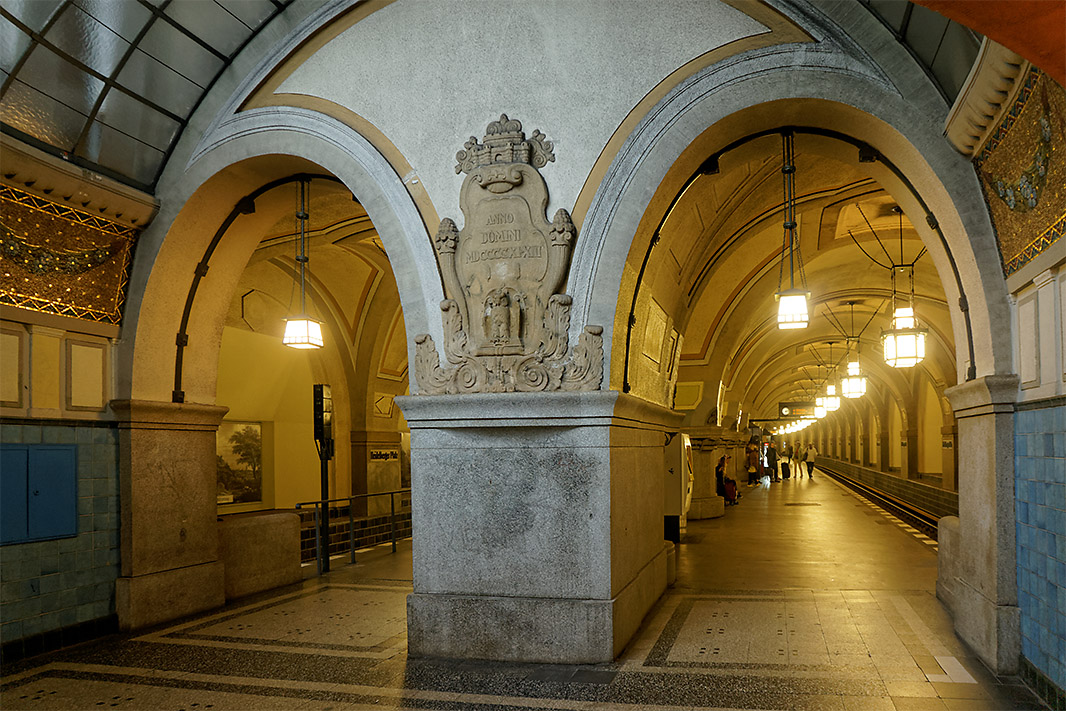
The Berlin U-Bahn (Metro) at Heidelberger Platz station

The Berliner Verkehrsbetriebe (BVG) and the German State-owned Deutsche Bahn (DB) manage several extensive urban public transport systems.

| System | Stations / Lines / Net length | Annual ridership | Operator / Notes |
|---|---|---|---|
| S-Bahn | 166 / 16 / 331 km (206 mi) | 431,000,000 (2016) | DB / Mainly overground rapid transit rail system with suburban stops |
| U-Bahn | 173 / 9 / 146 km (91 mi) | 563,000,000 (2017) | BVG / Mainly underground rail system / 24h-service on weekends |
| Tram | 404 / 22 / 194 km (121 mi) | 197,000,000 (2017) | BVG / Operates predominantly in eastern boroughs |
| Bus | 3227 / 198 / 1,675 km (1,041 mi) | 440,000,000 (2017) | BVG / Extensive services in all boroughs / 62 Night Lines |
| Ferry | 6 lines | | BVG / Transportation as well as recreational ferries |

Public transport in Berlin has a long and complicated history because of the 20th-century division of the city, where movement between the two halves was not served. Since 1989, the transport network has been developed extensively. However, it still contains early 20th century trains, such as the U1.

=== Cycling ===
Berlin is well known for its highly developed bicycle lane system. It is estimated that Berlin has 710 bicycles per 1,000 residents. Around 500,000 daily bike riders accounted for 13% of total traffic in 2010.

Cyclists in Berlin have access to 620 km of bicycle paths including approximately 150 km of mandatory bicycle paths, 190 km of off-road bicycle routes, 60 km of bicycle lanes on roads, 70 km of shared bus lanes which are also open to cyclists, 100 km of combined pedestrian/bike paths and 50 km of marked bicycle lanes on roadside pavements or sidewalks. Riders are allowed to carry their bicycles on Regionalbahn (RE), S-Bahn and U-Bahn trains, on trams, and on night buses if a bike ticket is purchased.

=== Taxicabs ===
Taxicabs in Berlin are yellow or beige. In 2024, around 8,000 taxicabs were in service. Like in most of Europe, app-based sharing cab services are available but limited.

== Energy ==
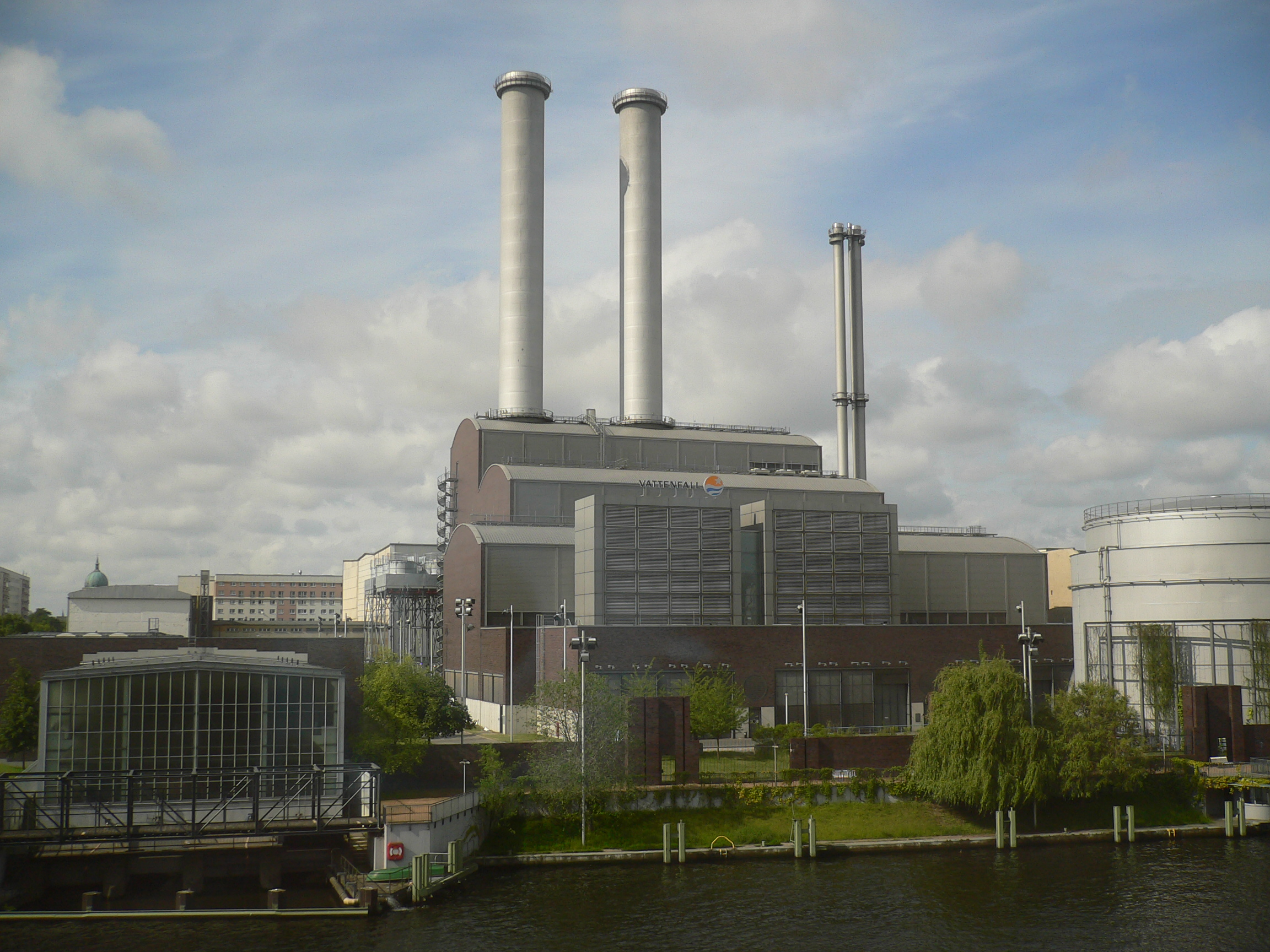
Heizkraftwerk Mitte power plant

Most of the electricity generated in Berlin comes from combined heat and power (CHP) plants, which also supply the city's district heating networks. Berlin is a net importer of electricity and draws power from neighboring Brandenburg, particularly during summer, when local CHP plants operate at reduced output.

The Berlin 380-kV electric line, which crosses the city from Spandau to Marzahn, forms a central part of the city's transmission network. Its connection to the regional grid in 1994 ended West Berlin's operation as a power island.

BEW Berliner Energie und Wärme, owned by the state of Berlin since 2024, operates several major CHP plants and the city's largest district heating network, which supplies about one third of Berlin's households. Its largest plants are the coal-fired Reuter West power station and the natural gas-fired Berlin-Mitte power station.

Electricity generation from renewable sources in the city is growing, driven particularly by photovoltaics. By the end of 2025, Berlin had 55,861 photovoltaic installations with a combined capacity of 487 MWp. Their estimated annual generation was about 438 GWh, equivalent to approximately 6% of Berlin’s gross electricity generation.

Berlin's climate legislation requires the Senate to work toward a phase-out of hard coal by 2030.

== Health ==
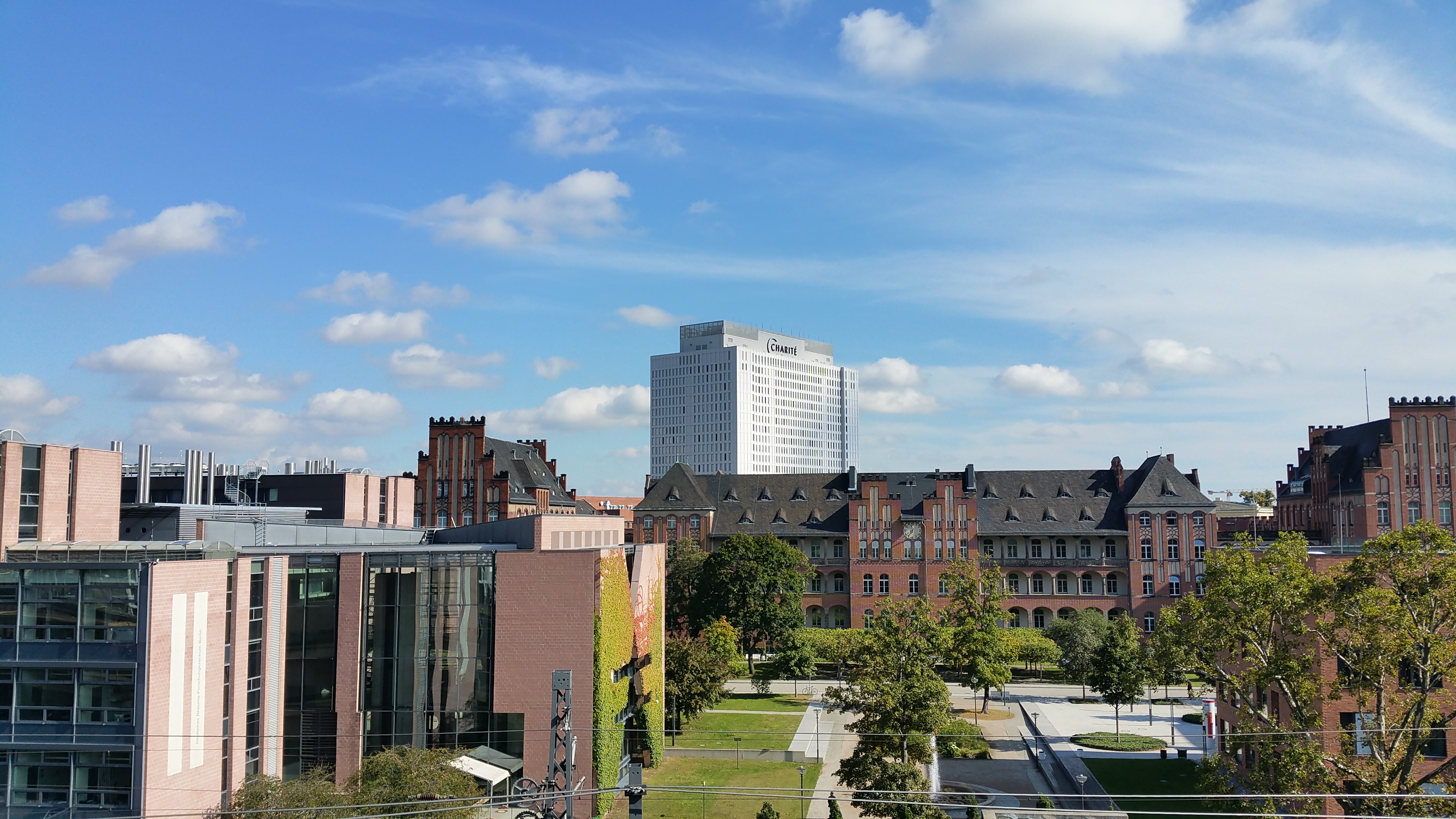
Charité, Europe's largest university hospital

Berlin has a long history of discoveries in medicine and innovations in medical technology. The modern history of medicine has been significantly influenced by scientists from Berlin. Rudolf Virchow was the founder of cellular pathology, while Robert Koch developed vaccines for anthrax, cholera, and tuberculosis. For his life's work Koch is seen as one of the founders of modern medicine.

The Charité complex (Universitätsklinik Charité) is the largest university hospital in Europe, tracing back its origins to the year 1710. More than half of all German Nobel Prize winners in Physiology or Medicine, including Emil von Behring, Robert Koch and Paul Ehrlich, have worked at the Charité. The Charité is spread over four campuses and comprises around 3,000 beds, 15,500 staff, 8,000 students, and more than 60 operating theaters, and it has a turnover of two billion euros annually.

== Education and research ==
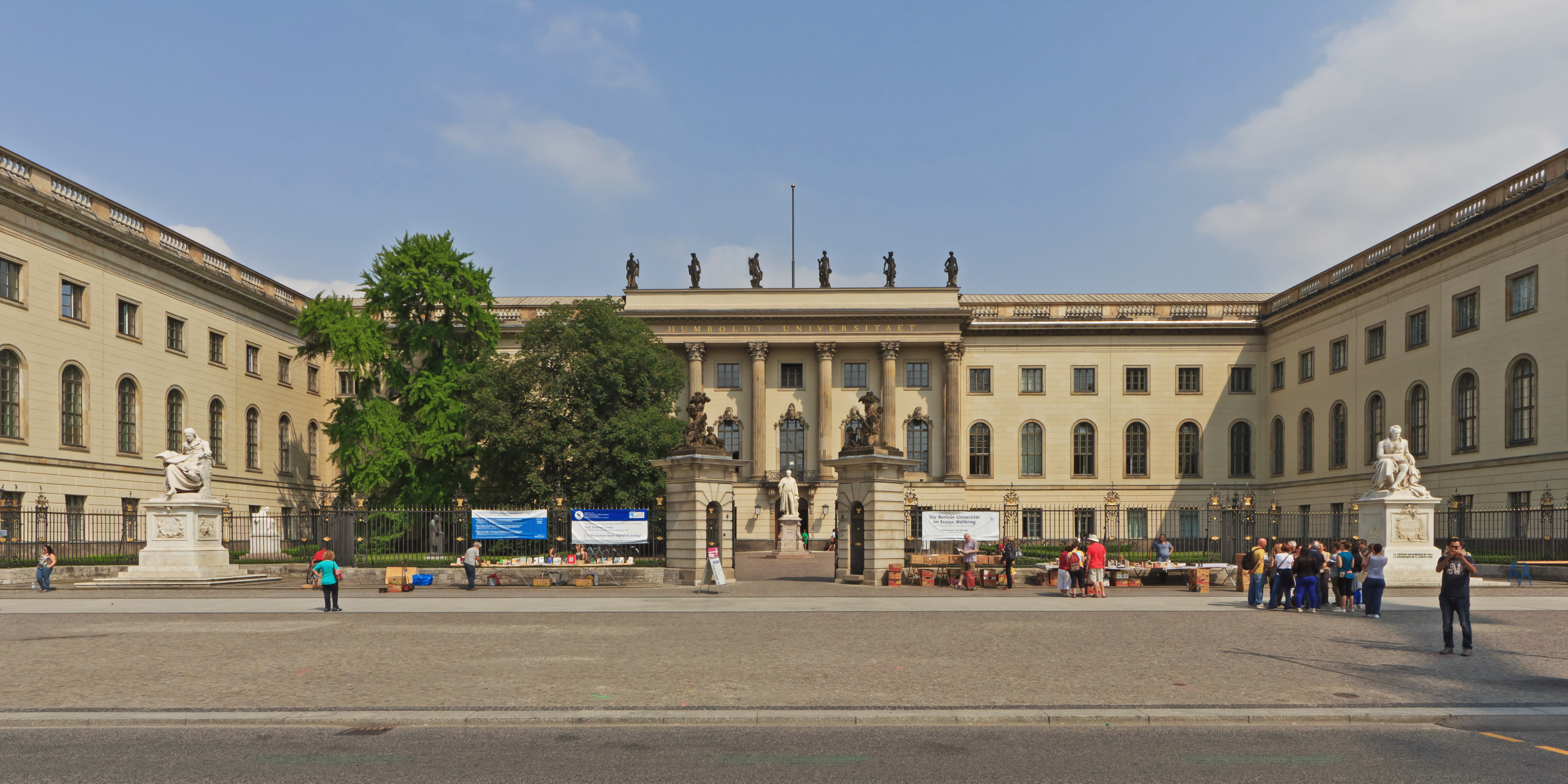
The Humboldt University of Berlin, the world's first modern university, is affiliated with 57 Nobel Prize winners.

As of 2014, Berlin had 878 schools, teaching 340,658 students in 13,727 classes and 56,787 trainees in businesses and elsewhere. The city has a 6-year primary education program. After completing primary school, students continue to the Sekundarschule (a comprehensive school) or Gymnasium (college preparatory school). Berlin has a special bilingual school program in the Europaschule, in which children are taught the curriculum in German and a foreign language, starting in primary school and continuing in high school.

The Französisches Gymnasium Berlin, which was founded in 1689 to teach the children of Huguenot refugees, offers (German/French) instruction. The John F. Kennedy School, a bilingual German–American public school in Zehlendorf, is particularly popular with children of diplomats and the English-speaking expatriate community. 82 Gymnasien teach Latin and 8 teach Classical Greek.

=== Higher education ===
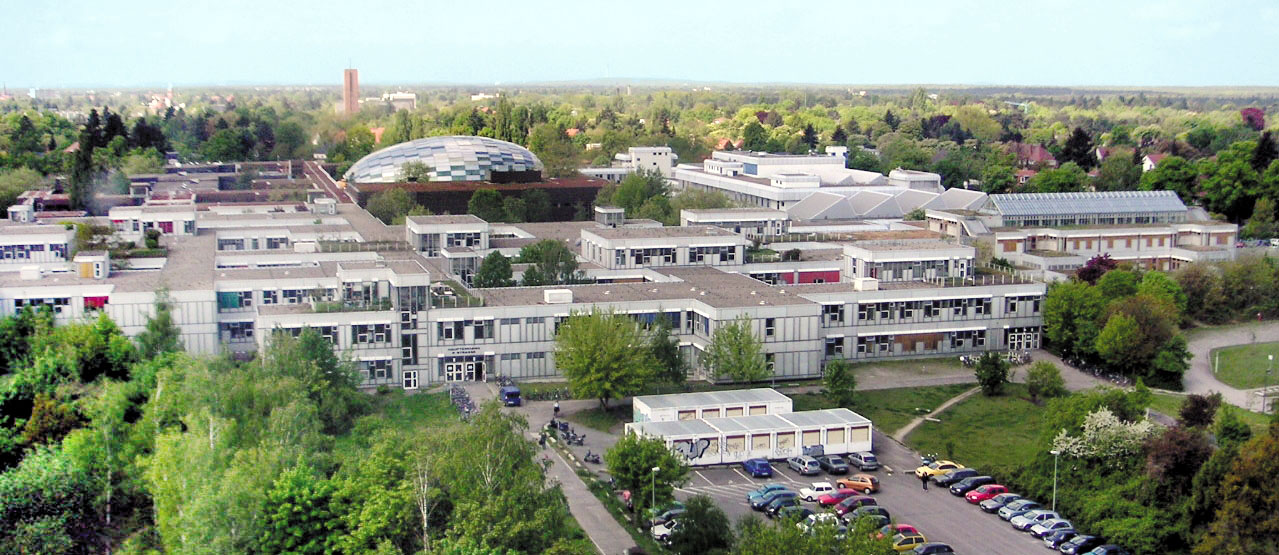
The Free University of Berlin

The Berlin-Brandenburg capital region is one of the most prolific centers of higher education and research in Germany and Europe. Historically, 67 Nobel Prize winners are affiliated with the Berlin-based universities.

The city has four public research universities and more than 30 private, professional, and technical colleges (Hochschulen), offering a wide range of disciplines. A record number of 175,651 students were enrolled in the winter term of 2015/16. Among them around 18% have an international background.

The three largest universities combined have approximately 103,000 enrolled students. There are the Freie Universität Berlin (Free University of Berlin, FU Berlin) with about 33,000 students, the Humboldt Universität zu Berlin (HU Berlin) with 35,000 students, and Technische Universität Berlin (TU Berlin) with 35,000 students. The Charité Medical School has around 8,000 students. The FU, the HU, the TU, and the Charité make up the Berlin University Alliance, which has received funding from the Excellence Strategy program of the German government. The Universität der Künste (UdK) has about 4,000 students and ESMT Berlin is only one of four business schools in Germany with triple accreditation. The Hertie School, a private public policy school located in Mitte, has more than 900 students and doctoral students. The Berlin School of Economics and Law has an enrollment of about 11,000 students, the Berlin University of Applied Sciences and Technology of about 12,000 students, and the Hochschule für Technik und Wirtschaft (University of Applied Sciences for Engineering and Economics) of about 14,000 students.

=== Research ===
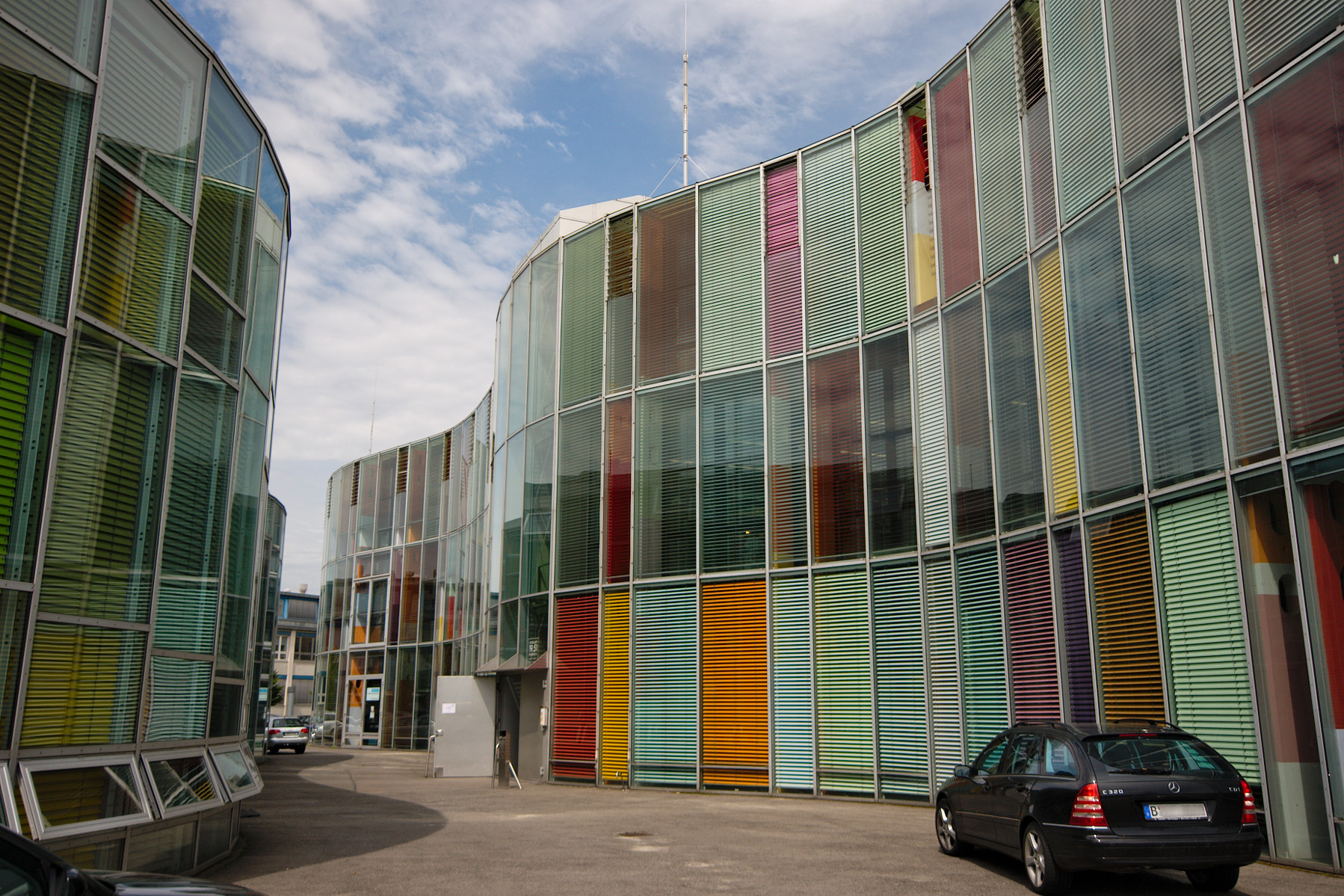
The WISTA Science and Technology Park in Adlershof

The city has a high density of internationally renowned research institutions, such as the Fraunhofer Society, the DLR Institute for Planetary Research, the Leibniz Association, the Helmholtz Association, and the Max Planck Society, which are independent of, or only loosely connected to its universities. In 2012, around 65,000 professional scientists were working in research and development in the city.

Berlin is one of the knowledge and innovation communities (KIC) of the European Institute of Innovation and Technology (EIT). The KIC is based at the Center for Entrepreneurship at TU Berlin and has a focus in the development of IT industries. It partners with major multinational companies such as Siemens, Deutsche Telekom, and SAP.

One of Europe's successful research, business and technology clusters is based at WISTA in Berlin-Adlershof, with more than 1,000 affiliated firms, university departments and scientific institutions.

In addition to the university-affiliated libraries, the Staatsbibliothek zu Berlin is a major research library. Its two main locations are on Potsdamer Straße and on Unter den Linden. There are also 86 public libraries in the city. ResearchGate, a global social networking site for scientists, is based in Berlin.

== Culture ==
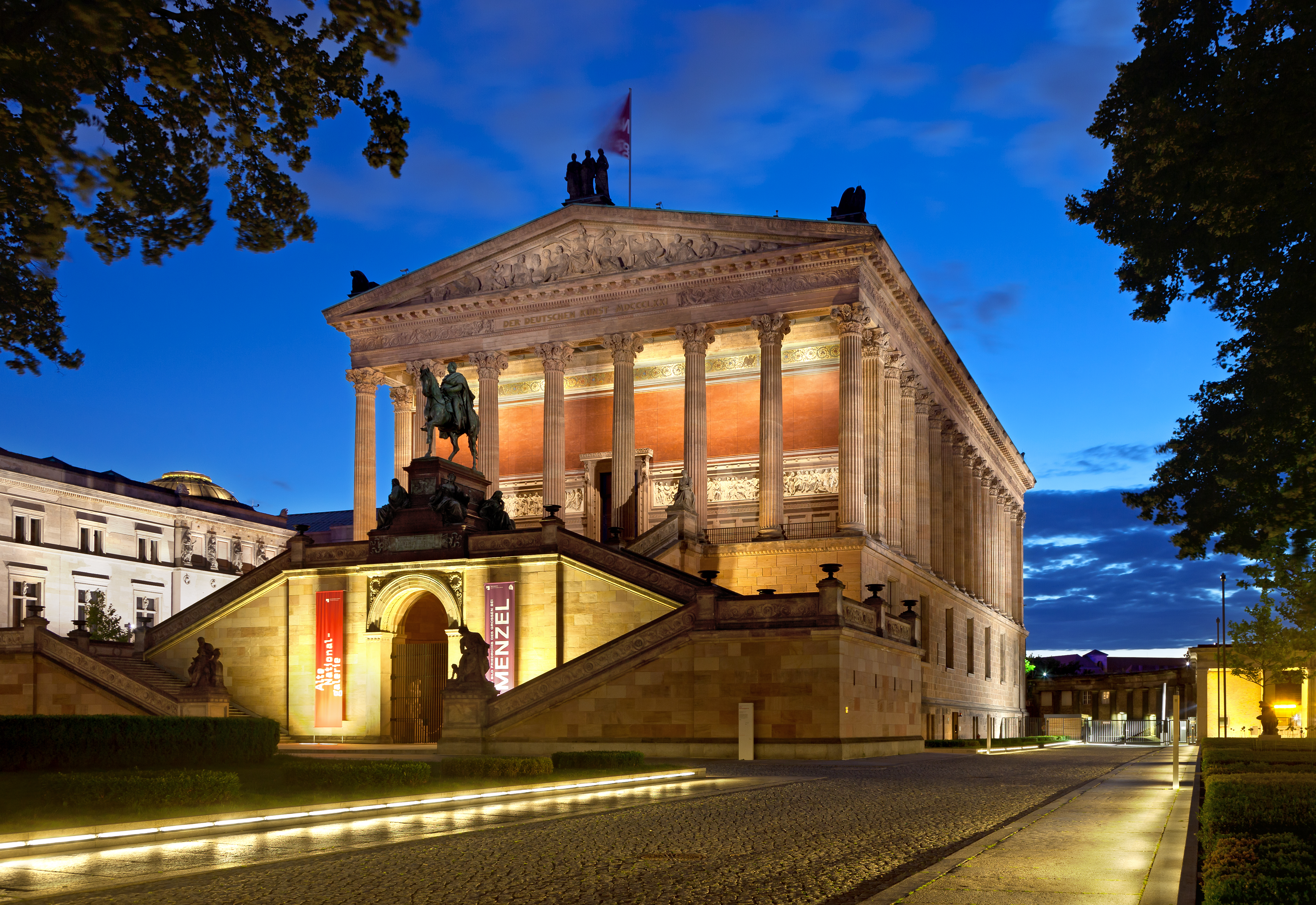
The Alte Nationalgalerie is part of the Museum Island, a UNESCO World Heritage Site.

Berlin is known for its numerous cultural institutions, many of which enjoy international reputation. The diversity and vivacity of the metropolis led to a trendsetting atmosphere. An innovative music, dance and art scene has developed in the 21st century.

Young people, international artists and entrepreneurs continued to settle in the city and made Berlin a popular entertainment center in the world.

The expanding cultural performance of the city was underscored by the relocation of the Universal Music Group who decided to move their headquarters to the banks of the River Spree. In 2005, Berlin was named "City of Design" by UNESCO and has been part of the Creative Cities Network ever since.

=== Galleries and museums ===
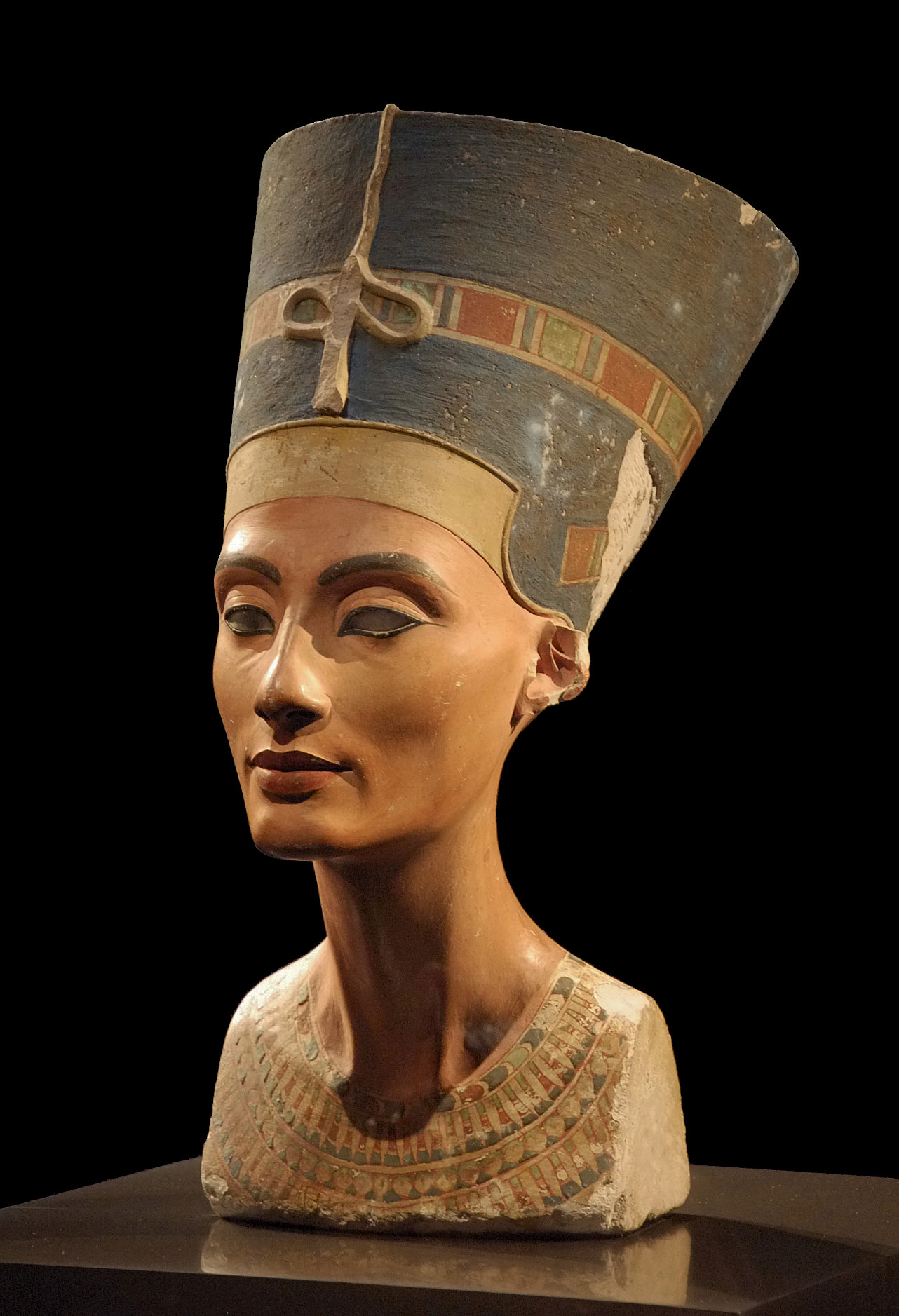
Thutmose, Bust of Nefertiti, Egyptian Museum of Berlin

As of 2011 Berlin is home to 138 museums and more than 400 art galleries. The ensemble on the Museum Island is a UNESCO World Heritage Site and is in the northern part of the Spree Island between the Spree and the Kupfergraben. As early as 1841 it was designated a "district dedicated to art and antiquities" by a royal decree. Subsequently, the Altes Museum was built in the Lustgarten. The Neues Museum, which displays the bust of Queen Nefertiti, Alte Nationalgalerie, Pergamon Museum, and Bode Museum were built there.

Apart from the Museum Island, there are many additional museums in the city. The Gemäldegalerie (Painting Gallery) focuses on the paintings of the "old masters" from the 13th to the 18th centuries, while the Neue Nationalgalerie (New National Gallery, built by Ludwig Mies van der Rohe) specializes in 20th-century European painting. The Hamburger Bahnhof, in Moabit, exhibits a major collection of modern and contemporary art. The expanded Deutsches Historisches Museum reopened in the Zeughaus with an overview of German history spanning more than a millennium. The Bauhaus Archive is a museum of 20th-century design from the famous Bauhaus school. Museum Berggruen houses the collection of noted 20th century collector Heinz Berggruen, and features an extensive assortment of works by Picasso, Matisse, Cézanne, and Giacometti, among others. The Kupferstichkabinett Berlin (Museum of Prints and Drawings) is part of the Staatlichen Museen zu Berlin (Berlin State Museums) and the Kulturforum at Potsdamer Platz in the Tiergarten district of Berlin's Mitte district. It is the largest museum of the graphic arts in Germany and at the same time one of the four most important collections of its kind in the world. The collection includes Friedrich Gilly's design for the monument to Frederick II of Prussia.

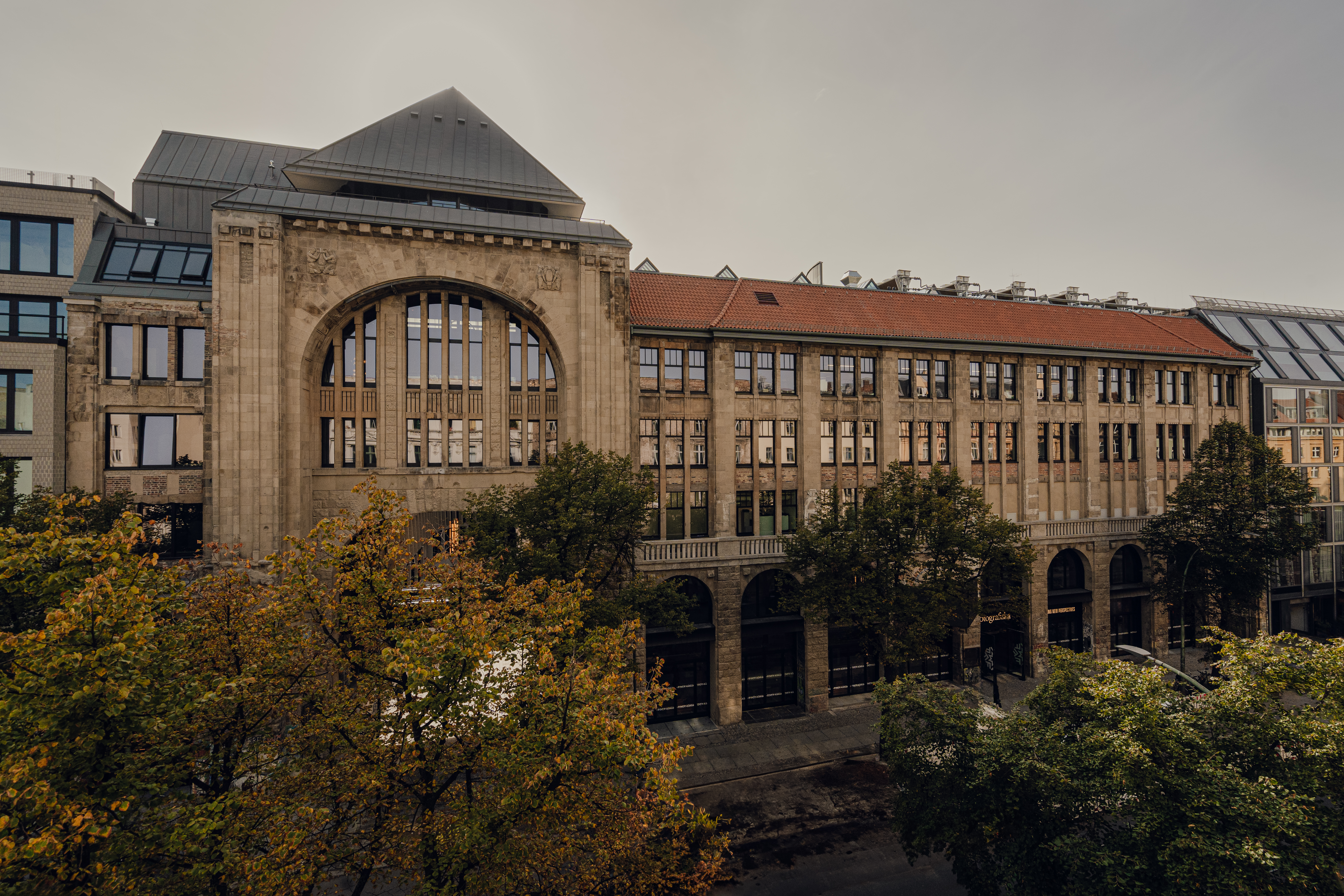
Exterior of Fotografiska Berlin on Oranienburger Str.

Berlin hosts several major institutions dedicated to photography, reflecting the city's historical and contemporary engagement with the medium. The Museum für Fotografie, part of the Staatliche Museen zu Berlin and home to the Helmut Newton Foundation, presents historical and contemporary photographic works alongside the permanent exhibition Helmut Newton's Private Property. Fotografiska Berlin, opened in 2023 in the Kunsthaus Tacheles, focuses on modern and contemporary photography through showcasing local and international photographers alongside public programming. C/O Berlin, located in the Amerika Haus near Zoologischer Garten, is a leading exhibition space for photography and visual media, known for showcasing both established and emerging photographers. Photography also plays a significant role within broader institutions such as the Berlinische Galerie, which integrates photography into its presentation of modern art, and the Kunstbibliothek Berlin, which holds an extensive photographic archive. Additional venues such as the Friedrichshain Photo Gallery contribute to the city's documentary and socially engaged photographic culture.

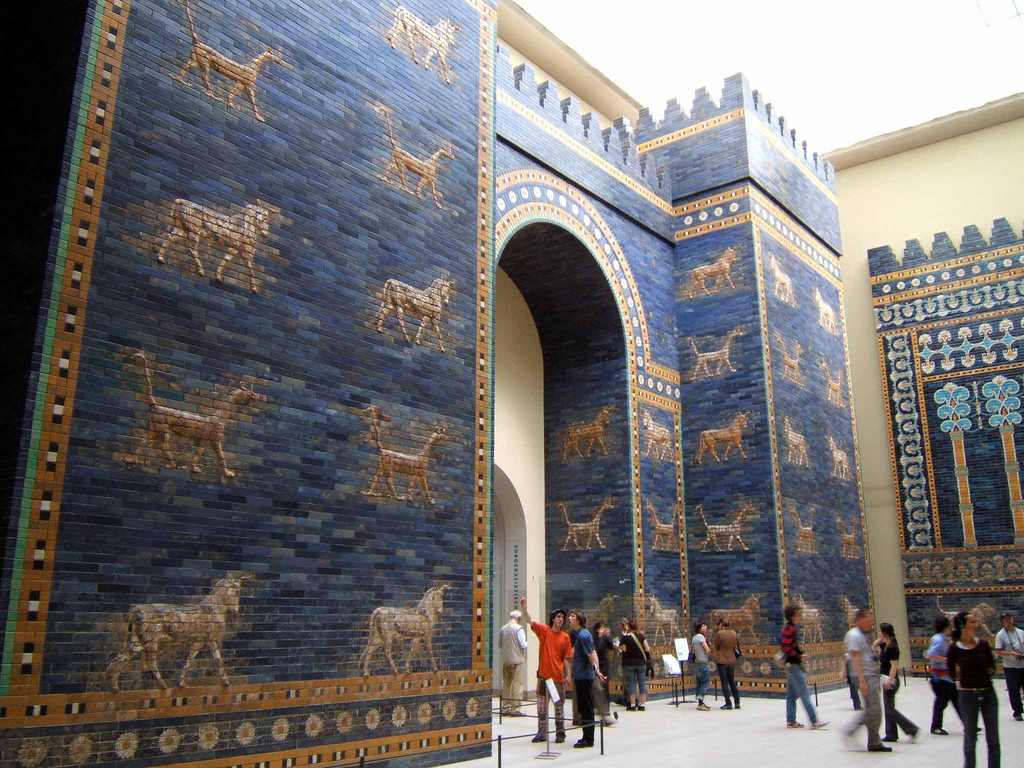
The reconstructed Ishtar Gate of Babylon at the Pergamon Museum

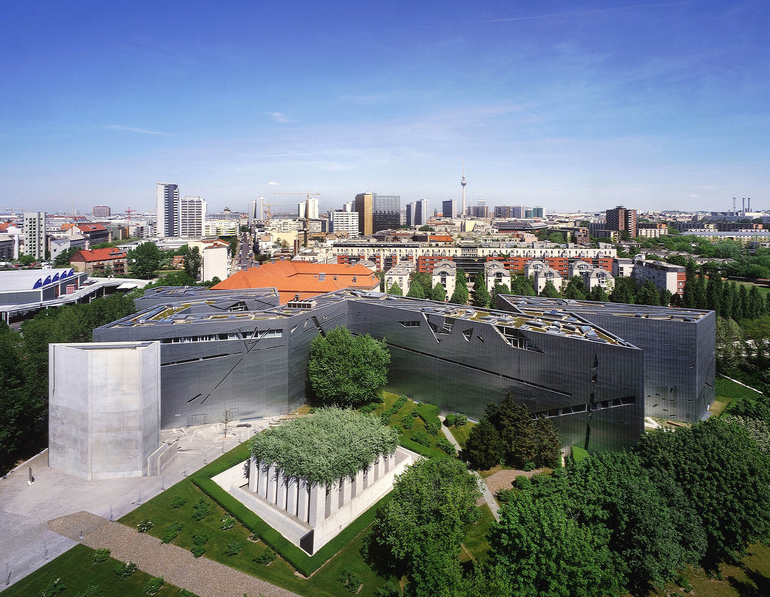
The Jewish Museum presents two millennia of German–Jewish history.

The Jewish Museum has a standing exhibition on two millennia of German-Jewish history. The German Museum of Technology in Kreuzberg has a large collection of historical technical artifacts. The Museum für Naturkunde (Berlin's natural history museum) exhibits natural history near Berlin Hauptbahnhof. It has the largest mounted dinosaur in the world (a Giraffatitan skeleton). A well-preserved specimen of Tyrannosaurus rex and the early bird Archaeopteryx are at display as well.

In Dahlem, there are several museums of world art and culture, such as the Museum of Asian Art, the Ethnological Museum, the Museum of European Cultures, as well as the Allied Museum. The Brücke Museum features one of the largest collection of works by artist of the early 20th-century expressionist movement. In Lichtenberg, on the grounds of the former East German Ministry for State Security, is the Stasi Museum. The site of Checkpoint Charlie, one of the most renowned crossing points of the Berlin Wall, is still preserved. A private museum venture exhibits a comprehensive documentation of detailed plans and strategies devised by people who tried to flee from the East.

The Beate Uhse Erotic Museum claimed to be the largest erotic museum in the world until it closed in 2014.

The cityscape of Berlin displays large quantities of urban street art. It has become a significant part of the city's cultural heritage and has its roots in the graffiti scene of Kreuzberg of the 1980s. The Berlin Wall itself has become one of the largest open-air canvasses in the world. The leftover stretch along the Spree river in Friedrichshain remains as the East Side Gallery. Berlin today is consistently rated as an important world city for street art culture. Berlin has galleries which are quite rich in contemporary art. Located in Mitte, KW Institute for Contemporary Art, KOW, Sprüth Magers; Kreuzberg there are a few galleries as well such as Blain Southern, Esther Schipper, Future Gallery, König Gallerie.

=== Nightlife and festivals ===
Berlin's nightlife has been celebrated as one of the most diverse and vibrant of its kind. In the 1970s and 80s, the SO36 in Kreuzberg was a center for punk music and culture. The SOUND and the Dschungel gained notoriety. Throughout the 1990s, people in their 20s from all over the world, particularly those in Western and Central Europe, made Berlin's club scene a premier nightlife venue. After the fall of the Berlin Wall in 1989, many historic buildings in Mitte, the former city center of East Berlin, were illegally occupied and re-built by young squatters and became a fertile ground for underground and counterculture gatherings. The central boroughs are home to many nightclubs, including the Tresor and the Berghain. The KitKatClub and several other locations are known for their sexually uninhibited parties.

Clubs are not required to close at a fixed time during the weekends, and many parties last well into the morning or even all weekend, including near Alexanderplatz. Several venues have become a popular stage for the Neo-Burlesque scene.

Berlin has a long history of gay culture, and is an important birthplace of the LGBT rights movement. Same-sex bars and dance halls operated freely as early as the 1880s, and the first gay magazine, Der Eigene, started in 1896. By the 1920s, gays and lesbians had an unprecedented visibility. Today, in addition to a positive atmosphere in the wider club scene, the city again has a huge number of queer clubs and festivals. The most famous and largest are Berlin Pride, the Christopher Street Day, the Lesbian and Gay City Festival in Berlin-Schöneberg, the Kreuzberg Pride.

The annual Berlin International Film Festival (Berlinale) with around 500,000 admissions is considered to be the largest publicly attended film festival in the world. The Karneval der Kulturen (Carnival of Cultures), a multi-ethnic street parade, is celebrated every Pentecost weekend. Berlin is also well known for the cultural festival Berliner Festspiele, which includes the jazz festival JazzFest Berlin, and Young Euro Classic, the largest international festival of youth orchestras in the world. Several technology and media art festivals and conferences are held in the city, including Transmediale and Chaos Communication Congress. The annual Berlin Festival focuses on indie rock, electronic music and synthpop and is part of the International Berlin Music Week. Every year Berlin hosts one of the largest New Year's Eve celebrations in the world, attended by well over a million people. The focal point is the Brandenburg Gate, where midnight fireworks are centered, but various private fireworks displays take place throughout the entire city. Partygoers in Germany often toast the New Year with a glass of sparkling wine.

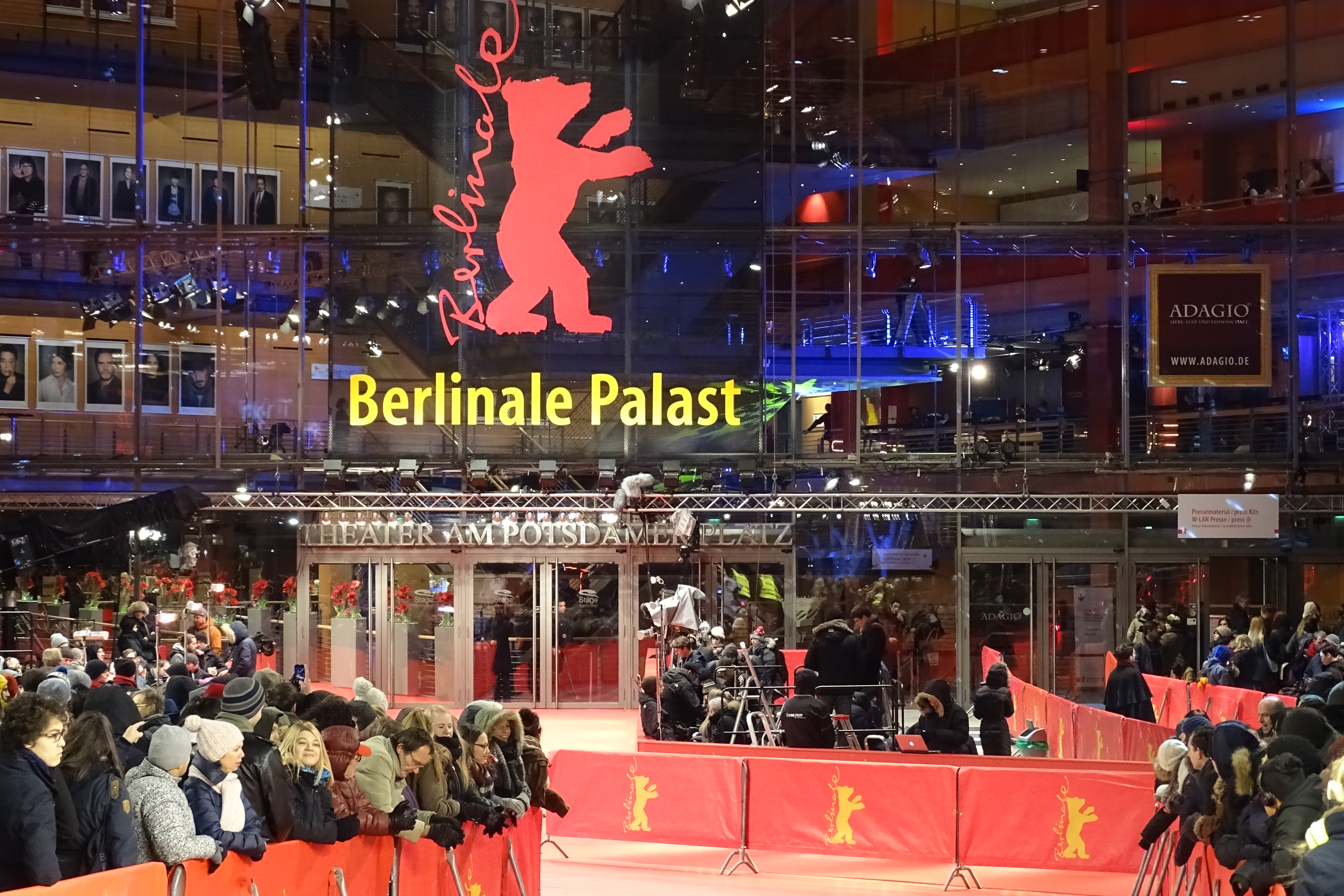
The Berlinale is the world's largest international spectator film festival.

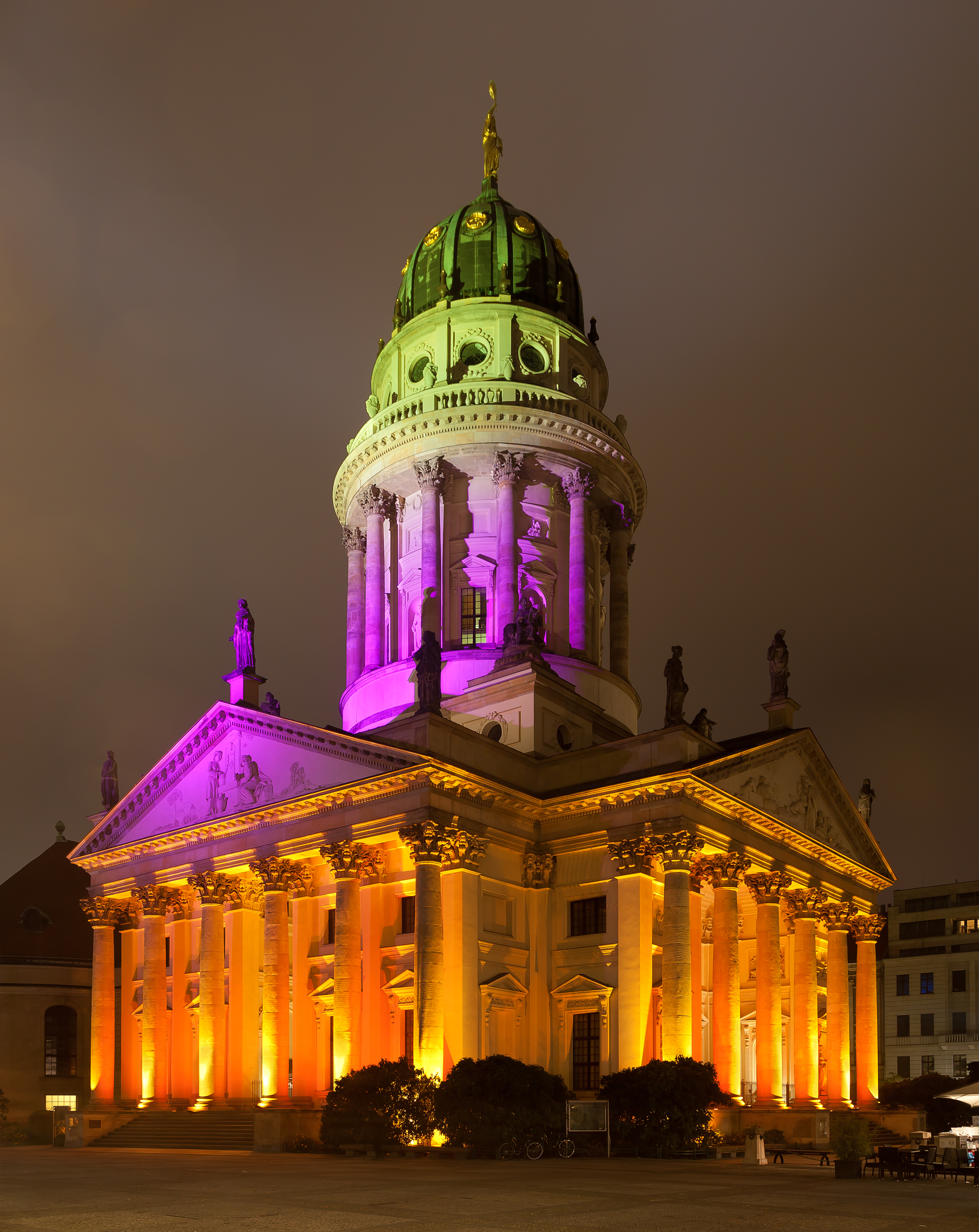
The French Cathedral during the annual Festival of Lights

Hanukkah festival at the Brandenburg Gate

=== Performing arts ===
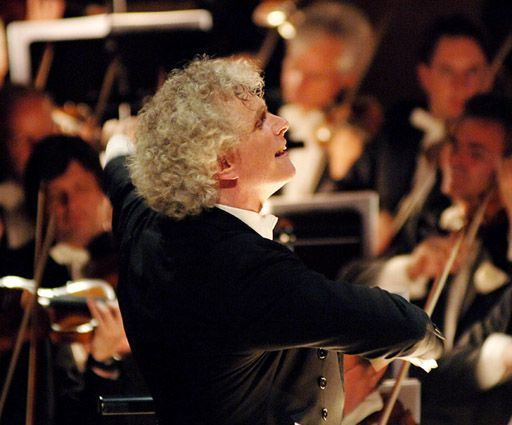
Sir Simon Rattle conducting the renowned Berlin Philharmonic

Berlin is home to 44 theaters and stages. The Deutsches Theater in Mitte was built in 1849–50 and has operated almost continuously since then. The Volksbühne at Rosa-Luxemburg-Platz was built in 1913–14, though the company had been founded in 1890. The Berliner Ensemble, famous for performing the works of Bertolt Brecht, was established in 1949. The Schaubühne was founded in 1962 and moved to the building of the former Universum Cinema on Kurfürstendamm in 1981. With a seating capacity of 1,895 and a stage floor of 2,854 square meters (30,720 sq ft), the Friedrichstadt-Palast in Berlin Mitte is the largest show palace in Europe. For Berlin's independent dance and theatre scene, venues such as the Sophiensäle in Mitte and the three houses of the Hebbel am Ufer (HAU) in Kreuzberg are important. Most productions there are also accessible to an English-speaking audience. Some of the dance and theatre groups that also work internationally (Gob Squad, Rimini Protokoll) are based there, as well as festivals such as the international festival Dance in August.

Berlin has three opera houses: the Deutsche Oper, the Berlin State Opera, and the Komische Oper. The Berlin State Opera on Unter den Linden opened in 1742 and is the oldest of the three. Its musical director is Daniel Barenboim. The Komische Oper has traditionally specialized in operettas and is also at Unter den Linden. The Deutsche Oper opened in 1912 in Charlottenburg.

The city's main venue for musical theater performances are the Theater am Potsdamer Platz and Theater des Westens (built in 1895). Contemporary dance can be seen at the Radialsystem V. The Tempodrom is host to concerts and circus-inspired entertainment. It also houses a multi-sensory spa experience. The Admiralspalast in Mitte has a vibrant program of variety and music events.

There are seven symphony orchestras in Berlin. The Berlin Philharmonic Orchestra is one of the preeminent orchestras in the world; it is housed in the Berliner Philharmonie near Potsdamer Platz on a street named for the orchestra's longest-serving conductor, Herbert von Karajan. Simon Rattle was its principal conductor from 1999 to 2018, a position now held by Kirill Petrenko. The Konzerthausorchester Berlin was founded in 1952 as the orchestra for East Berlin. Christoph Eschenbach is its principal conductor. The Haus der Kulturen der Welt presents exhibitions dealing with intercultural issues and stages world music and conferences. The Kookaburra and the Quatsch Comedy Club are known for satire and comedy shows. In 2018, the New York Times described Berlin as "arguably the world capital of underground electronic music".

=== Cuisine ===
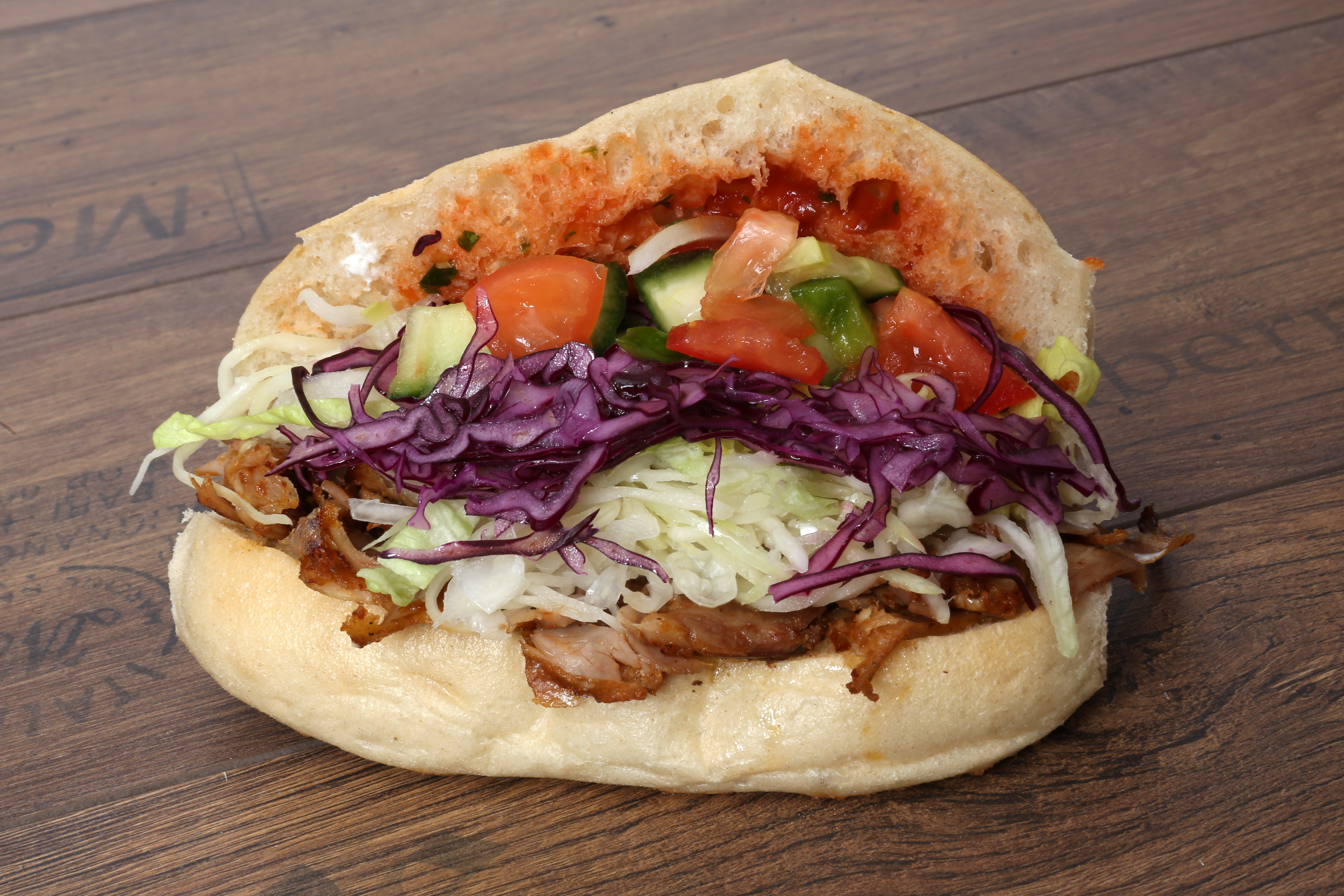
Döner kebab

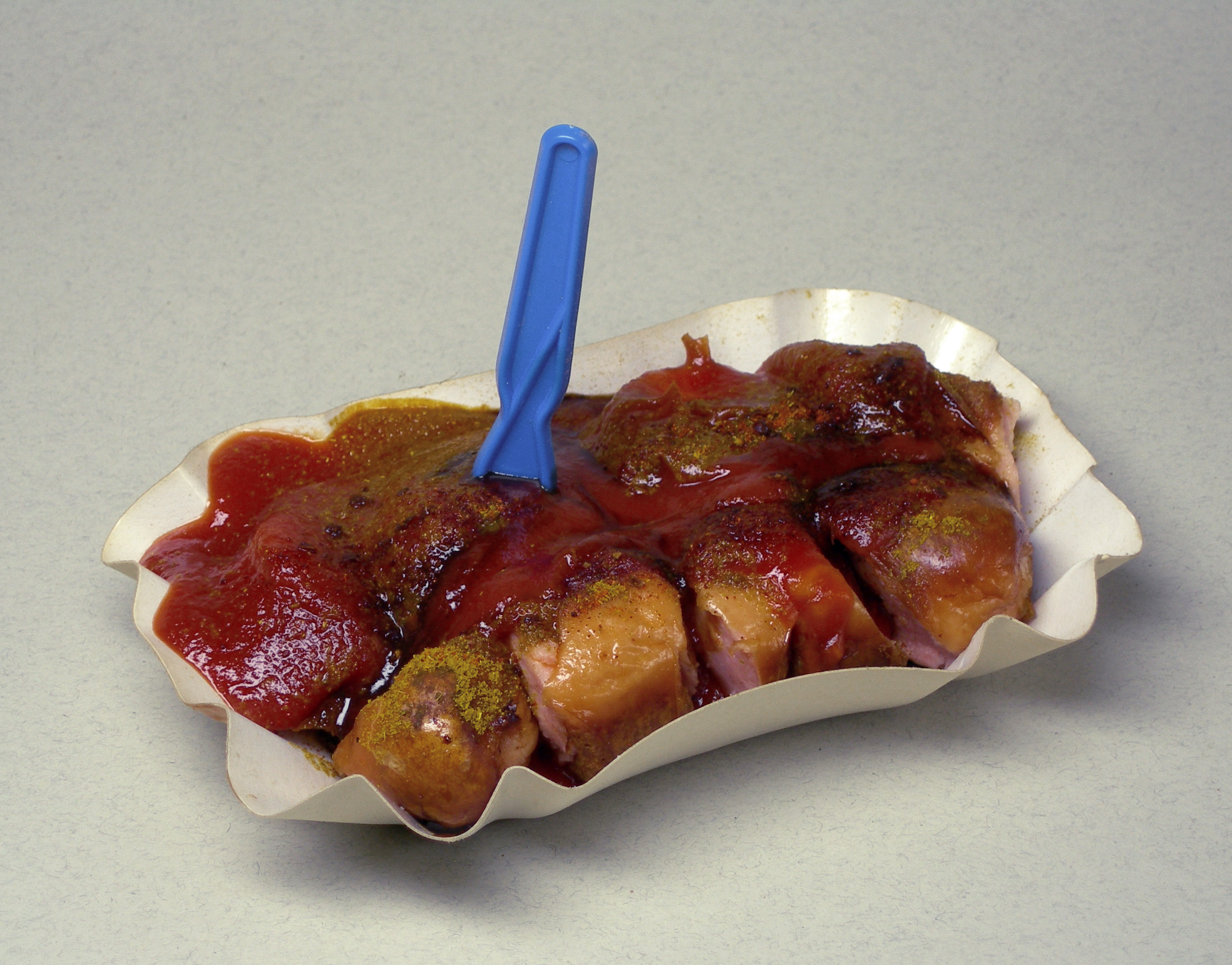
A plate of Currywurst

Invented in Berlin, currywurst and modern döner are icons of German popular culture and cuisine.

The cuisine and culinary offerings of Berlin vary greatly. 23 restaurants in Berlin have been awarded one or more Michelin stars in the Michelin Guide of 2021, which ranks the city at the top for the number of restaurants having this distinction in Germany. Berlin is well known for its offerings of vegetarian and vegan cuisine and is home to an innovative entrepreneurial food scene promoting cosmopolitan flavors, local and sustainable ingredients, pop-up street food markets, supper clubs, as well as food festivals, such as Berlin Food Week.

Many local foods originated from north German culinary traditions and include rustic and hearty dishes with pork, goose, fish, peas, beans, cucumbers, or potatoes. Typical Berliner fare include popular street food like the Currywurst (which gained popularity with postwar construction workers rebuilding the city), Buletten and the Berliner donut, known in Berlin as Pfannkuchen (German: [ˈp͡fanˌkuːxn̩]). German bakeries offering a variety of breads and pastries are widespread. One of Europe's largest delicatessen markets is found at the KaDeWe, and among the world's largest chocolate stores is Rausch.

Berlin is also home to a diverse gastronomy scene reflecting the immigrant history of the city. Turkish and Arab immigrants brought their culinary traditions to the city, such as the lahmacun and falafel, which have become common fast food staples. The modern fast-food version of the doner kebab sandwich which evolved in Berlin in the 1970s, has since become a favorite dish in Germany and elsewhere in the world. Asian cuisine like Chinese, Vietnamese, Thai, Indian, Korean, and Japanese restaurants, as well as Spanish tapas bars, Italian, and Greek cuisine, can be found in many parts of the city.

=== Recreation ===
Zoologischer Garten Berlin, the older of two zoos in the city, was founded in 1844. It is the most visited zoo in Europe and presents the most diverse range of species in the world. It was the home of the captive-born celebrity polar bear Knut. The city's other zoo, Tierpark Friedrichsfelde, was founded in 1955.

Berlin's Botanischer Garten includes the Botanic Museum Berlin. With an area of 43 hectares (110 acres) and around 22,000 different plant species, it is one of the largest and most diverse collections of botanical life in the world. Other gardens in the city include the Britzer Garten, and the Gärten der Welt (Gardens of the World) in Marzahn.

The Tiergarten park in Mitte, with landscape design by Peter Joseph Lenné, is one of Berlin's largest and most popular parks. In Kreuzberg, the Viktoriapark provides a viewing point over the southern part of inner-city Berlin. Treptower Park, beside the Spree in Treptow, features a large Soviet War Memorial. The Volkspark in Friedrichshain, which opened in 1848, is the oldest park in the city, with monuments, a summer outdoor cinema and several sports areas. Tempelhofer Feld, the site of the former city airport, is the world's largest inner-city open space.

Potsdam is on the southwestern periphery of Berlin. The city was a residence of the Prussian kings and the German Kaiser until 1918. The area around Potsdam, in particular Sanssouci, is known for a series of interconnected lakes and cultural landmarks. The Palaces and Parks of Potsdam and Berlin are the largest World Heritage Site in Germany.

Berlin is also well known for its numerous cafés, street musicians, beach bars along the Spree River, flea markets, boutique shops and pop-up stores, which provide recreation and leisure opportunities.

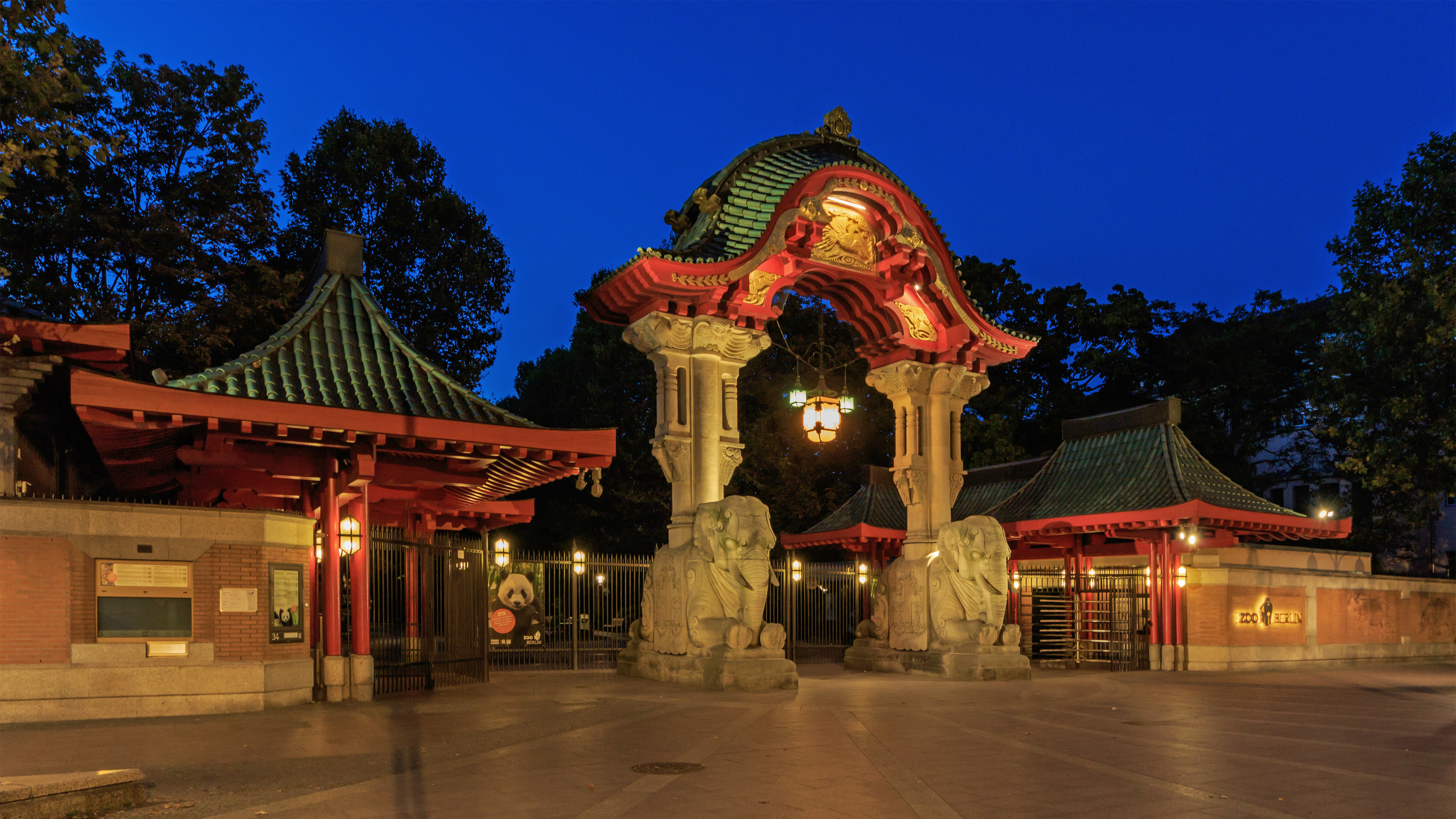
The Elephant Gate at the Berlin Zoo

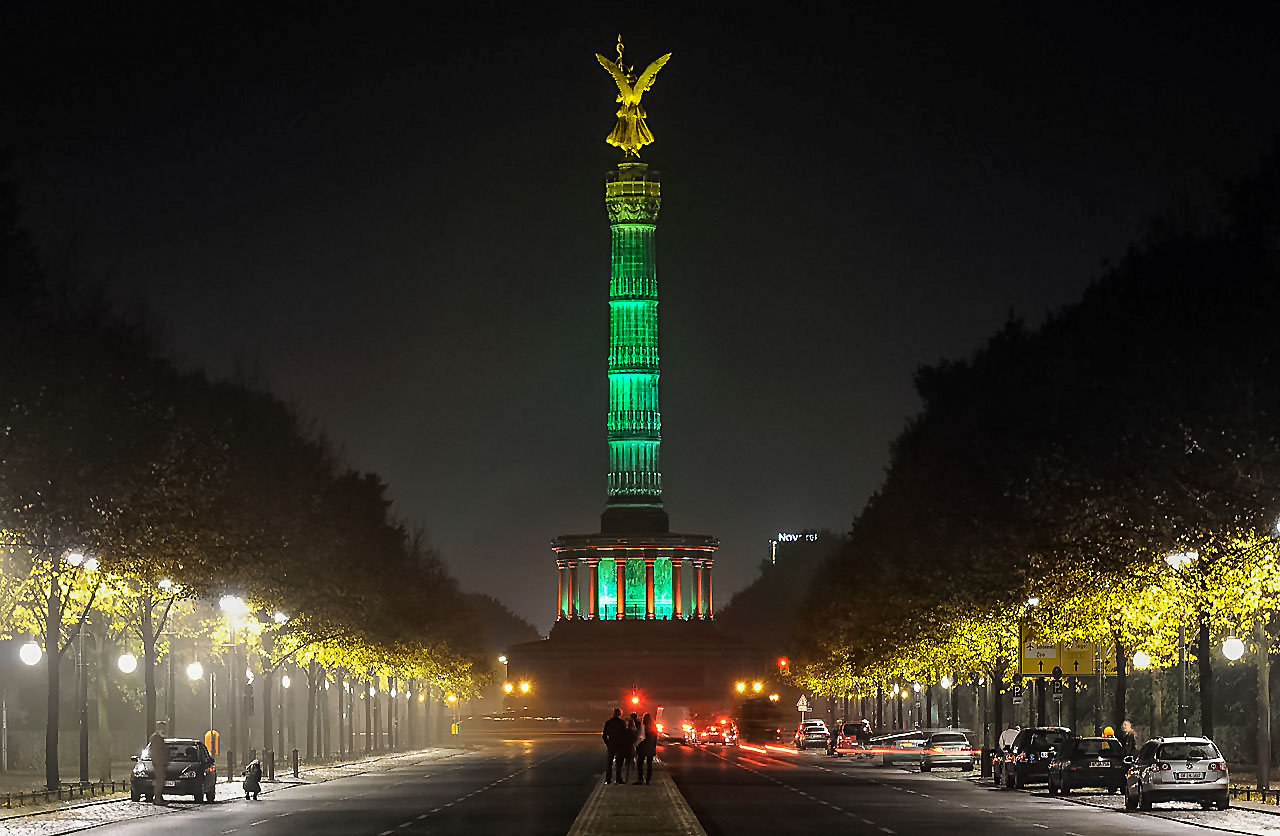
The Victory Column in Tiergarten

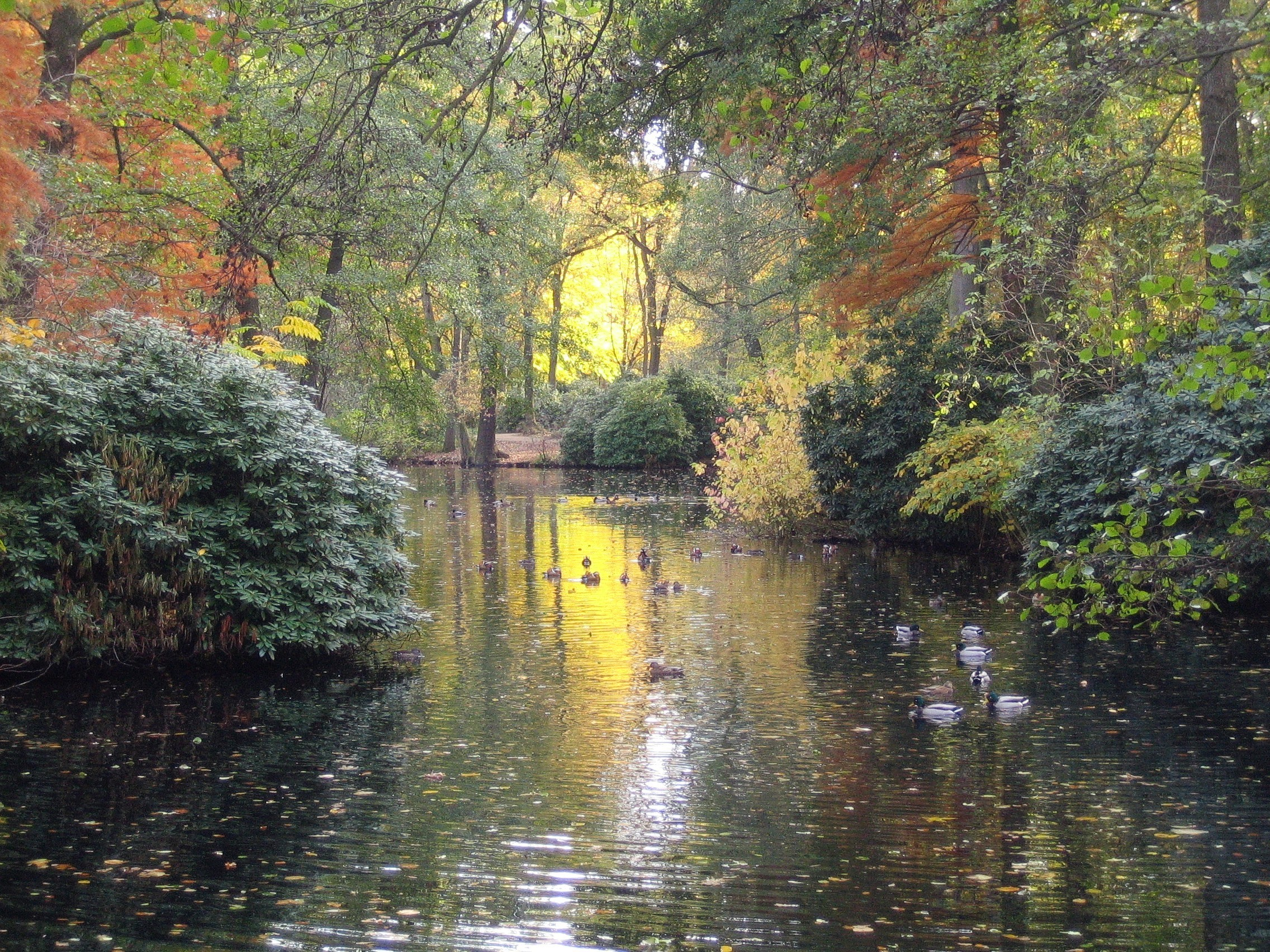
Inside Tiergarten (park)

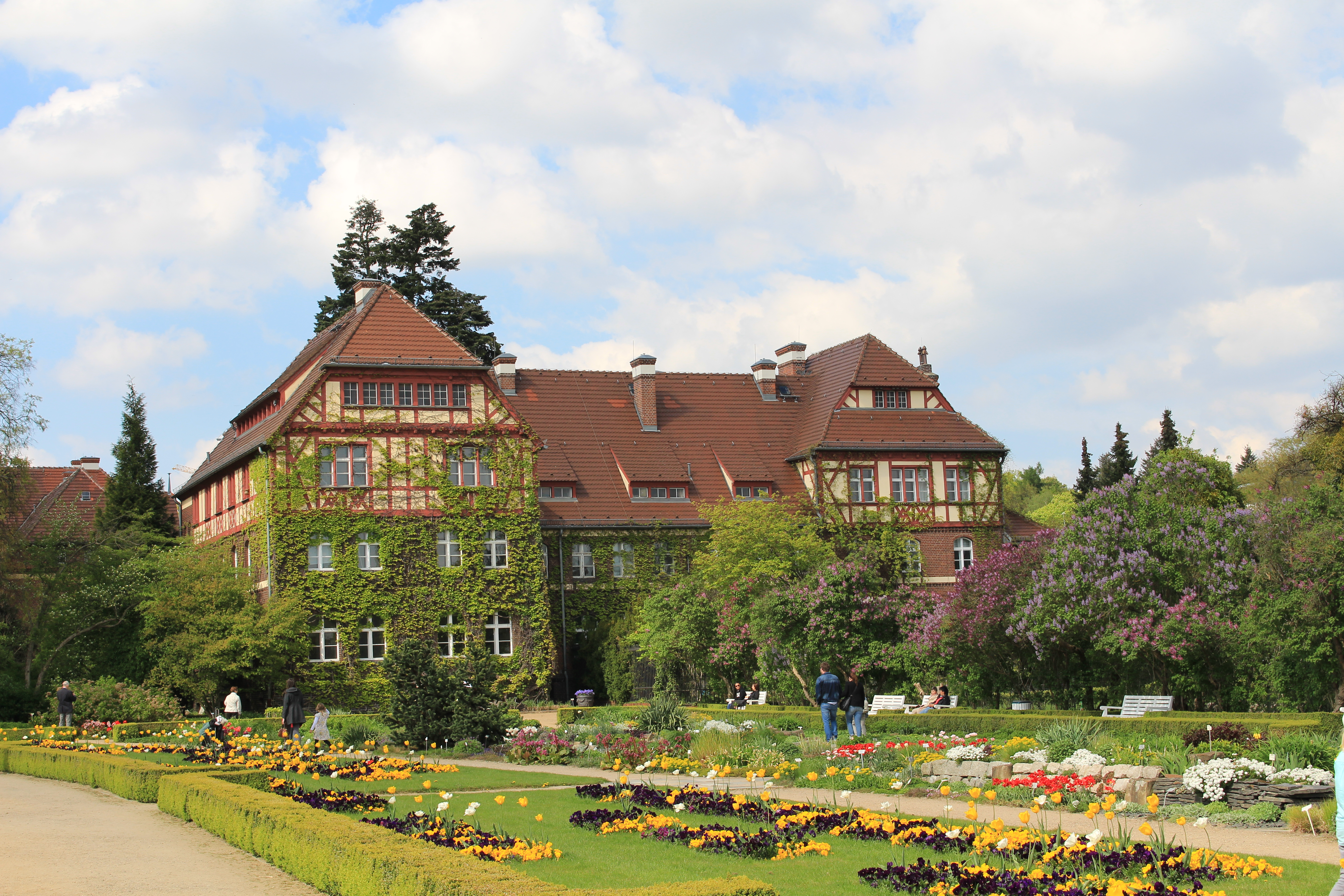
Inside Berlin Botanical Garden and Botanical Museum

== Sports ==
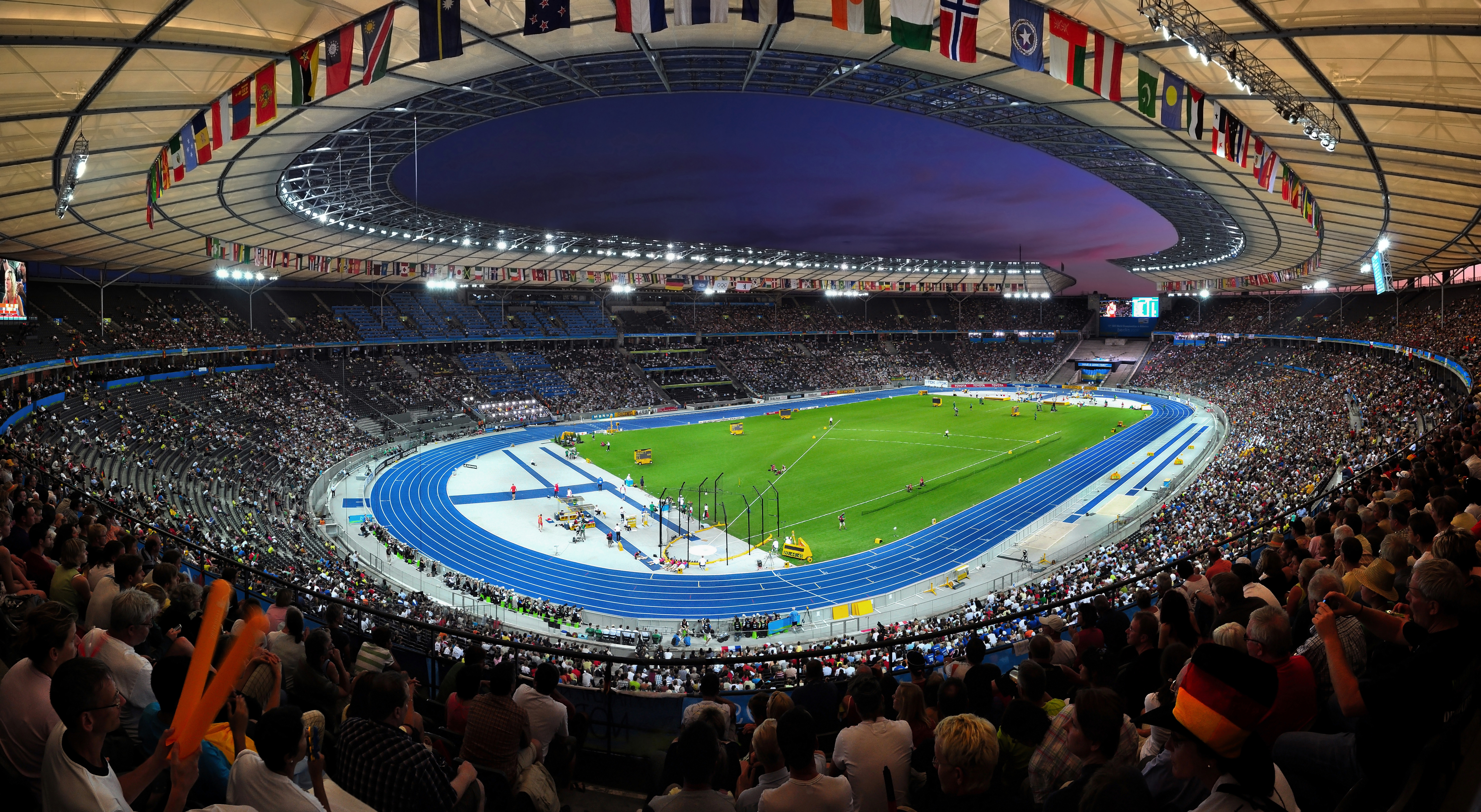
The Olympiastadion hosted the 1936 Summer Olympics, the 2006 FIFA World Cup final, and the UEFA Euro 2024 final.

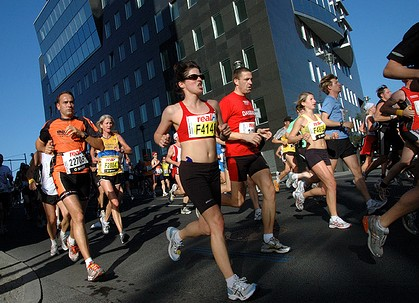
The Berlin Marathon is the current second world record course (world record course is as of August 2024 Chicago Marathon).

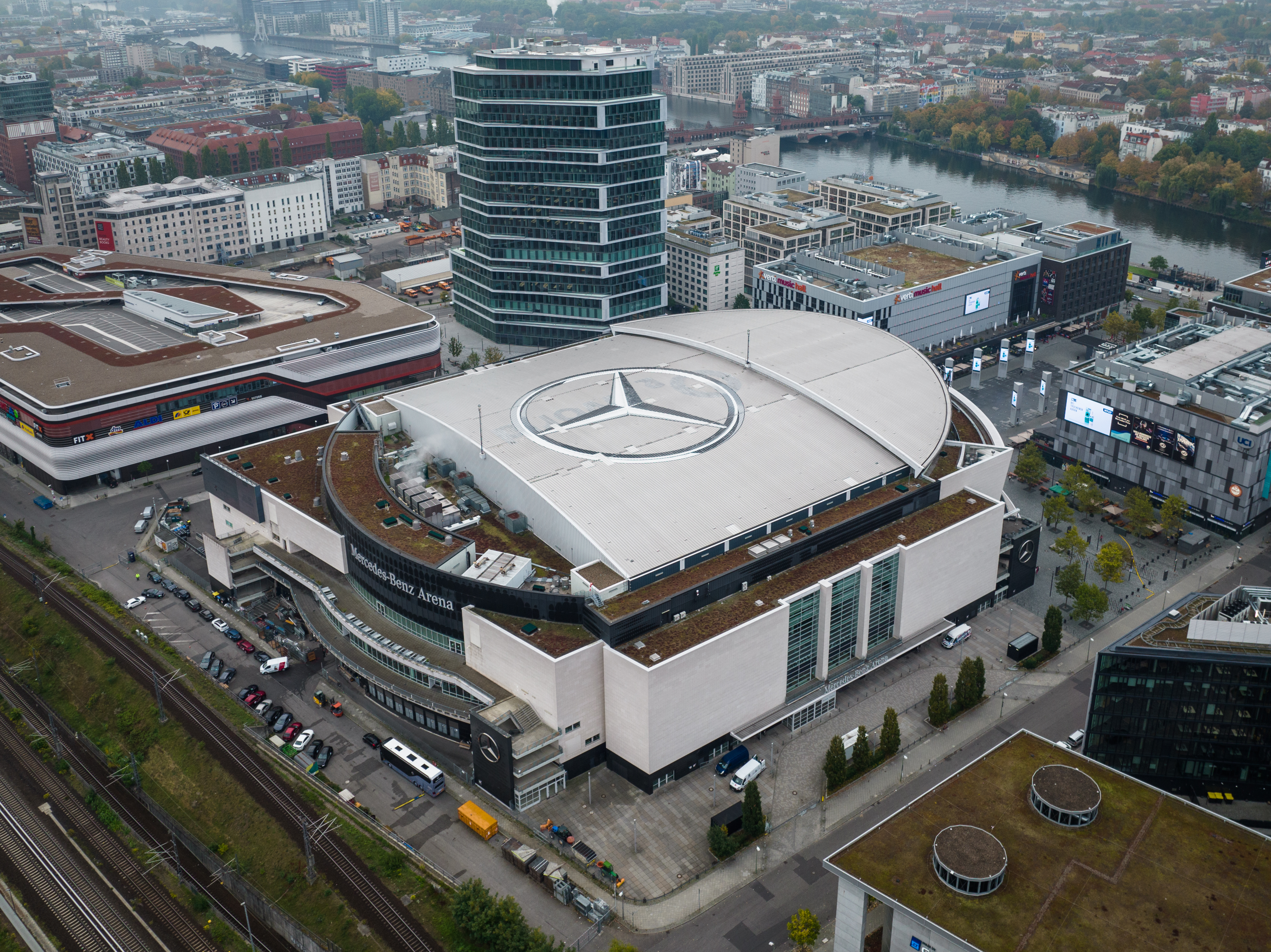
Uber Arena (formerly O2 World Berlin, later Mercedes-Benz Arena)

Berlin has established a high-profile as a host city of major international sporting events. The city hosted the 1936 Summer Olympics and was the host city for the 2006 FIFA World Cup final. The World Athletics Championships was held at Olympiastadion in 2009. The city hosted the Euroleague Final Four basketball competition in 2009 and 2016, and was one of the hosts of FIBA EuroBasket 2015. In 2015 Berlin was the venue for the UEFA Champions League Final. The city bid to host the 2000 Summer Olympics but lost to Sydney.

Berlin hosted the 2023 Special Olympics World Summer Games. This is the first time Germany has ever hosted the Special Olympics World Games.

The annual Berlin Marathon – a course that holds the most top-10 world record runs – and the ISTAF are well-established athletic events in the city. The Mellowpark in Köpenick is one of the biggest skate and BMX parks in Europe. A fan fest at Brandenburg Gate, which attracts several hundreds of thousands of spectators, has become popular during international football competitions, such as the UEFA European Championship.

Friedrich Ludwig Jahn, who is often hailed as the "father of modern gymnastics", invented the horizontal bar, parallel bars, rings, and the vault around 1811 in Berlin. Jahn's Turners movement, first realized at Volkspark Hasenheide, was the origin of modern sports clubs. In 2013, around 600,000 Berliners were registered in one of the more than 2,300 sport and fitness clubs. The city of Berlin operates more than 60 public indoor and outdoor swimming pools. Berlin is the largest Olympic training center in Germany, with around 500 top athletes (15% of all German top athletes) being based there. 47 elite athletes participated in the 2012 Summer Olympics. Berliners would achieve 7 gold, 12 silver, and 3 bronze medals.

Several professional clubs representing the most important spectator team sports in Germany are based in Berlin. The oldest and most popular first-division team based in Berlin is the football club Hertha BSC. The team represented Berlin as a founding member of the Bundesliga in 1963. Other professional team sport clubs include:

| Club(s) | Sport(s) | Founded | League(s) | Venue(s) |
|---|---|---|---|---|
| 1. FC Union Berlin | Football | 1966 | Bundesliga | Stadion An der Alten Försterei |
| Hertha BSC | Football | 1892 | 2. Bundesliga | Olympiastadion |
| ALBA Berlin | Basketball | 1991 | BBL | Uber Arena |
| Berlin Thunder | American football | 2021 | ELF | Friedrich-Ludwig-Jahn-Sportpark |
| Eisbären Berlin | Ice hockey | 1954 | DEL | Uber Arena |
| Füchse Berlin | Handball | 1891 | HBL | Max-Schmeling-Halle |
| Berlin Recycling Volleys | Volleyball | 1991 | Bundesliga | Max-Schmeling-Halle |
| Berliner Hockey Club | Lacrosse | 2005 | Bundesliga | Ernst-Reuter-Feld |
| Berliner RC | Rugby Union | 1926 | Rugby-Bundesliga | Sportanlage Jungfernheide |
| RK 03 Berlin | Rugby Union | 1967 | Rugby-Bundesliga | Stadion Buschallee |
| FC Liria Berlin | Futsal | 1985 | Futsal Bundesliga | Bezirkssporthalle Neukölln - Werner-Seelenbinder-Sportpark |

== See also ==
- List of fiction set in Berlin
- List of honorary citizens of Berlin
- List of people from Berlin
- List of songs about Berlin
