= Chernyshevskoye =

Human settlement in Nesterovsky District, Kaliningrad Oblast, Russia

Chernyshevskoye Черныше́вское
- Rural locality
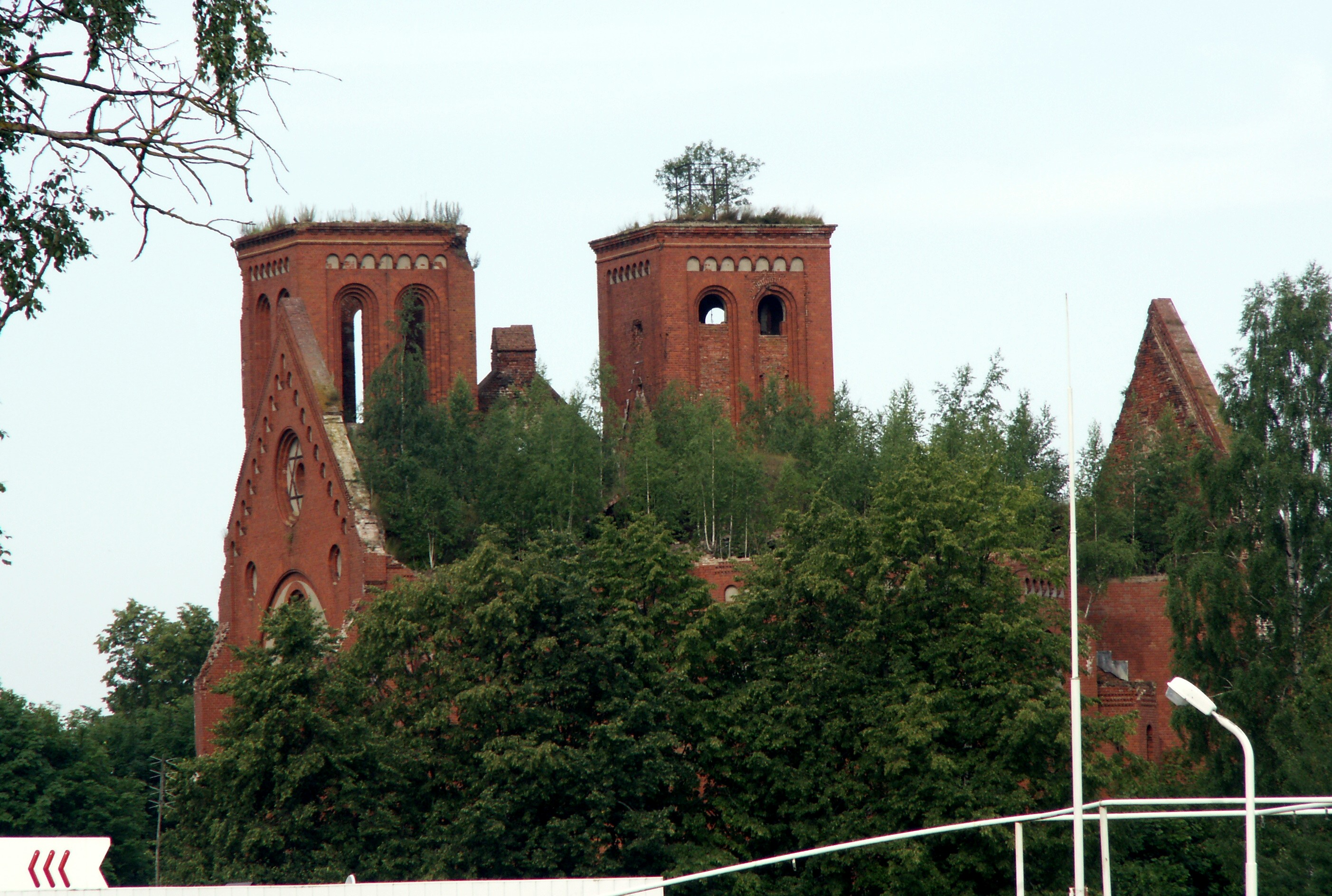
- Ruins of the Protestant church
- Interactive map of Chernyshevskoye
- Location of Chernyshevskoye Chernyshevskoye (European Russia) Chernyshevskoye (Russia)
- Coordinates: 54°38′28″N 22°44′15″E
- Country: Russia
- Federal subject: Kaliningrad Oblast
- Founded: 1525 (Julian)

Population
  - Estimate (2021): 819 )
- Time zone: UTC+2 (MSK–1)
- Postal code: 238000
- OKTMO ID: 27624404176

Chernyshevskoye (Russian: Черныше́вское; German: Eydtkuhnen, from 1938: Eydtkau; Lithuanian: Eitkūnai; Polish: Ejtkuny) is a settlement in Nesterovsky District in the eastern part of Kaliningrad Oblast, Russia, close to the border with Lithuania. Between Chernyshevskoye and Lithuanian Kybartai is an important 24-hour border crossing point on the A229 principal road (part of the European route E28). Chernyshevskoye railway station is an important border railway station on the railway line connecting Kaliningrad with Moscow through Lithuania and Belarus.

== History ==
The settlement was first mentioned in the 16th century, when the area was part of the Polish Duchy of Prussia, near the border with Lithuania. In 1772, it became part of the newly formed Prussian province of East Prussia. At this time, the king of Prussia was attempting to populate the region of East Prussia with Protestants.

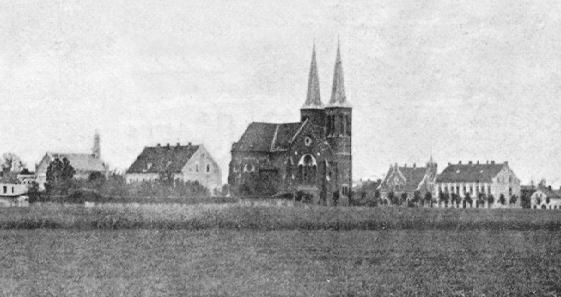
Eydtkuhnen church, about 1909

In 1860, Eydtkuhnen became the eastern terminus and border station of the Prussian Eastern Railway, connecting Berlin with the Saint Petersburg–Warsaw Railway in the Russian Empire. To continue their voyage, passengers—e.g., of the Nord Express luxury train coming from Saint Petersburg—had to change over from Russian broad gauge to standard gauge railcars to Berlin and Paris, leaving on the other side of the platform. The same interchange in the opposite direction was provided at the Russian train station in neighboring Virbalis. The Eydtkuhnen station building, erected according to plans by Friedrich August Stüler, offered luxuriously furnished waiting rooms and restaurants.

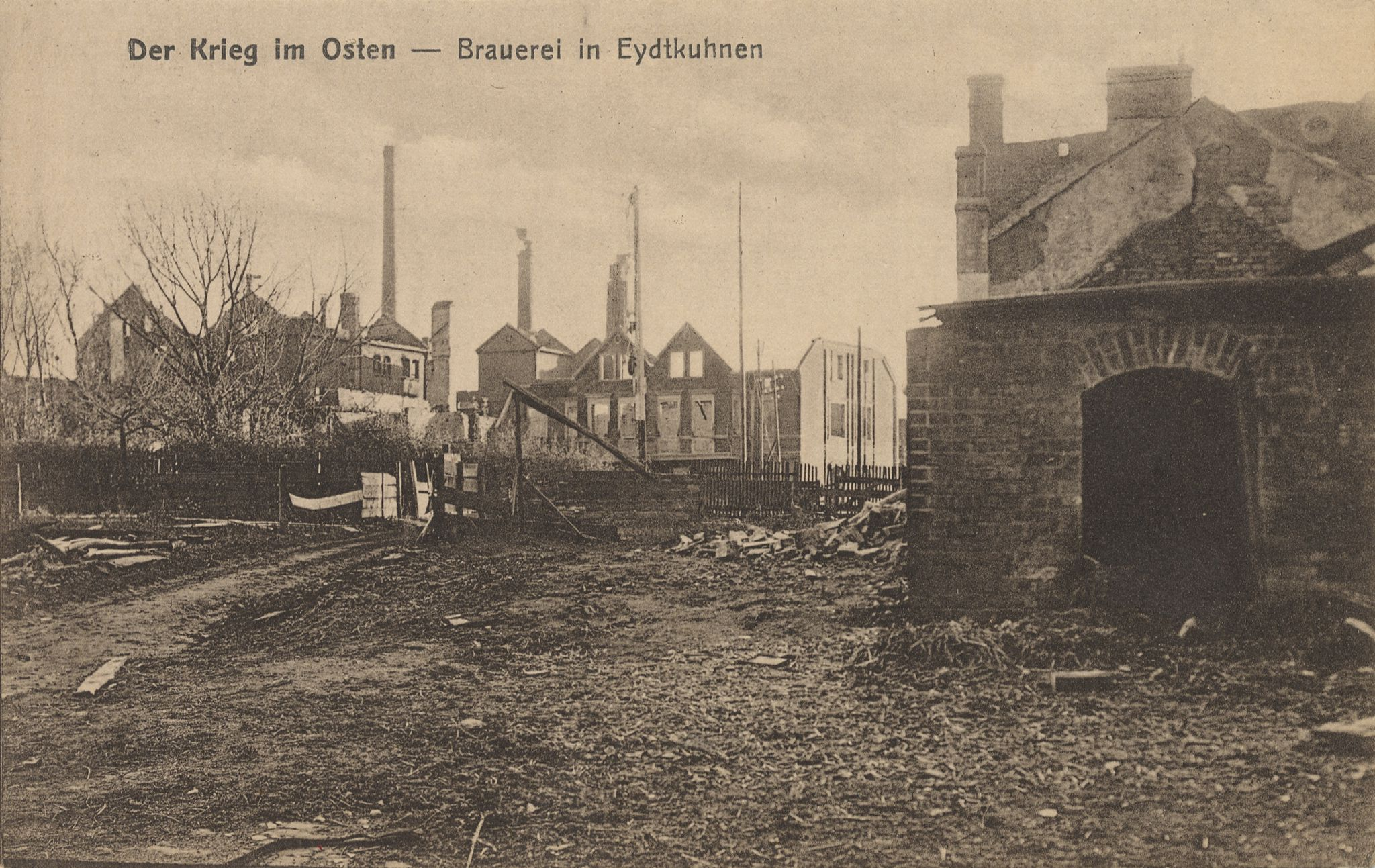
At the beginning of the First World War, the brewery in Eydtkuhnen was destroyed

The train station of Eydtkuhnen, for which the settlement was famous, was called the gateway of trade to Russia from East Prussia.

The railway connection decisively promoted Eydtkuhnen's development, and the settlement expanded to the north. The local railway station, post office and customs offices had 508, 110 and 54 employees, respectively. Local trade was dominated by Jews, and there was a synagogue. The Neo-Romanesque Lutheran parish church was built according to plans by Friedrich Adler and consecrated in 1889; the settlement received town privileges in 1922, when the population reached 10,000. During this time, Wilhelm Reinke served as town mayor, a position he held until 1932. Nevertheless, Eydtkuhnen was devastated during the Russian invasion of East Prussia in 1914 and again in 1945 during the East Prussian Offensive of the Red Army. After World War I and the Act of Independence, the border crossing led to Lithuania, while corridor trains provided the railway connection to Berlin.

After Nazi Germany's defeat in World War II, the settlement became part of the Soviet Union, while the remaining German population was expelled.

Up to today, large parts of Chernyshevskoye are a military restricted area.

== Demographics ==
Historical population
Year	Pop.	±%
1839	97	—
1868	1,125	+1059.8%
1871	2,365	+110.2%
1895	3,347	+41.5%
1900	3,707	+10.8%
1905	5,036	+35.9%
1914	6,832	+35.7%
2021	819	−88.0%

Distribution of the population by ethnicity according to the 2021 census:

	percent
Russians	78.39%
Lithuanians	4.64%
Ukrainians	2.81%
Azeris	1.71%
Tatars	1.59%
Germans	1.10%
Belarusians	0.98%
refused answer or no data	6.11%

== Notable people ==
- Gertrud von Puttkamer (1881–1944), writer
- Felix Bressart (1892–1949), actor
- Barnett A. Elzas (1867–1936), rabbi and historian
