= Virbalis =

- Town
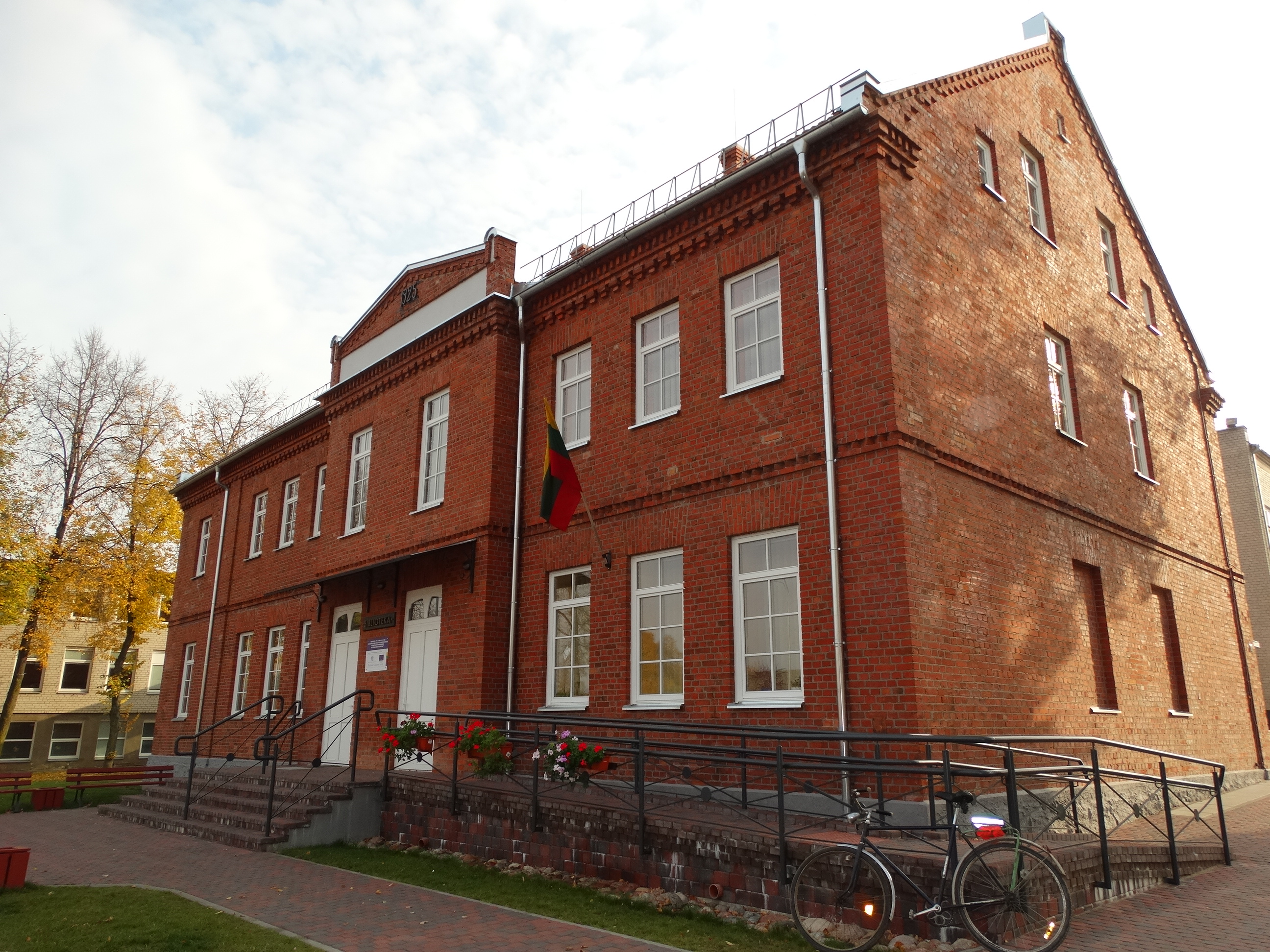
- Virbalis eldership building

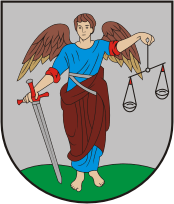
- Coat of arms

- Location of Virbalis
- Coordinates: 54°38′0″N 22°49′0″E
- Country: Lithuania
- Ethnographic region: Suvalkija
- County: Marijampolė County
- Municipality: Vilkaviškis district municipality
- Eldership: Virbalis eldership
- Capital of: Virbalis eldership
- First mentioned: 1529
- Granted town rights: 1593

Population (2020)
  - Total: 895
- Time zone: UTC+2 (EET)
  - Summer (DST): UTC+3 (EEST)

Virbalis (Polish: Wierzbołów, Yiddish: ווירבאַלן, romanized: Virbaln, German: Wirballen) is a city in the Vilkaviškis district municipality, Lithuania. It is located 12 km (7.5 mi) west of Vilkaviškis.

== History ==
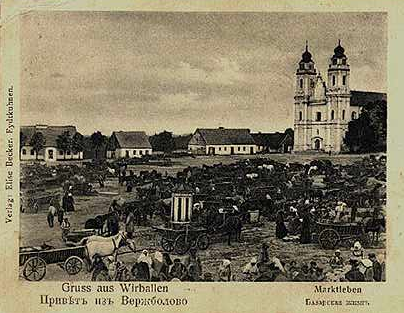
Market in Virbalis and its old church

It is frequently mentioned in historical as well in modern literature. In 1529–67 Virbalis was mentioned in the lists of non-privileged cities of the Grand Duchy of Lithuania. In 1536 Virbalis received the privilege of founding the city and a market. In 1555 a church was built. In 1576 it was allowed to held markets in Virbalis. In 1593 Virbalis received the Magdeburg rights and the coat of arms. In 1601 a workshop of various crafts was established, in 1602 – a shoemaker and tailors' workshop. From 1643 to 1819 there was a Dominican Monastery, and in the middle of the 17th century a Dominican Church was built in the city (which was blown up in 1944). In 1646 a Virbalis Parish School is mentioned. It was the site of the formation of the Virbalis Confederation (Polish: Konfederacja w Wierzbołowie) by Janusz Radziwiłł in 1655 during the Deluge (part of the Second Northern War) whose main purpose was to defend the King of Poland and Grand Duke of Lithuania John II Casimir Vasa. In 1785–1819 there was a three classes school, in 1819–70 a parish school, and later a public school.

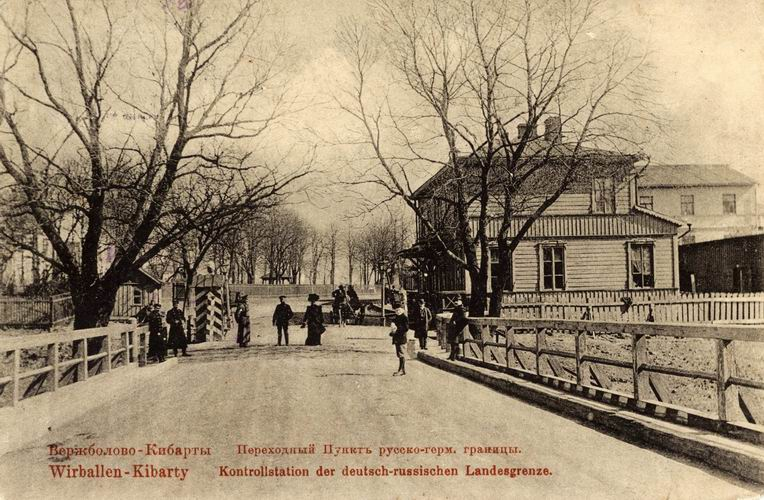
Control post of the border between the German and Russian empires

When in 1861 a branch of the Saint Petersburg–Warsaw Railway was built through Virbalis from Vilnius to the Prussian border, where it was linked to the Prussian Eastern Railway, the Russian border station near the village of Kybartai was named after the neighbouring town of Verzhbolovo. Meanwhile, Kybartai has become a town bigger than Virbalis, and the Lithuanian border station is now called Kybartai, too. It was the first station for stagecoaches and later the first railway station in the Russian Empire when leaving Prussia. A steam locomotive was parked at the railway station to transport the tsar around Russian Empire (since it was the border of the empire). The German station of the Prussian Eastern Railway on the western side of the frontier was Eydtkuhnen (Lithuanian: Eitkūnai); today, as consequence of the annexation of the northern part of East Prussia by the Soviet Union in 1945, it is a Russian border station and is called Chernyshevskoye (Russian: Черныше́вское).

In 1914, there was the Battle of Virbalis, which was among the first of World War I.

Following the restoration of Independence of Lithuania in 1918, Virbalis became part of the restored Lithuania and had a power plant, a brick factory, 3 windmills, an oil press, cement workshops, lubricants workshops, a small credit society, as well as branches of the Lithuanian Christian Democratic Party, Lithuanian Nationalist Union, Lithuanian Farmers Union, Pavasarininkai, Lithuanian Riflemen's Union, and young Lithuanians (Lithuanian: jaunalietuviai). In 1932 Virbalis received second-class city rights. In 1924 a Vilkaviškis–Marijampolė bus line was opened through Virbalis, which was one of the first bus lines in Lithuania.

During World War II, the town was under Soviet occupation from 1940, and then under German occupation from 1941 to 1944. Between mid-July and autumn 1941, an Einsatzgruppe of German SS troops aided by local Lithuanian auxiliary police from Virbalis and Vilkaviškis slaughtered 670–700 Jews from Virbalis and the nearby town of Kybartai in several mass executions. A memorial was built on the site of the massacre. About 80% of Virbalis' buildings were destroyed during World War II. Following the Soviet occupation of Lithuania in 1944, Virbalis was the central settlement of the collective farm.

In 1993 the coat of arms of Virbalis was approved.

== Gallery ==
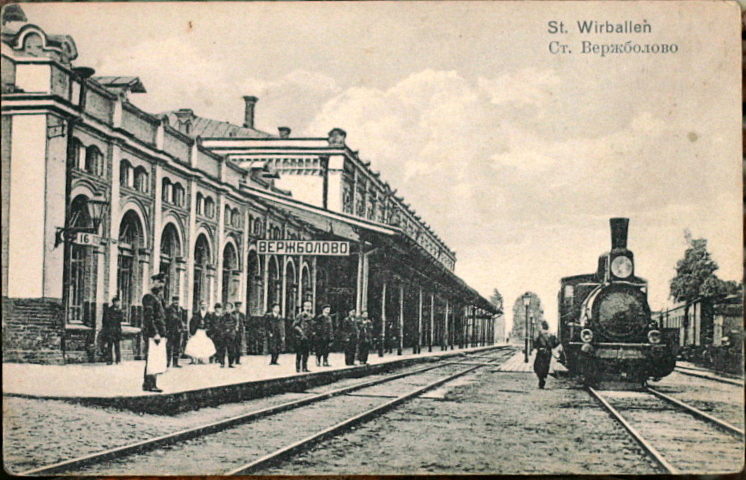
Virbalis railway station (before 1917)

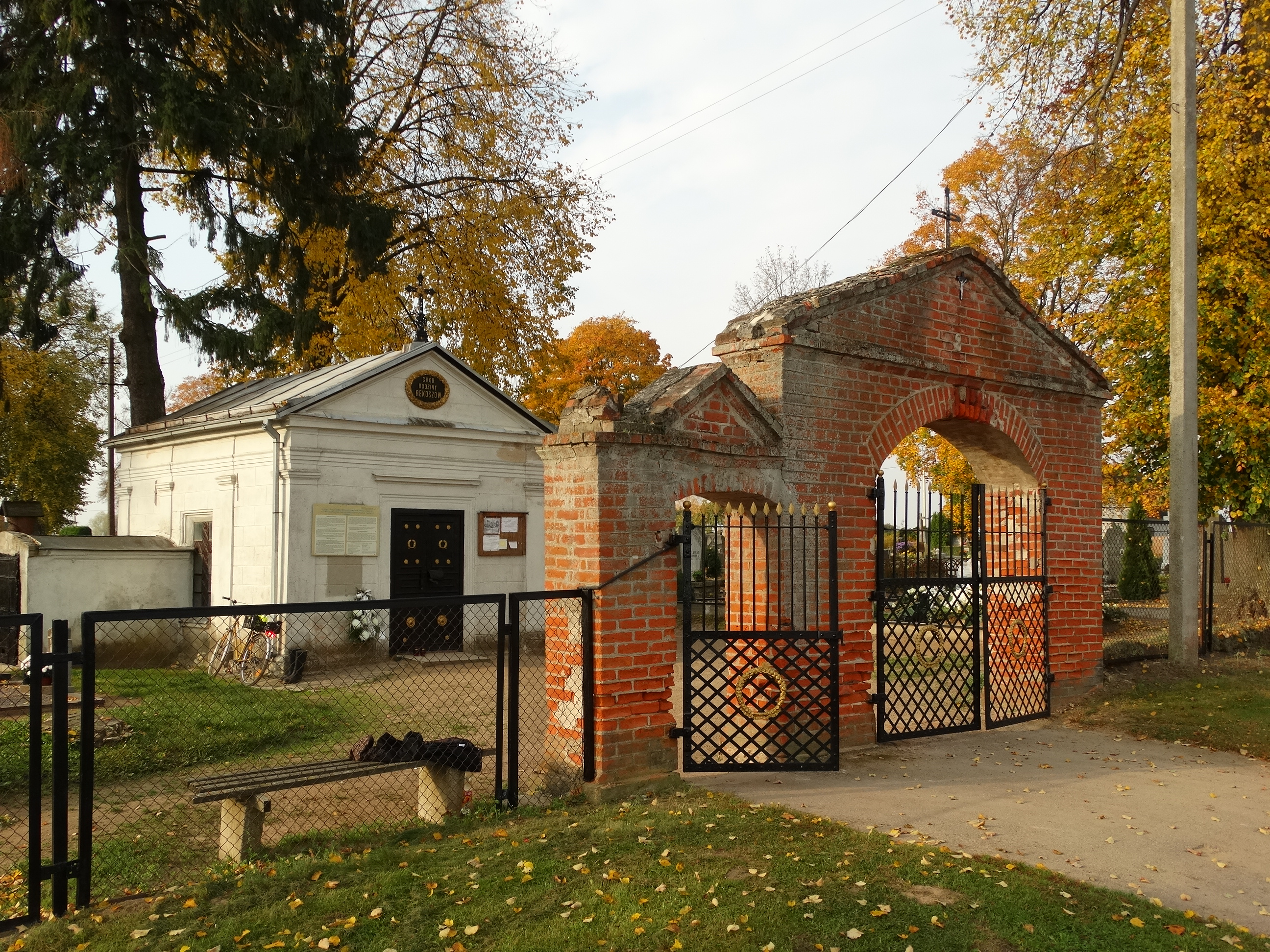
Cemetery Chapel of Rekosz family (~1860)

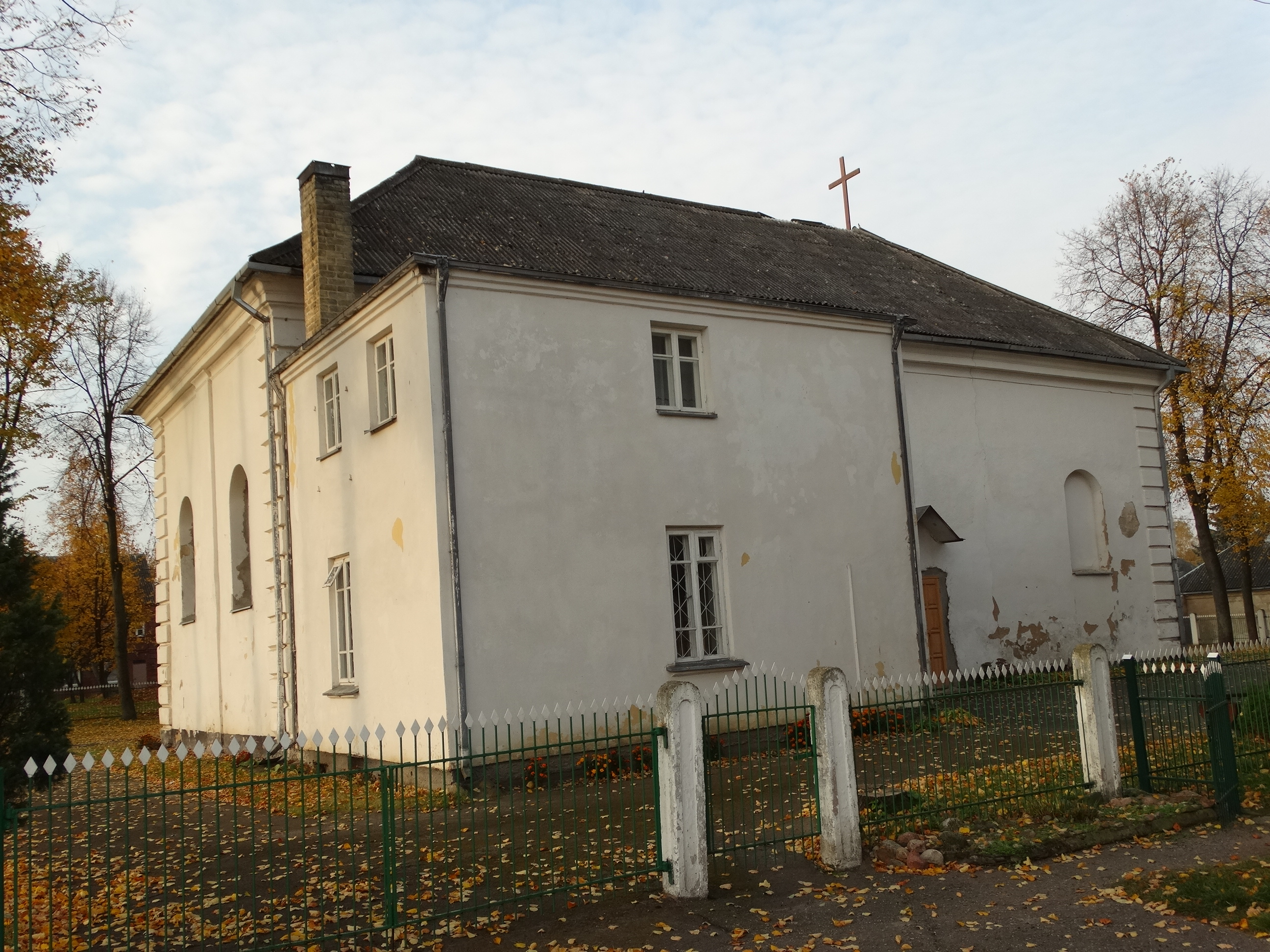
Church of St. Michael the Archangel in Virbalis

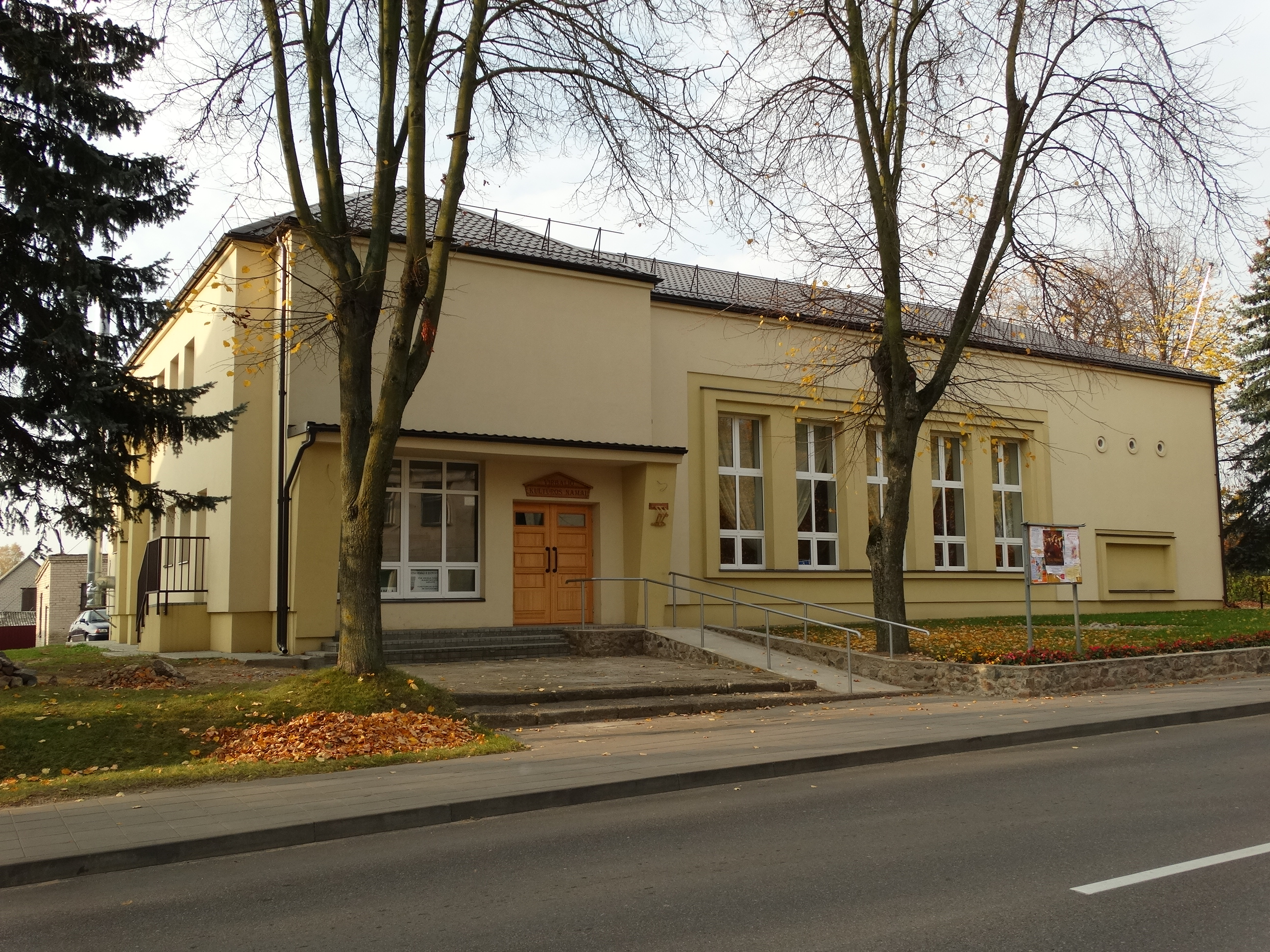
Cultural centre in Virbalis

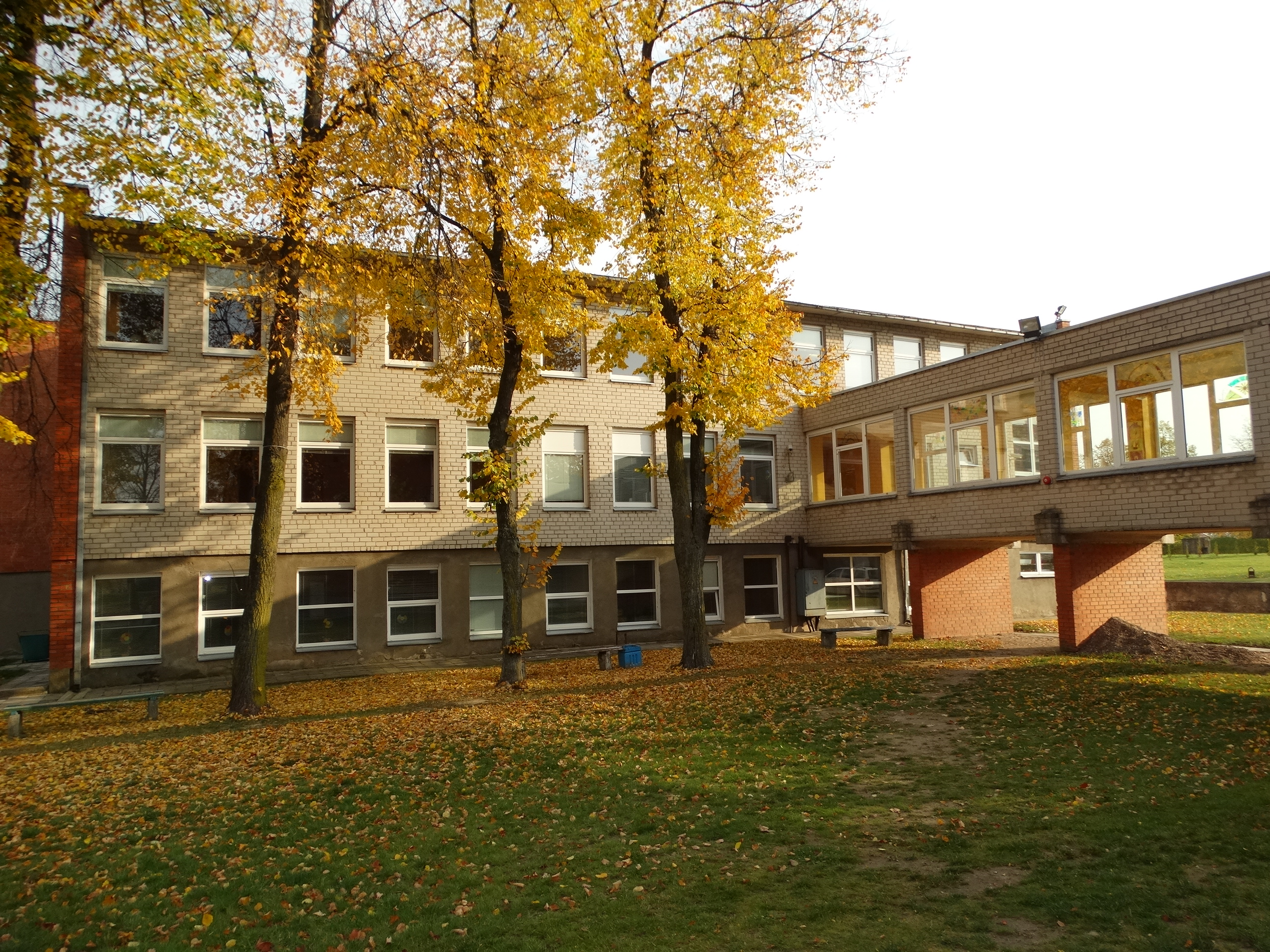
School in Virbalis

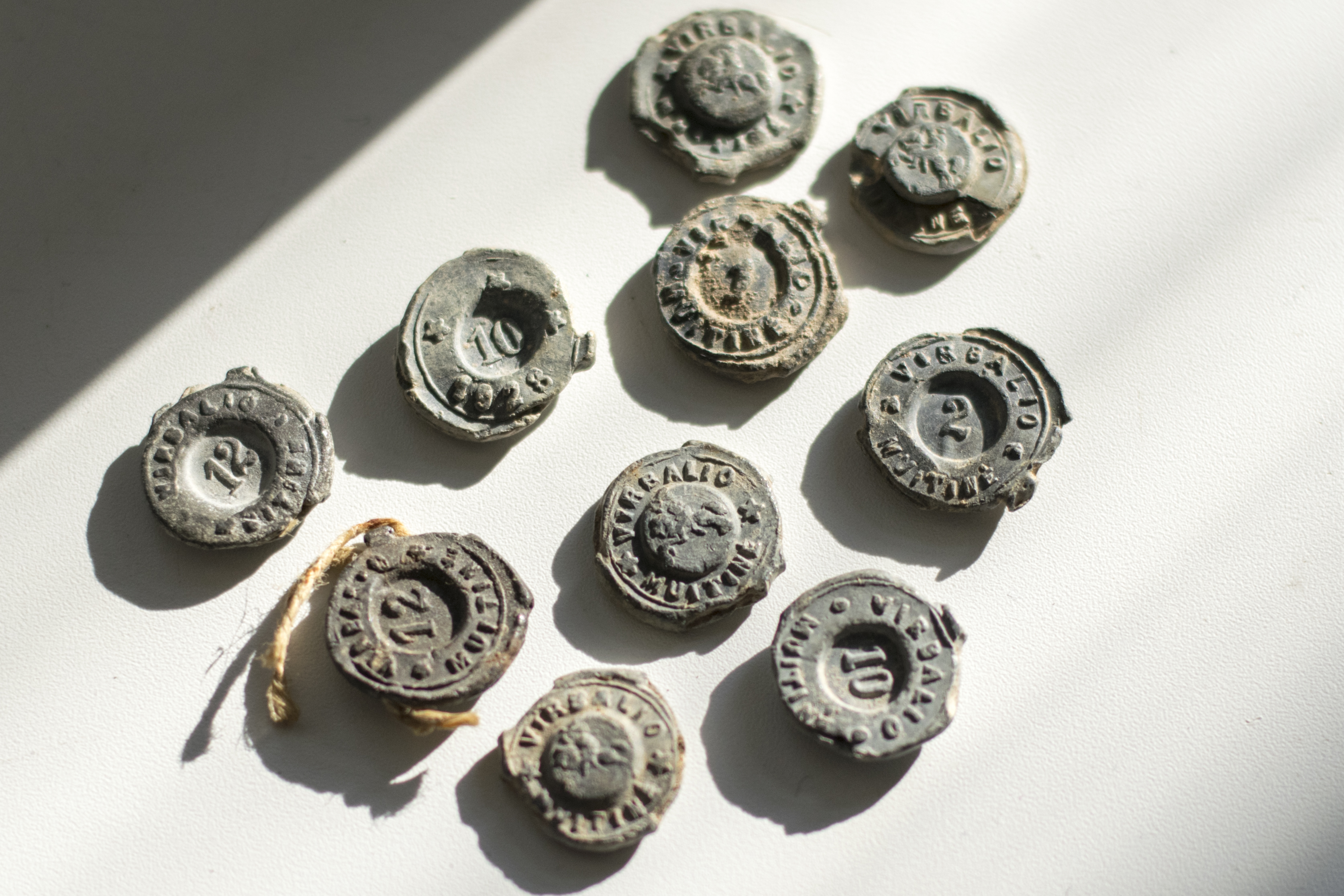
Former seals of the Virbalis railway station with Coat of arms of Lithuania
