= Pajevonys Eldership =

Eldership of Lithuania

The Pajevonys Eldership (Lithuanian: Pajevonio seniūnija) is an eldership of Lithuania, located in the Vilkaviškis District Municipality. In 2021 its population was 1104.
