= Kybartai =

Town in Suvaljika Region, Lithuania

- City
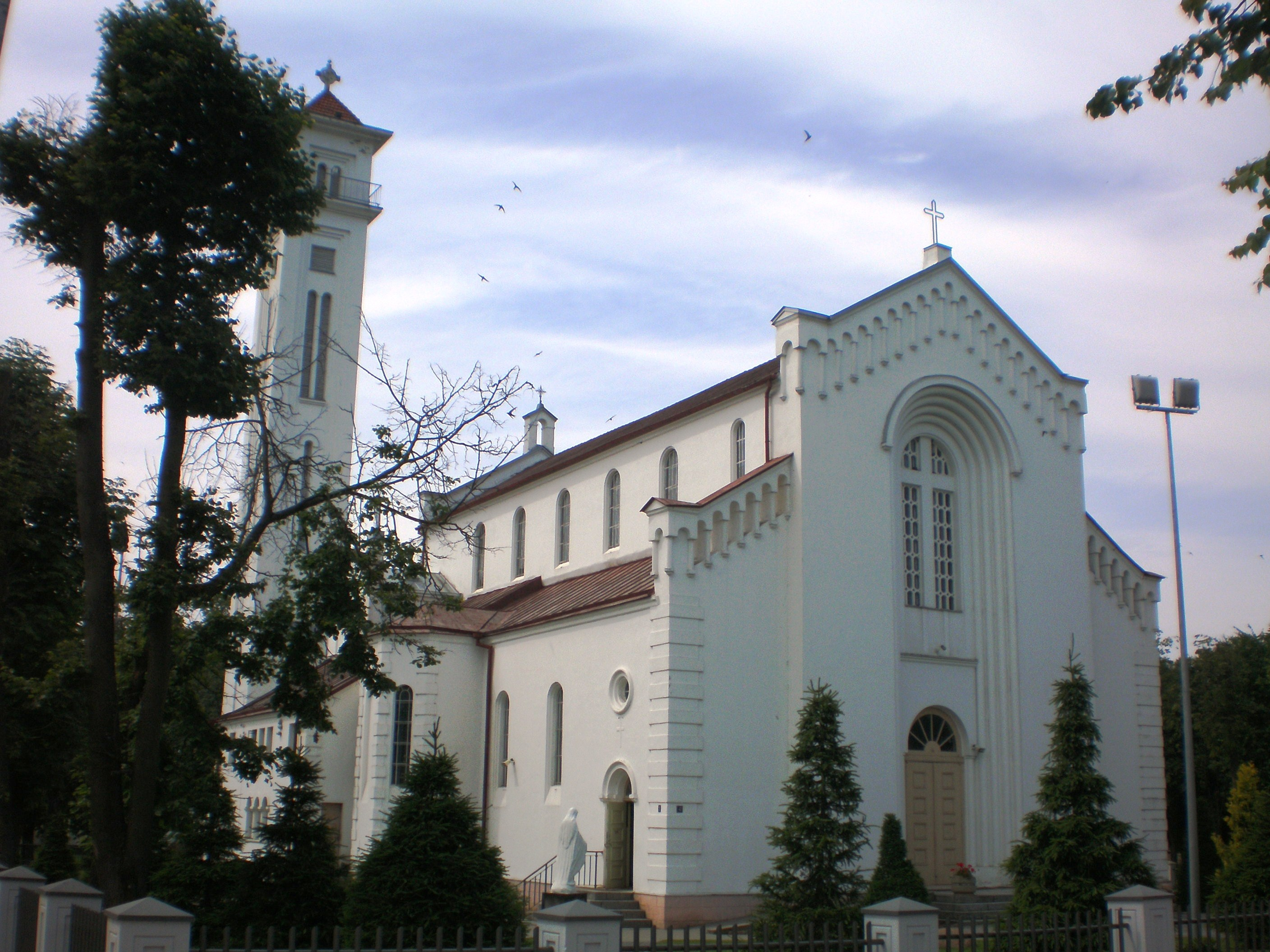
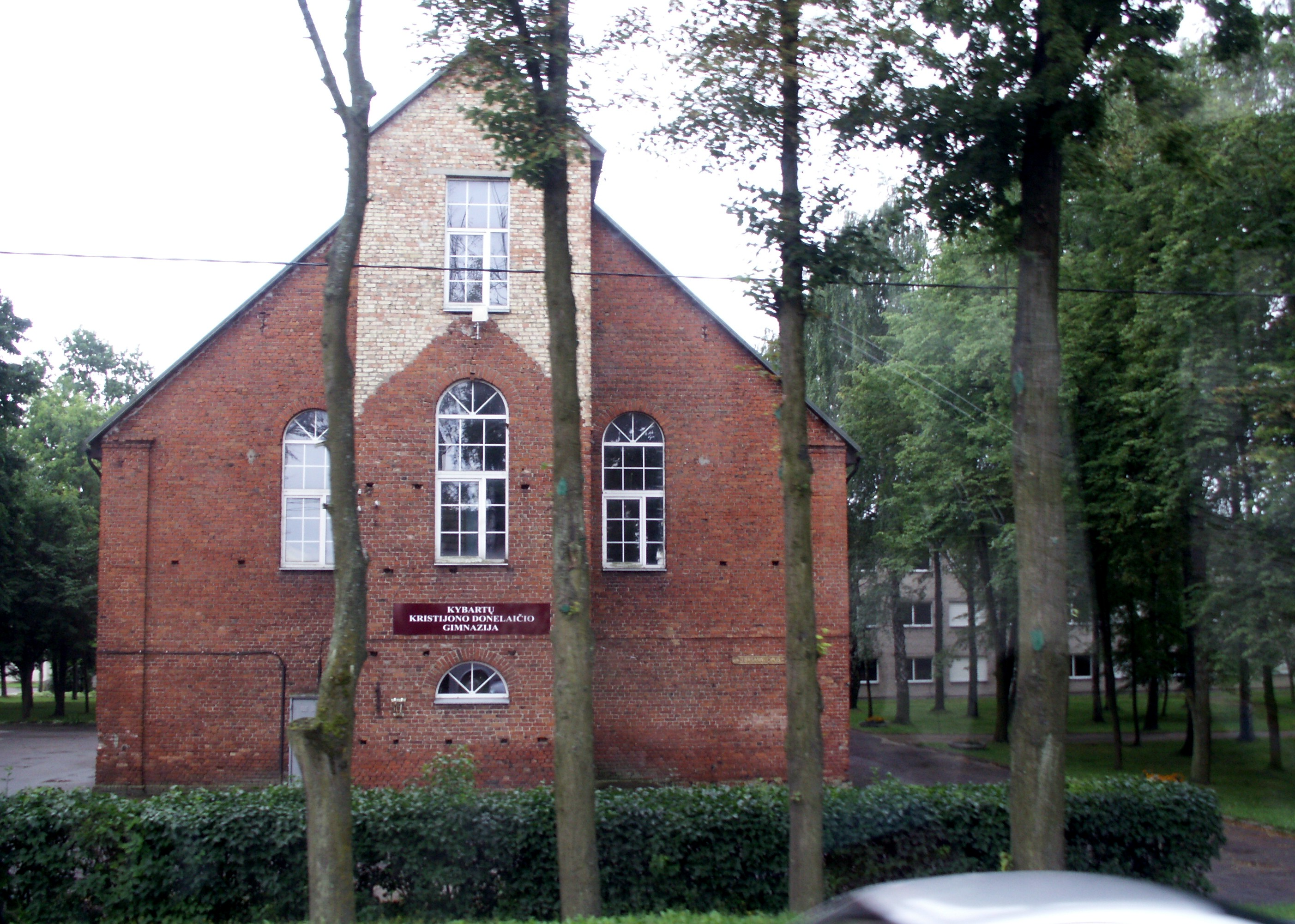
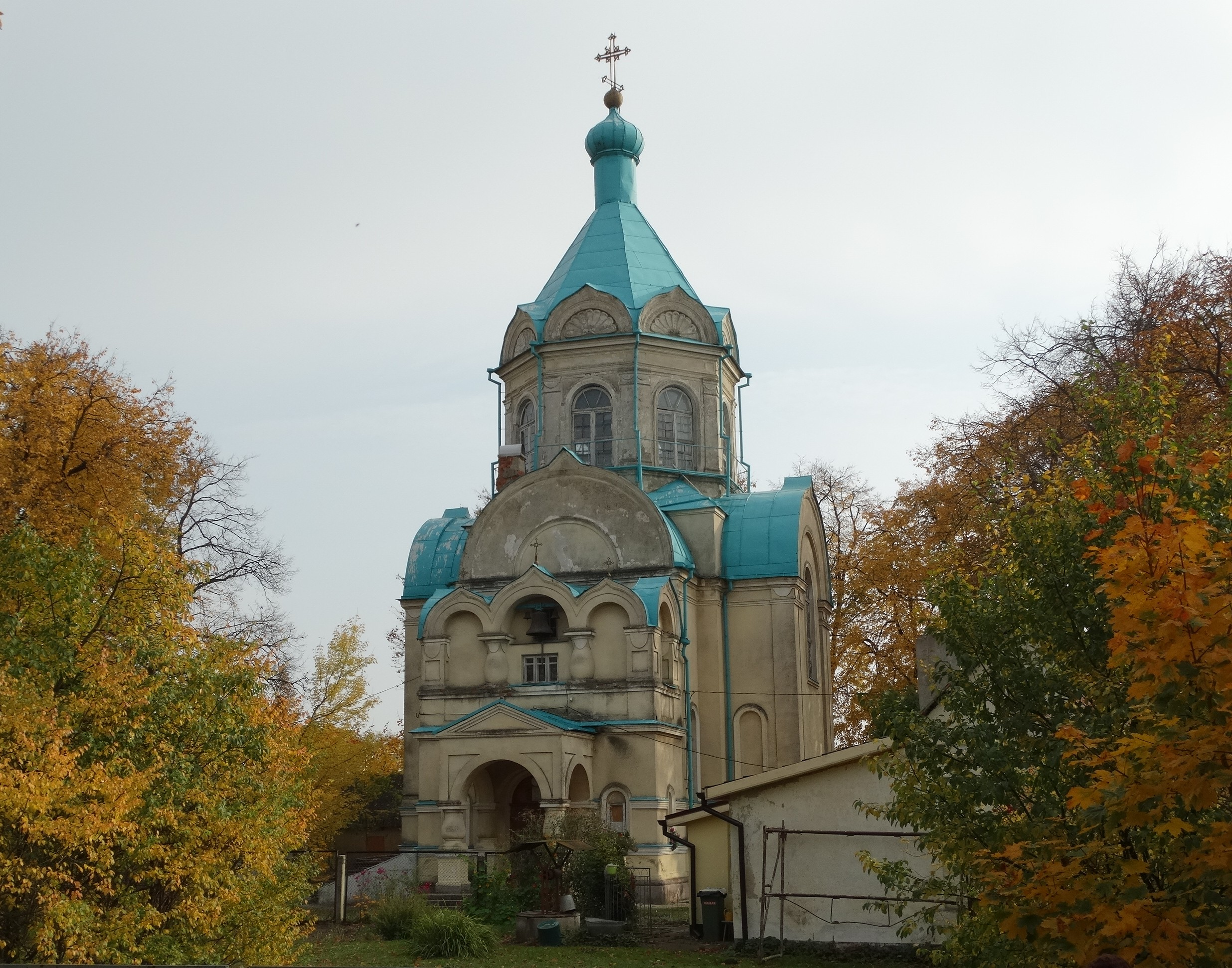
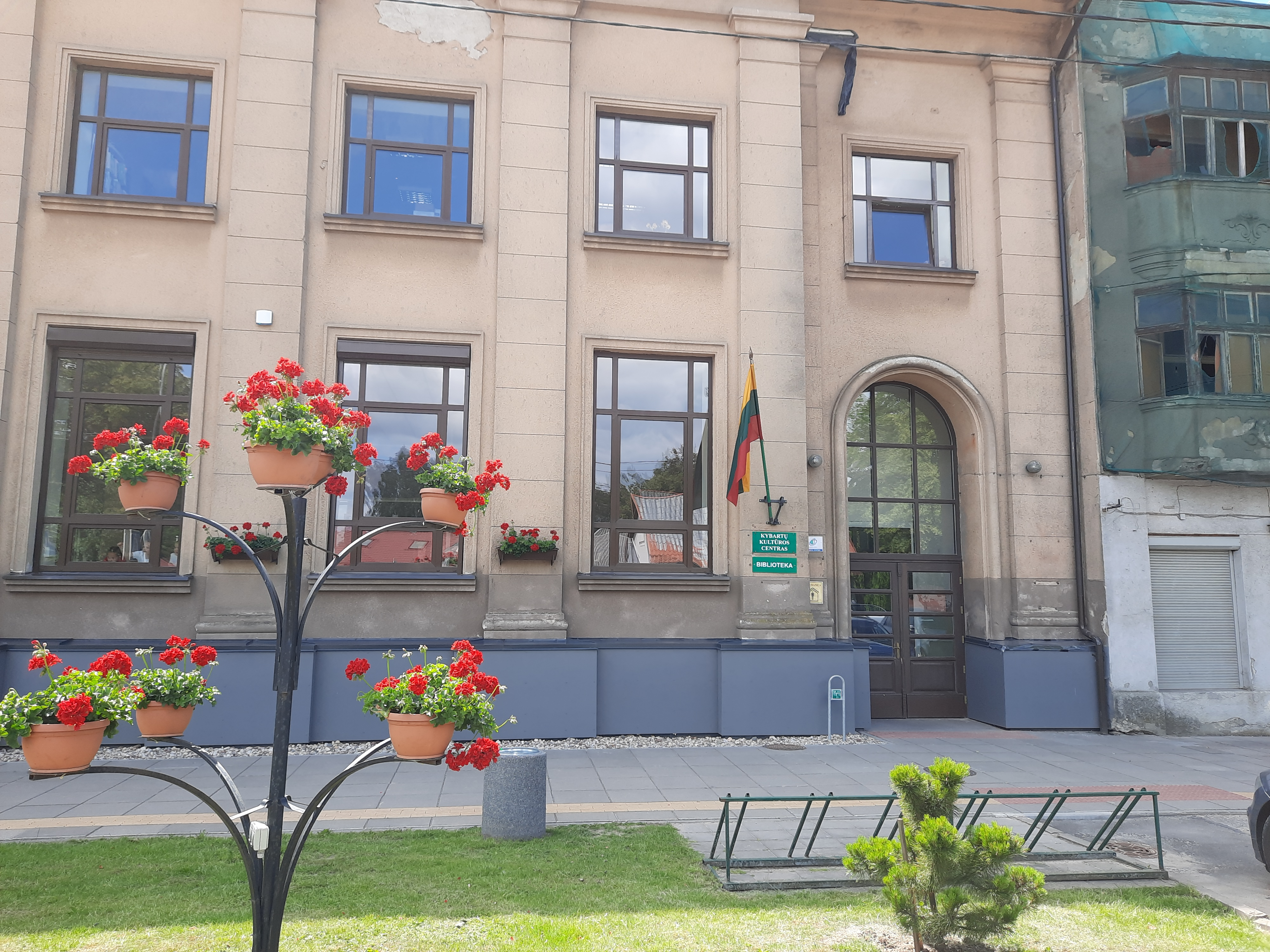
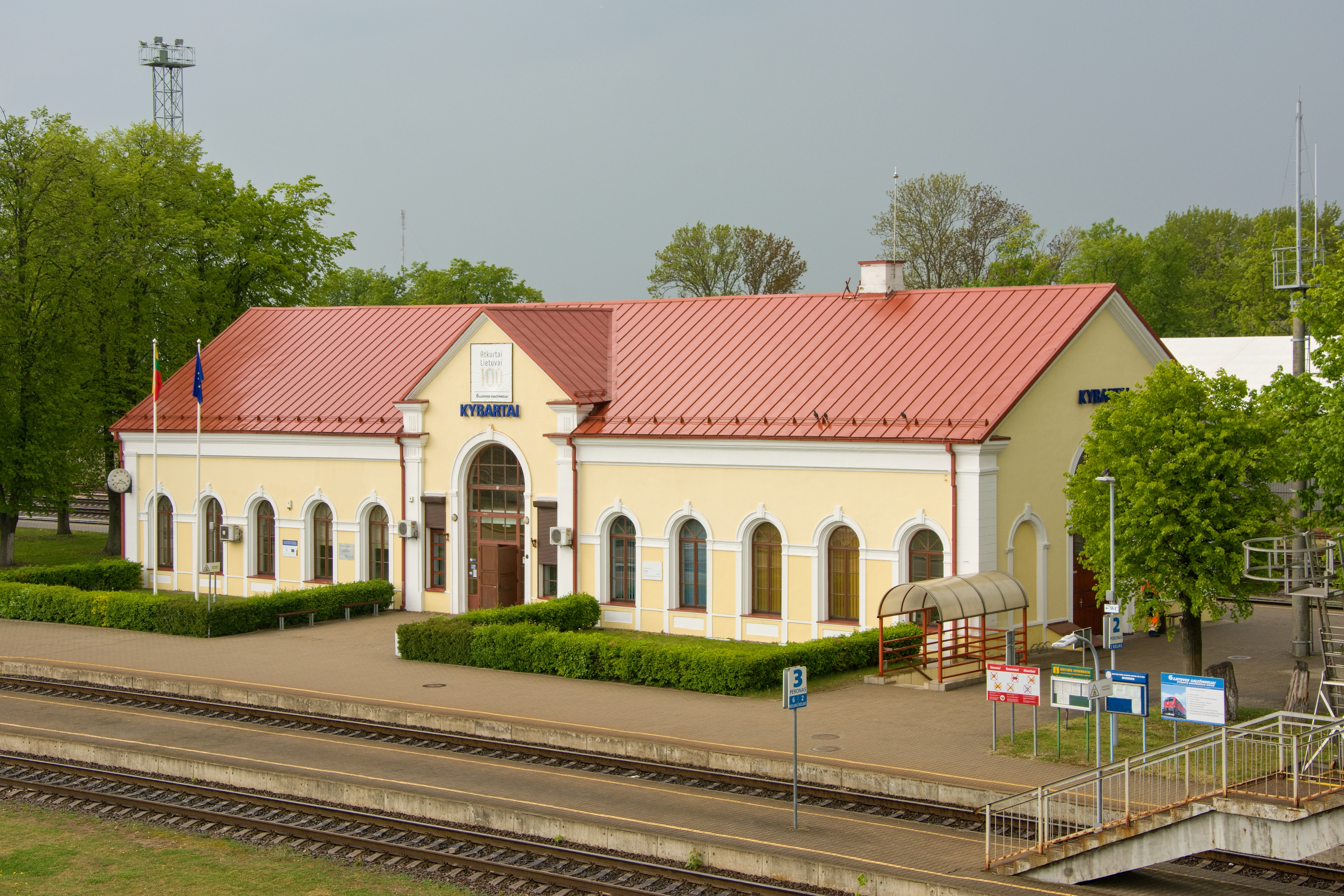
- From top, left to right: Eucharistic Saviour Church; Donelaitis gymnasium; Orthodox church; Cultural center; Train station

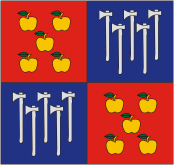
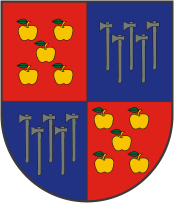
- Flag Coat of arms

- Location of Kybartai
- Coordinates: 54°37′20″N 22°46′0″E
- Country: Lithuania
- Ethnographic region: Suvalkija
- County: Marijampolė County
- Municipality: Vilkaviškis district municipality
- Eldership: Kybartai eldership
- Capital of: Kybartai eldership
- First mentioned: 1561
- Granted city rights: 1856

Population (2023)
  - Total: 4,879
- Time zone: UTC+2 (EET)
  - Summer (DST): UTC+3 (EEST)

Kybartai (Note: ; Polish: Kibarty, German: Kibarten, Yiddish: קיבאַרט, Russian: Кибартай) is a town in Marijampolė County, Vilkaviškis District Municipality in southwestern Lithuania. It is located 20 km (12 mi) west of Vilkaviškis and is on the border with Russia's Kaliningrad Oblast.

== History ==
Kybartai was founded during the reign of Sigismund I the Old by the colonization efforts of his wife, Queen Bona Sforza. In 1561, it was listed in the land register of Jurbarkas and Virbalis.

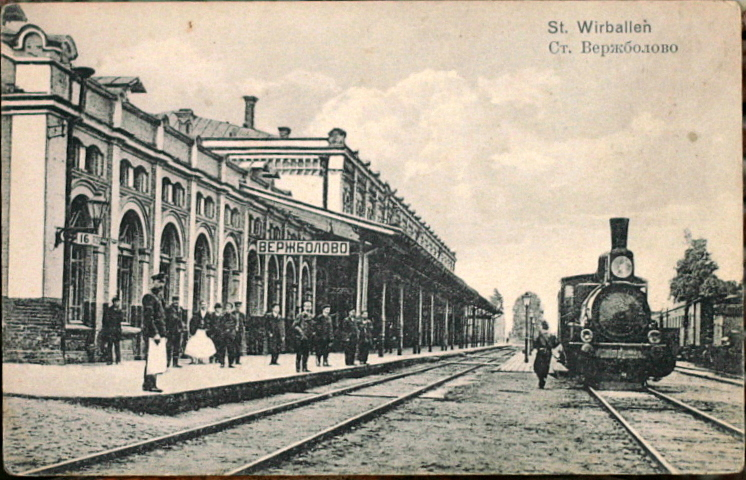
Verzhbolovo railway station in Kybartai about 1900

When a branch of the Saint Petersburg–Warsaw Railway was built from Vilnius to the Prussian border in 1861, where it was linked to the Prussian Eastern Railway, the Russian border station near the village of Kybartai was named after the neighbouring town of Verzhbolovo (Вержболово; Lithuanian: Virbalis, German: Wirballen). Meanwhile, Kybartai has become a town larger than Virbalis and the current Lithuanian border station is also called Kybartai. The German station of the Prussian Eastern Railway on the western side of the frontier was Eydtkuhnen (Lithuanian: Eitkūnai); today it is a Russian border station called Chernyshevskoye (Russian: Чернышевское).

In 1914, Kybartai had 10,000 inhabitants. The town was destroyed in World War I, but soon recovered and grew again. In 1919 and 1924, Kybartai was granted town rights and privileges. Small businesses began to set up. In 1919, the Žiburys Society founded a secondary school (later to become a gymnasium). Lithuanian, German, and Jewish schools and folk universities were established.

In 1919, the first football club in Lithuania, FK Sveikata, was founded. In 1923, the town recorded a population of 6000. From 1927 to 1928, the Eucharistic Saviour Church was built based on a design by the architect Vytautas Landsbergis-Žemkalnis.

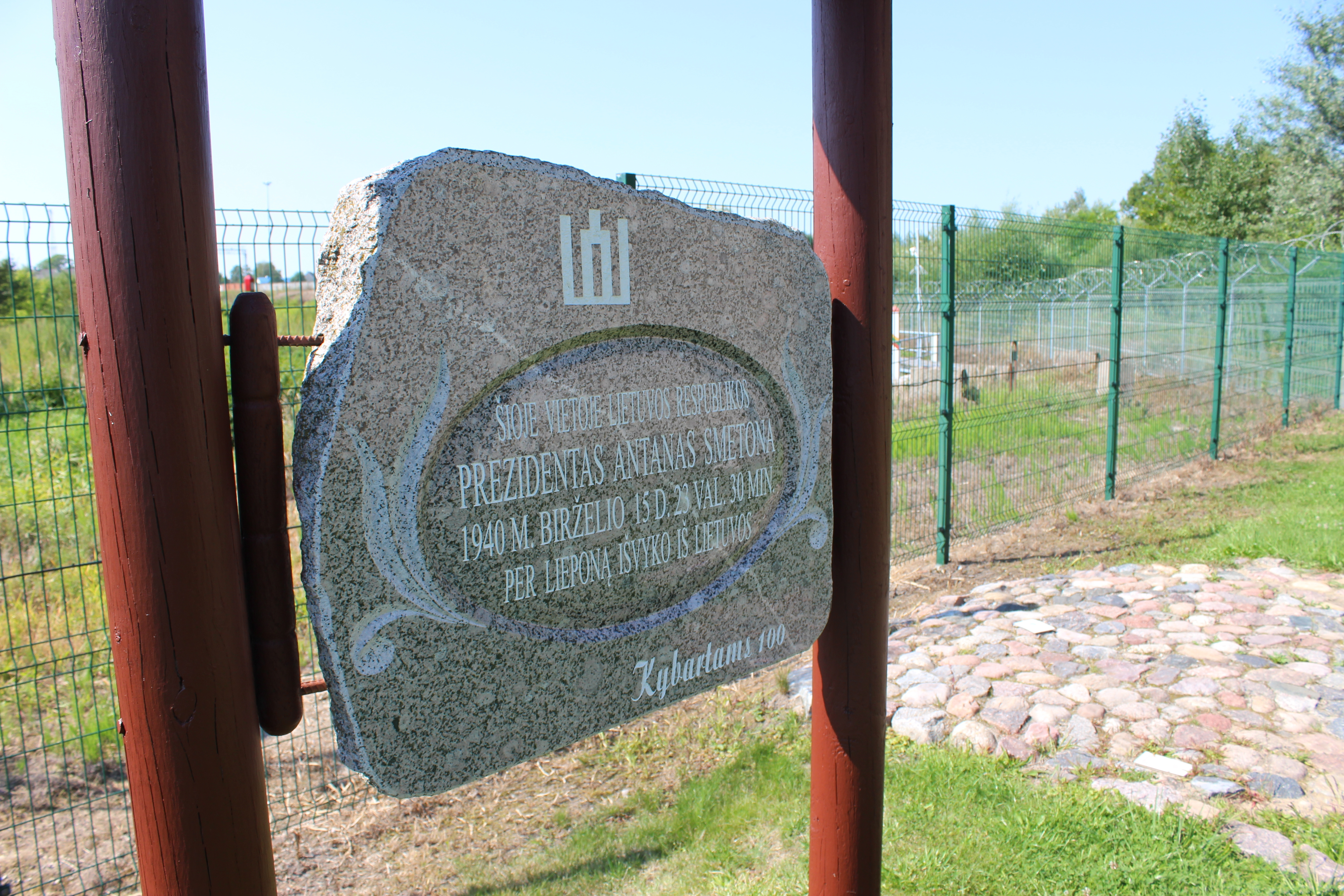
Memorial of Smetona's crossing.

Kybartai was the last place where President Antanas Smetona stayed in Lithuania. Late on the evening of June 15, 1940, when the Soviet Army invaded Lithuania, President Smetona fled from Kybartai to Germany after crossing Liepona Creek. On June 23, 1940, the Kybartai Acts were signed in Bern, but they were retroactively dated June 15, supposedly in Kybartai, marking the formal transfer of power to the so-called Provisional Government of Lithuania when Lithuania was occupied by the Soviet Army.

During World War II, Kybartai was again severely devastated (only 100 inhabitants remained). On June 30, 1941, an Einsatzgruppe of Germans and a few Lithuanian policemen perpetrated a mass execution of the local Jewish population: 106 to 116 men were murdered in a gravel pit. From July to autumn 1941, other Jews from the town were executed with hundreds of victims from the nearby town of Virbalis at another execution site.

In 1945, Kybartai Secondary School was founded, and in 1964 it was named after Kristijonas Donelaitis.

== Climate ==
Climate data for Kybartai (1991–2020 normals)
Month	Jan	Feb	Mar	Apr	May	Jun	Jul	Aug	Sep	Oct	Nov	Dec	Year
Mean daily maximum °C (°F)	0.1 (32.2)	0.9 (33.6)	5.5 (41.9)	13.0 (55.4)	18.6 (65.5)	21.5 (70.7)	23.9 (75.0)	23.5 (74.3)	18.2 (64.8)	11.6 (52.9)	5.7 (42.3)	1.7 (35.1)	12.0 (53.6)
Daily mean °C (°F)	−2.4 (27.7)	−1.8 (28.8)	1.6 (34.9)	7.8 (46.0)	13.0 (55.4)	16.3 (61.3)	18.5 (65.3)	18.0 (64.4)	13.3 (55.9)	7.9 (46.2)	3.2 (37.8)	−0.6 (30.9)	7.9 (46.2)
Mean daily minimum °C (°F)	−3.2 (26.2)	−3.1 (26.4)	−0.9 (30.4)	3.1 (37.6)	7.6 (45.7)	11.7 (53.1)	14.8 (58.6)	14.7 (58.5)	10.8 (51.4)	6.1 (43.0)	2.3 (36.1)	−1.1 (30.0)	5.2 (41.4)
Average precipitation mm (inches)	42 (1.7)	37 (1.5)	34 (1.3)	34 (1.3)	47 (1.9)	67 (2.6)	82 (3.2)	67 (2.6)	50 (2.0)	54 (2.1)	41 (1.6)	43 (1.7)	598 (23.5)
Average relative humidity (%)	86	84	79	71	70	74	76	76	80	84	88	88	80
Source: Lithuanian Hydrometeorological Service

== People born in Kybartai ==
- Isaac Ilyich Levitan (Russian: Исаак Ильич Левитан, 1860–1900), Russian landscape painter
- Emil Młynarski (1870–1935), Polish composer
- Harald Serafin (born 1931), Austrian singer
- Inga Valinskienė (born 1966), Lithuanian singer and politician
- Maria Znamierowska-Prüfferowa (1898–1990), Polish ethnographer
