= Klausučiai Eldership =

Eldership of Lithuania

The Klausučiai Eldership (Lithuanian: Klausučių seniūnija) is an eldership of Lithuania, located in the Vilkaviškis District Municipality. In 2021 its population was 2354.
