= Pilviškiai Eldership =

Eldership of Lithuania

The Pilviškiai Eldership (Lithuanian: Pilviškių seniūnija) is an eldership of Lithuania, located in the Vilkaviškis District Municipality. In 2021 its population was 3375.
