= Kybartai railway station =

Railway station in Lithuania

Kybartai
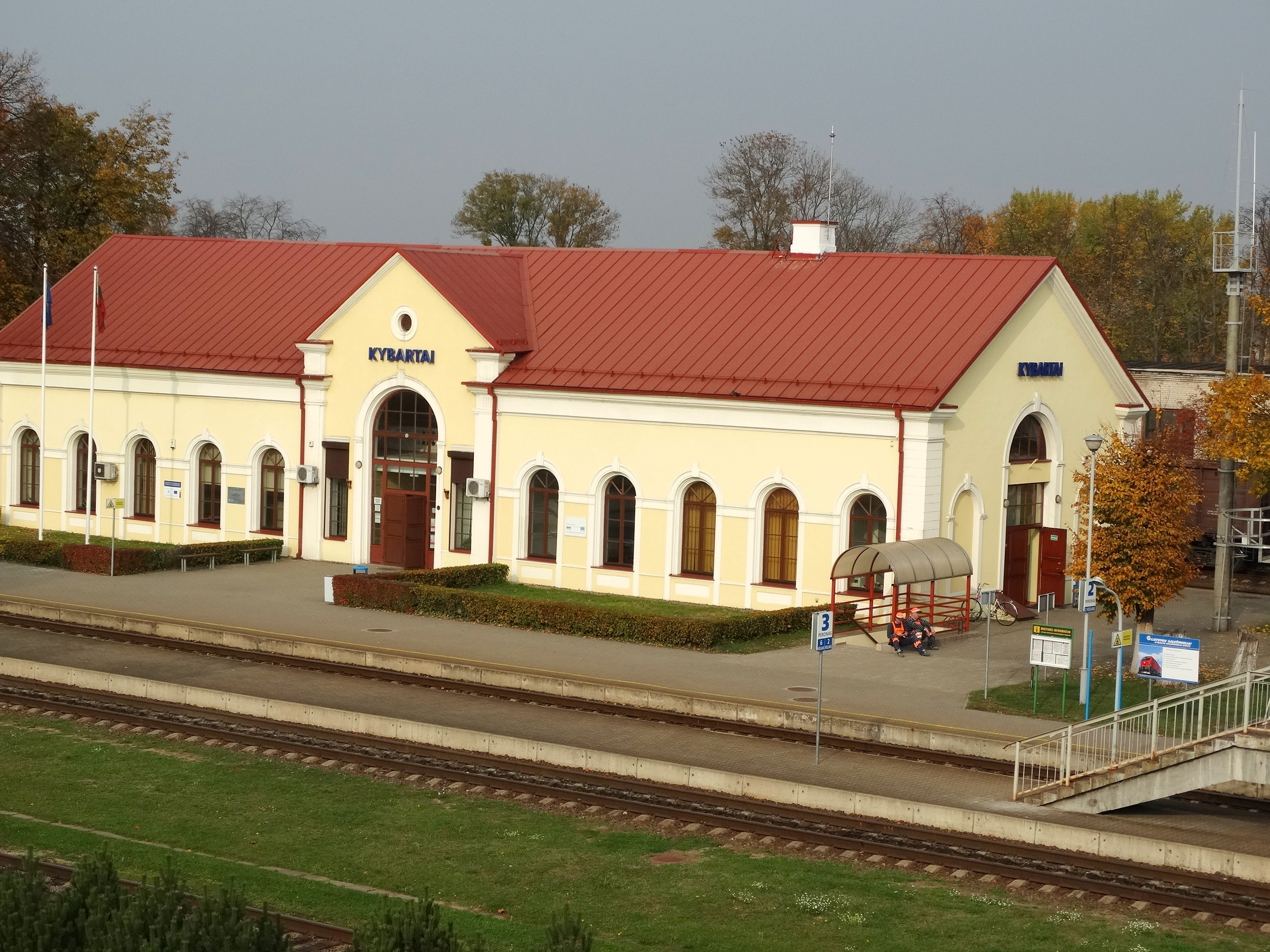
- Kybartai station in 2014

General information
- Location: Kudirkos Naumiesčio g. 4, Kybartai; 70414 Vilkaviškio r. Lithuania
- Coordinates: 54°38′25″N 22°45′33″E
- Line: Kaunas–Kybartai
- Train operators: Lietuvos Geležinkeliai (LTG)

Services
Preceding station	LTG Link	Following station
Terminus	Kaunas–Kybartai	Alvitas towards Kaunas
Location
- Location within Lithuania

Kybartai railway station (Lithuanian: Kybartų geležinkelio stotis), until 1964 known as Virbalis railway station (Lithuanian: Virbalio geležinkelio stotis; German: Bahnhof Wirballen; Russian: Станція Вержболово), is a railway station in the town of Kybartai in southwestern Lithuania. Located on the Kaunas–Kybartai railway line, the station is a border station on the border between Russia and Lithuania, located on the Lithuanian side, with the neighbouring Chernyshevskoye railway station located 2 km (1.2 mi) to the west on the Russian side.

Originally located in Congress Poland of the Russian Empire, the station opened in 1861 as a part of the railway connection between Saint Petersburg, Königsberg and Berlin. The station became an important border station between the Russian and German Empires, where passengers travelling between the Russian capital and Western Europe had to change trains and freight had to be transloaded due to the different track gauges.

== History ==
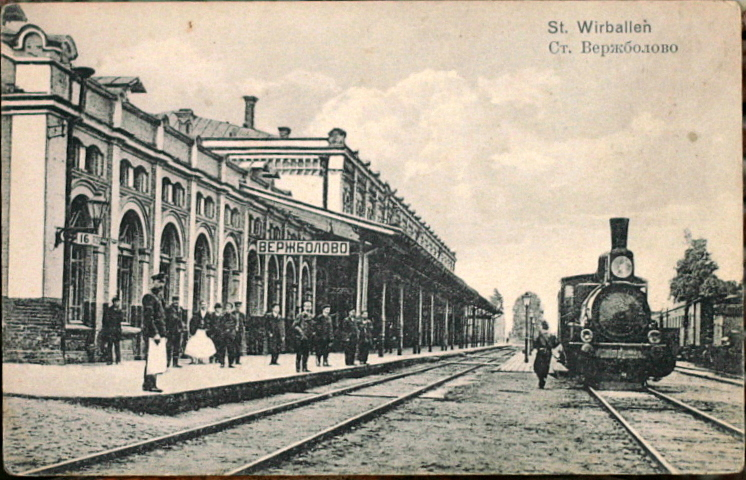
Wirballen station, c. 1900.

In 1851, the Imperial Government of Russia decided to build a railway line between Saint Petersburg and Warsaw which was completed in 1862. A separate branch line from Lentvaris, located on the Saint Petersburg–Warsaw railway just west of Vilnius, to the Prussian border, where it would connect with the Prussian Eastern Railway, was to connect Saint Petersburg with Western Europe via Königsberg and Berlin.

Construction of the branch line between Lentvaris via Kaunas to the border station at the Russian-Prussian border was started in the spring of 1859. The border station was located in the present town of Kybartai but as this was then just a small village, the railway station was named after the town of Virbalis, located 5 km (3.1 mi) to the east. Passenger traffic from Kaunas began on 11 April 1861 and from Vilnius (and thus from Saint Petersburg) on 15 March 1862.

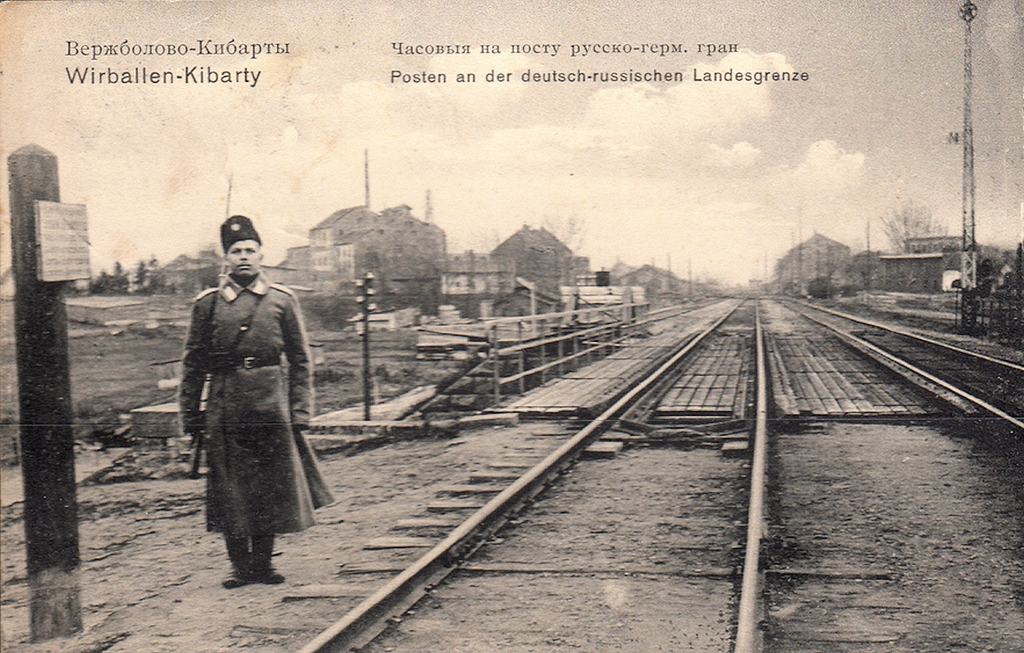
Border guard at the railway bridge across the Liepona river, which formed the border between Russia and Germany (1910).

The standard track gauge used in Western and Central Europe and the broad track gauge used in the Russian Empire met at the border. The roughly 2 km (1.2 mi) long railway line across the border river Liepona between Virbalis and the German border station in neighboring Eydtkuhnen in East Prussia had one track for standard gauge and one track for broad gauge.

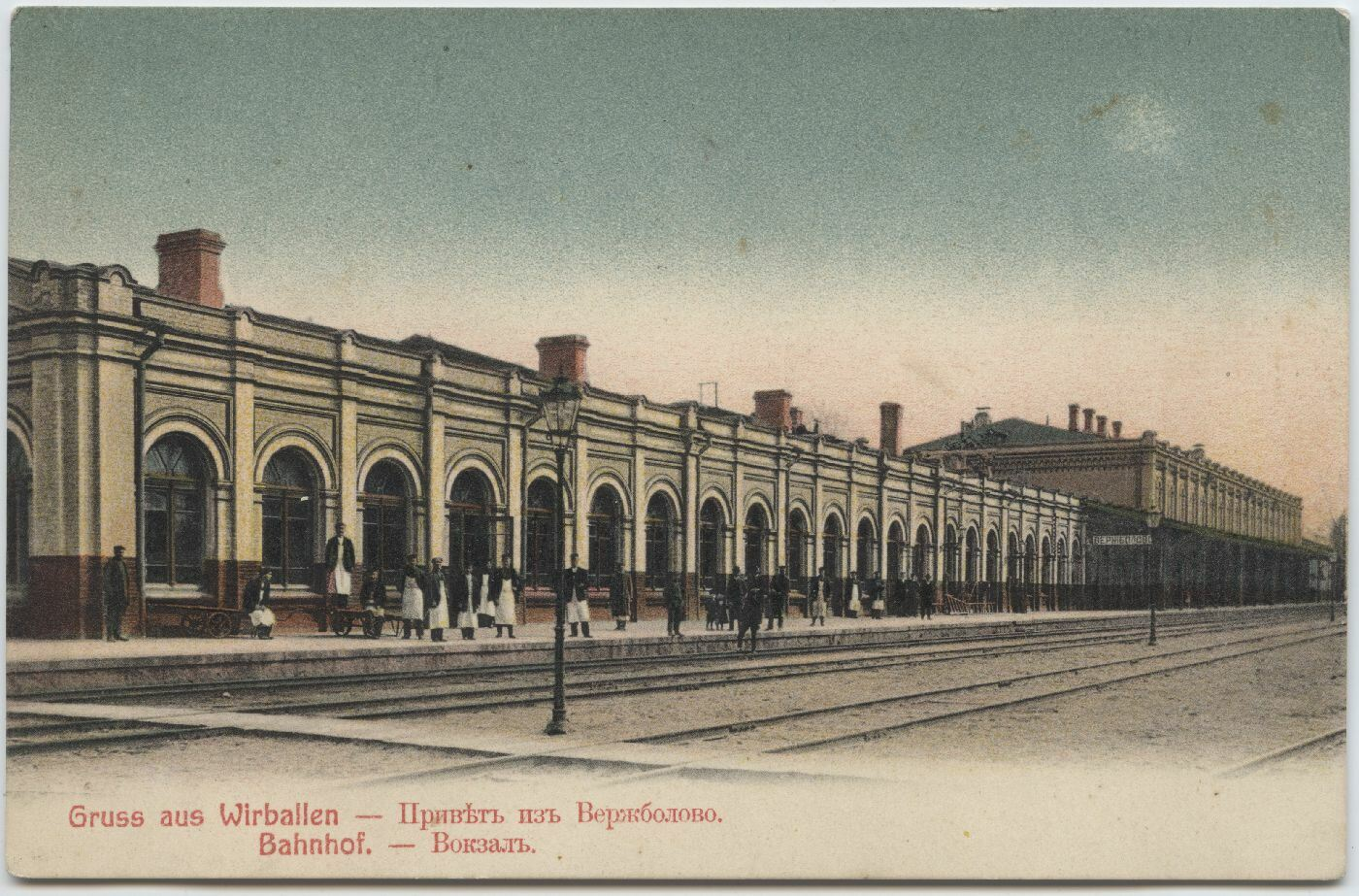
The station building c. 1909.

Because all passengers, including the Emperor and his family, had to change trains here due to the break of gauge when they travelled from Western Europe to Russia by train, the station received a particularly stately station building.

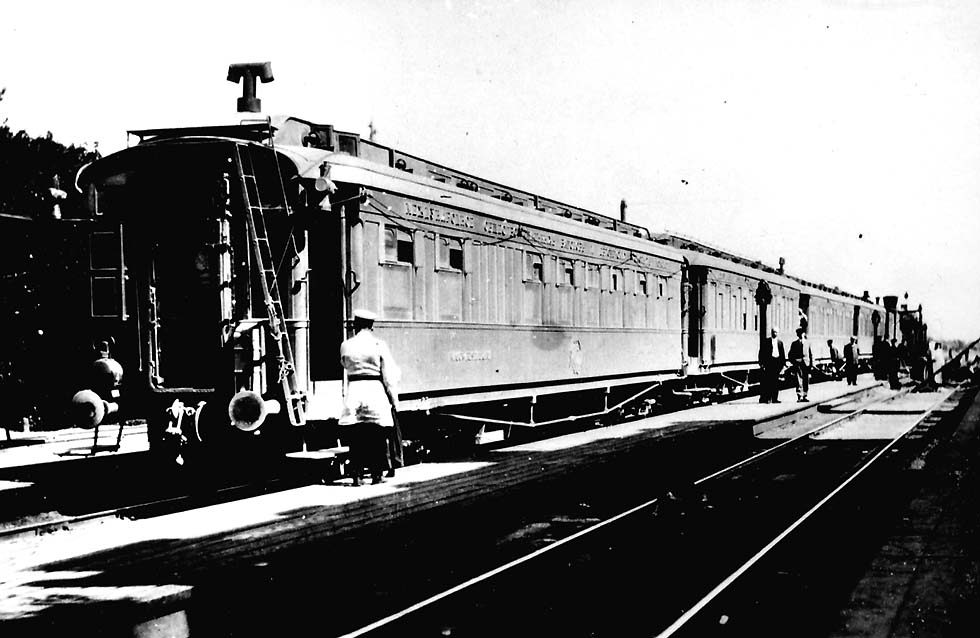
Broad gauge railway carriages of the Nord Express at Wirballen station in 1903.

As gauge change of railway vehicles was not technically possible at the time, passengers — e.g. of the famous Nord Express luxury train coming from Paris and Berlin — had to change over from standard gauge to broad gauge railway carriages at the border to continue their voyage to Saint Petersburg. Crossing the Russian-German border took nearly an hour. The eastbound train crossed the border on the standard gauge track to Wirballen, where passengers transferred to similar but broad-gauge rolling stock, leaving on the other side of the platform to continue their journey towards Saint Petersburg. The same interchange for passengers travelling in the opposite direction was provided on the German side of the border in Eydtkuhnen. After the passengers had disembarked, the trains were driven back to the other side of the border.

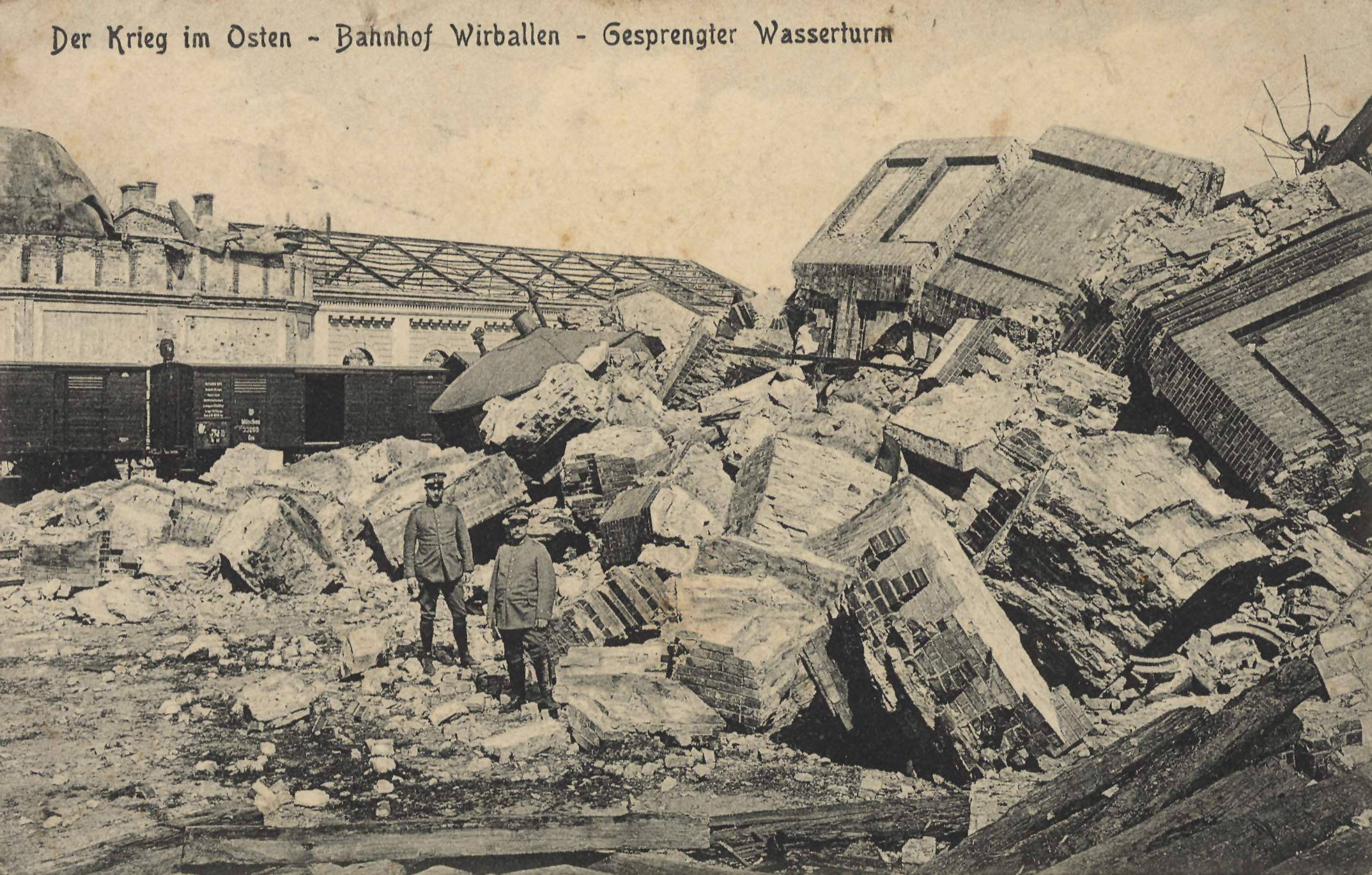
Destroyed water tower at Virbalis station in 1918.

On 15 August 1914, the station was the site of the Battle of Virbalis (Russian: Битва у Вержболово), the first battle of the Eastern Front and one of the largest battles of the first 16 days of World War I. German troops wanted to destroy the station to slow down the mobilization of the Russian troops, but they could not take it and had to retreat.

== Services ==
Map of the Lithuanian railway network

The station is served by trains between Kybartai and Kaunas operated by LTG Link which run a few times a day.

== See also ==
- List of railway stations in Lithuania
- Rail transport in Lithuania
- History of rail transport in Lithuania
- Transport in Lithuania
