= Gižai Eldership =

Eldership of Lithuania

The Gižai Eldership (Lithuanian: Gižų seniūnija) is an eldership of Lithuania, located in the Vilkaviškis District Municipality. In 2021 its population was 854.
