= Battle of Virbalis =

1914 battle in World War I

- Part of the Eastern Front of World War I
Date	15 August [O.S. 2 August] 1914
Location	Virbalis, Russian Empire (now Lithuania)
Result	Russian victory

Belligerents
Russian Empire	German Empire

Commanders and leaders
Alexander Granikov; Huseyn Khan Nakhchivanski	Unknown

Units involved
Volga 109th Infantry Regiment	Unknown

Strength
2,500	10,000

Casualties and losses
Unknown	Heavy (Note: The cavalry alone killed 200 and captured 17 Germans)

Battle of Virbalis (Russian: Битва у Вержболово), was one of the largest battles of the first 16 days of the World War I, during which the parties were preparing to conduct full-scale operations.

10,000 German troops attacked 2,500 Russians on the station, the Germans wanted to destroy the train station to slow down the mobilization of the Russians, but they could not take it and had to retreat. It is the first battle of the Eastern Front.
