= Prussian Eastern Railway =

Railway line in German Empire

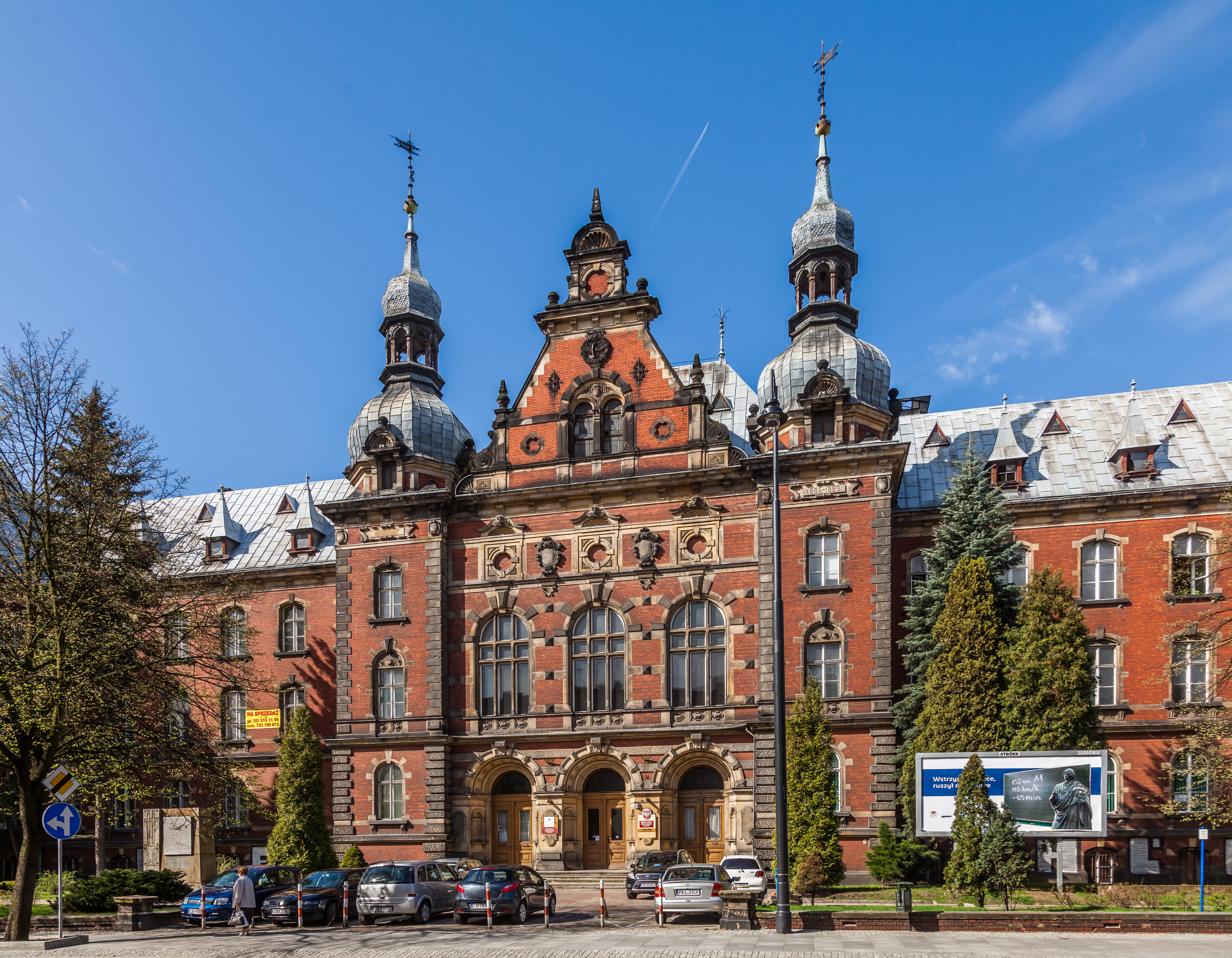
- Headquarters of the Prussian Eastern Railway in Bydgoszcz, Poland

Overview
- Native name: Preußische Ostbahn
- Owner: DB Netz (Germany); PKP Polskie Linie Kolejowe (Poland); Russian Railways (Russia)
- Line number: 6006 (Berlin–Strausberg); 6078 (Berlin–Kostrzyn); 203 (Kostrzyn–Tczew); 9 (Tczew–Malbork); 204 (Malbork–Mamonovo)
- Locale: Kingdom of Prussia
- Termini: Berlin; Eydtkuhnen (Chernyshevskoye)

Service
- Route number: 200.5 (Berlin–Strausberg); 209.26 (Berlin–Kostrzyn); 345 (Kostrzyn–Piła); 426 (Piła Gł–Tczew); 400& (Tczew–Malbork); 505 (Malbork–Braniewo)
- Operator(s): S-Bahn Berlin; Niederbarnimer Eisenbahn; Polregio; TLK; Kaliningrad Railway (RZhD)

Technical
- Line length: 724.3 km (450.1 mi)
- Track gauge: 1,435 mm (4 ft 8 1/2 in) standard gauge (Berlin–Kaliningrad); 1,520 mm (4 ft 11 27/32 in) Russian gauge (Braniewo–Kybartai)
- Electrification: (Berlin S-Bahn) 750 V DC; (Tczew–Malbork) 3 kV; (Berlin main line) 15 kV/16.7 Hz AC catenary
- Operating speed: 100km/h (max)

The Prussian Eastern Railway (German: Preußische Ostbahn) was a railway in the Kingdom of Prussia and later Germany until 1918. Its main route, approximately 740 kilometers (460 mi) long, connected the capital, Berlin, with the cities of Danzig (now Gdańsk, Poland) and Königsberg (now Kaliningrad, Russia). At Eydtkuhnen (now Chernyshevskoye, Russia) it reached the German Empire's border with the Russian Empire. The first part of the line opened in 1851, reaching Eydtkuhnen in 1860. By March 1880 the total route length reached 2,210 kilometers (1,370 mi), with a main parallel route in the south via Bromberg (now Bydgoszcz, Poland) and Thorn (now Toruń, Poland) to Insterburg (now Chernyakhovsk, Russia). The lines were the first part of the later Prussian State Railways (German: Preußische Staatseisenbahnen).

== History ==
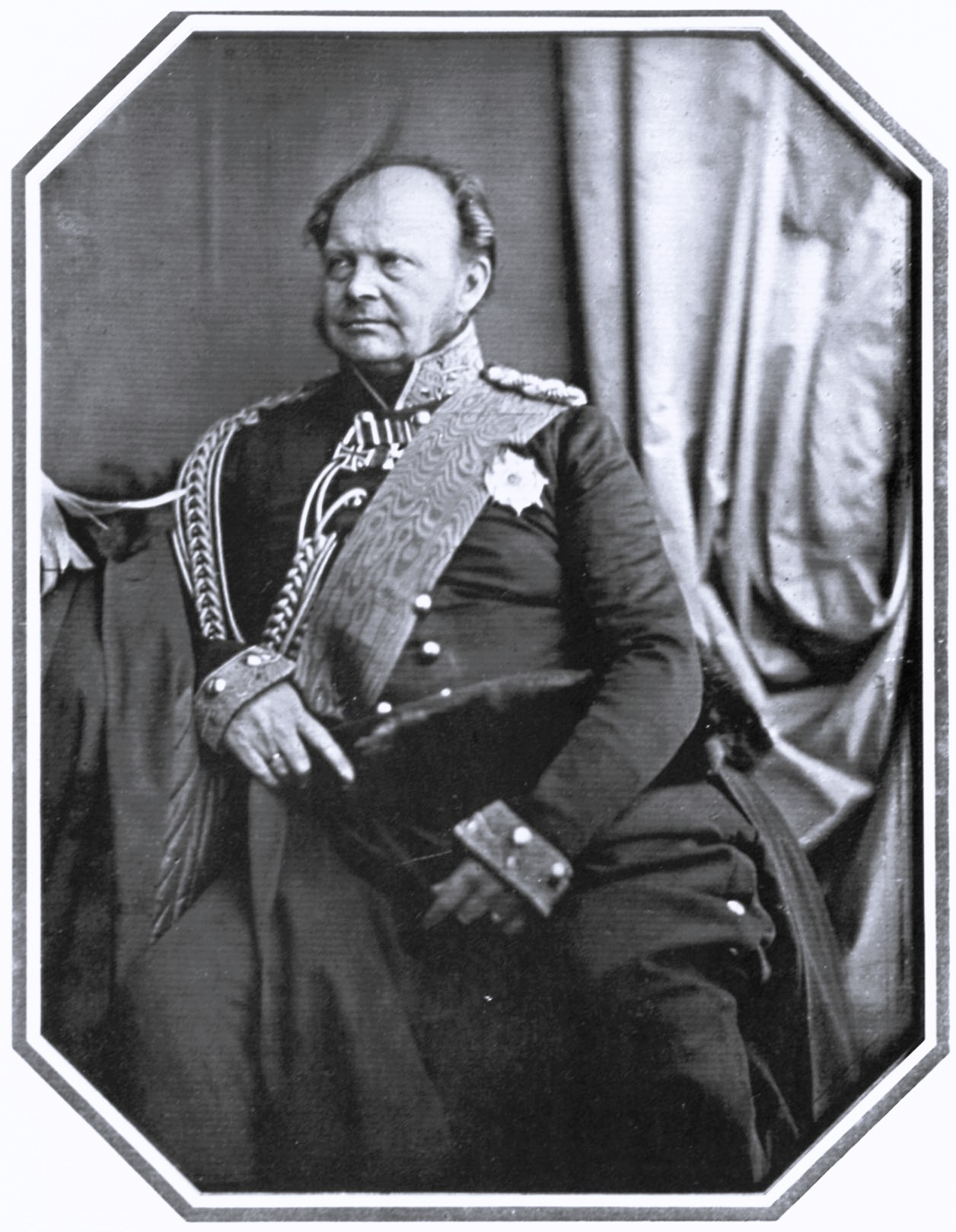
Frederick William IV

From about 1840, the Prussian military urgently sought a railway connection to the Russian border for strategic reasons. The railway was also seen from the early years as a means of developing the underdeveloped areas of East Prussia and Pomerania. A lack of interest from the private sector led King Frederick William IV to initiate in 1845 preparatory work for the construction of the Eastern Railway. Construction was stopped, as the members of the provincial diet (Provinziallandtag) of East Prussia refused consent for the king to borrow for the project. This vote was confirmed in the United Diet (Vereinigter Landtag), the first parliamentary body covering all of Prussia, which was convened in April 1847 and subsequently dissolved. Members voted by a two-thirds majority against authorising a government loan for the Eastern Railway project.

Only the events of the March Revolution of 1848 and the appointment of banker August von der Heydt as the Prussian Minister of Commerce and Industry—and therefore responsible for railways—led to progress on the issue. In August 1849, Von der Heydt laid before the diet a draft law for the construction of the Eastern Railway, which was adopted on 7 December 1849.

Previously, on 5 November 1849, the Railway division of the Eastern Railway (Königliche Direktion der Ostbahn) had been established in Bromberg. Minister von der Heydt then initiated the restart of the construction of the Eastern Railway with funds from the "Railway Fund".

=== Construction of the main line ===
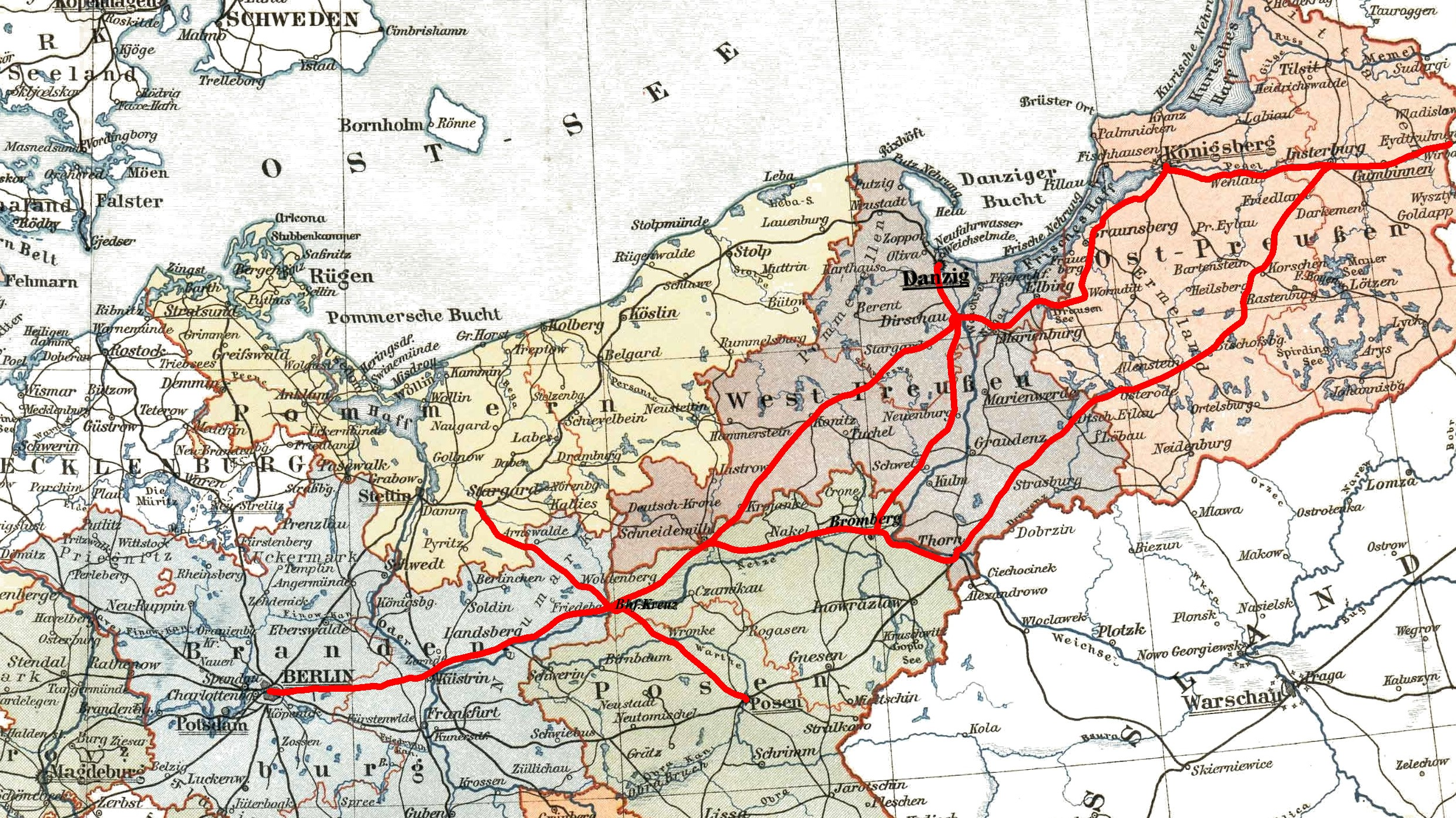
Main routes of the Prussian Eastern Railway marked on map of 1905

In 1848, construction had already been completed of the main line of the private Stargard-Posen Railway Company (Stargard-Posener Eisenbahn), between Stargard and Posen. This line is now part of the Poznań–Szczecin railway. In the middle of the line near the village of Lukatz, a railway station was created at a junction of a line to Küstrin. From this same station, the first 145 km long section of the Eastern Railway was built via Schneidemühl to Bromberg; this was opened on 27 July 1851. The station near Lukatz was later called Kreuz (cross), which, from 1936, was the official name of the town. It became an important railway junction. It is now called Krzyż Wielkopolski in Polish. The continuation of the first section via Dirschau to Danzig (161 km) was completed on 6 August 1852. During this time, trains between Kreuz and Berlin ran via the Berlin-Stettin railway and the Stargard–Posen line.

Beyond the Nogat and Vistula rivers, the railway continued to be built from Marienburg via Elbing to Braunsberg (83.75 km); it was opened on 19 October 1852. It was extended to Königsberg (62 km) on 2 August 1853. After the completion of the railway bridges over the Vistula in September 1857 and over the Nogat on 12 October 1857, the 18 km long Dirschau–Malbork line was completed. At the same time, the 29 km long direct line from Frankfurt (Oder) via Lebus to Küstrin as well as the 105 km line from Küstrin via Landsberg an der Warthe to Kreuz was opened. Berlin was therefore reached by a shorter route via the Lower Silesian-Märkische Railway (Niederschlesisch-Märkische Eisenbahn-Gesellschaft, NME). The Prussian state railways acquired a stake in the NME and took over its management in 1850 and purchased the remaining shares of the railway in 1852.

In 1853, Edward Wiebe was the Director of the Railway division of the Eastern Railway in Bromberg. Already in the 1840s, he had been involved in planning the line and since 1849 he had been in the technical management of the Railway division of the Eastern Railway. One of his successors was Albert von Maybach (1863–1867), previously Chairman of the Board of the Upper Silesian Railway (Oberschlesische Eisenbahn).

On 1 October 1866, an 18 km of the line was opened towards Berlin from Küstrin to Gusow and, on 1 October 1867, the last 64 km section of the direct line between Berlin and Königsberg was opened from Gusow to Berlin East station (Berlin Ostbahnhof) via Strausberg.

The line was extended from Königsberg on 6 June 1860 to Insterburg via Gumbinnen, Trakehnen and Stalluponen and extended to Eydtkuhnen on the Russian frontier on 15 August 1860, a total distance of 153 km. Transloading and transfers took place at Eydtkuhnen or at the station across the border then called Virbalis in Lithuanian (German: Wirballen, Russian: Verzhbolovo, Вержболово, Polish: Wierzbałowo), now called Kybartai. Later the gauge-conversion of carriages on through trains to the broad gauge tracks of the Russian Railways was carried out there. In 1871, the 34 km shorter Schneidemühl–Konitz–Dirschau line was built parallel, bypassing Bromberg. After the completion of these sections work began with duplicating the line from Küstrin east. The route from Berlin to Kustrin however, was already duplicated. In addition, there were several sections of line built parallel with the main line over short sections.

In 1882, the Silesian station (Schlesischer Bahnhof) was opened as the new terminus for the line in Berlin and the old East Station was closed.

=== Importance to Prussia ===
Once completed to the east, the Eastern Railway line opened up the Prussian provinces from Berlin. Freight traffic exceeded projections by several times. This was mostly made up of agricultural products such as livestock, grain and vegetables. The disruption of river traffic by the frequent low water levels in the Oder, Vistula and Warthe rivers or their freezing in the winter months led to periodic spikes in freight traffic on the Eastern Railway.

The Eastern Railway itself was also a significant economic factor. Its construction during an economic crisis created jobs on a large scale. At the height of its construction in June 1851, 12,000 workers were employed on building its track. The Royal Railway division of the Eastern Railway in Bromberg (Bydgoszcz) established ten operating offices in Berlin, Schneidemühl, Stolp, Danzig, Königsberg, Allenstein, Thorn, Bromberg, Stettin, and Posen. In 1880, its rolling stock included 265 passenger and express locomotives, 320 freight locomotives and 93 tank locomotives.

A local railway industry was established to supply the Eastern Railway. In 1855, the Union-Gießerei (foundry) Königsberg began to build locomotives; the Schichau-Werke (works) of Ferdinand Schichau of Elbing followed its example in 1860. The Königsberg agricultural equipment manufacturer L. Steinfurt built freight wagons and passenger carriages.

Further independent railway divisions were created in Bromberg, Danzig, Königsberg and Posen under the reorganisation of the Prussian state railways in 1895.

The Eastern Railway was at the time one of the major long-distance rail routes in Europe and one of the main axes for east–west traffic. Several international trains ran on it, including the legendary luxury train, the Nord Express, the latter in the "golden age" before the First World War.

The development of the main railways and branch lines extended the network to 4,833 route kilometers in 1895. At this time Berlin was served by seven daily long-distance freight trains from eastern Germany and, in long-distance passenger traffic, fifteen trains ran daily to East Prussia. Since 1892, “D-trains” (D-Züge: long-distance expresses) also ran on the Eastern Railway.

=== Reichsbahn era ===
After the First World War the Prussian state railways, including the Eastern Railway, along with the other German state railways were incorporated into the newly created Deutsche Reichsbahn. Under the Treaty of Versailles the Polish Corridor was created in 1919, separating the Free City of Danzig and East Prussia from Germany, leaving East Prussia as an exclave. The Eastern Railway line became a major transit link between East Prussia and the rest of Germany. This caused a bottleneck at the bridge over the Vistula to the south of Danzig near Dirschau Conflicts over the use of the railway during the interwar period were declared by Nazi Germany as part of the causes of World War II.

By contrast, the over 1,000 metre-long steel bridge built between 1905 and 1909 over the Vistula near Münsterwalde (Polish: Most w Opaleniu) was dismantled from 1927 to 1929, because the Poles had no use for a bridge to the East Prussian city of Marienwerder.

In the summer 1939 timetable four pairs of express trains, twelve D-trains and a pair of long-distance transit trains between Berlin and Königsberg operated on the line. The latter required a travel time of 6 hours and 36 minutes for the 590 kilometre long line from Königsberg to Berlin Silesian station.

The railway network of the former East Prussian province in 1937 had a length of 4,176 kilometers. On 22 January 1945, the last train ran from Königsberg to Berlin; after that no continuous rail traffic ran on this line.

== Current situation ==
Since 1991 the term Ostbahn (Eastern Railway) has again been used to appeal to the nostalgia of tourists wishing to travel along parts of the former line.

Substantial boundary changes were made as a result of the German defeat in World War II, so that the only part of the former Eastern Railway to remain in Germany is the section from Berlin to the Oder River near Küstrin. This, along with the sections now located on Polish or Russian territory, is mostly operated as a single-track branch line. Some formerly important international stations, such as Eydtkuhnen, no longer exist or have only a very minor role. The only international long-distance train on the Eastern Railway in recent years was the D-448/449 night train (Stanislaw Moniuszko), linking Berlin-Lichtenberg and Warsaw, which ran on the line as far as Piła Główna until 2009. Additionally, through carriages ran on the line to Gdynia, Kaliningrad and Kraków.

=== Germany ===
The section within the current borders of Germany that connects Berlin with the Polish border near Küstrin-Kietz is now a largely single-track non-electrified main line, part of the tariff zone of the Verkehrsverbund Berlin-Brandenburg (Berlin-Brandenburg Transport Association) and has been operated by Niederbarnimer Eisenbahn since 10 December 2006 with Bombardier Talent diesel multiple units. On 22 December 2006, the line speed was restored to 120 km/h between the 75.0 and 80.7 kilometre points for the first time in 60 years. This did not affect travel times or the timetable, but the change is considered a sign of an incipient upgrade of the Eastern Railway.

=== Poland ===
The line in Poland from Kostrzyn to Piła is double track except for a short section at the eastern exit of Gorzów station. The line is single track from Piła to Gutowiec. The line is now duplicated again from Gutowiec to Bogaczewo. It is single track from Bogaczewo to the national border with Russia in Braniewo. From Elbląg to Kaliningrad, a Russian broad gauge track was laid next to the standard gauge track; this has been dismantled between Elbląg and Bogaczewo. This track is still present in Młynary, but unused. Between Chrusciel and Braniewo the ballast is missing and it is not usable. From Tczew to Bogaczewo the line is operated with electric trains. As the line passes through a sparsely populated area, far from urban areas, the Eastern Railway here only carries minor traffic.

=== Russia ===
The short section of line from Kaliningrad to Kybartai in Lithuania is the only part of the former Eastern Railway that still has an important function, as it is the transit route from Kaliningrad to the Russian heartland. It belongs to the Kaliningrad Railway and has been rebuilt to Russian gauge. The former border station at Chernyshevskoye was completely dismantled after Lithuania was annexed by the Soviet Union and border controls were abolished. Russian Railways now rebuilt the border station at Chernyshevskoye because Nesterov station did not provide sufficient capacity. The section from Mamonovo (Heiligenbeil) until shortly before Kaliningrad has a main track in Russian broad gauge and formerly had a standard gauge track. While the broad gauge track follows the traditional route from the west to Kaliningrad South Station (formerly Königsberg Hauptbahnhof), the other track diverted south around the city and reached the station from the east.

== Branch and spur railway lines ==
An important branch of the line was the 290 km long line between Thorn and Insterburg created in 1871–1873 after Thorn was connected with Bromberg in 1861.

Founded in 1846, the Stargard-Posen Railway Company (Stargard-Posener Eisenbahn-Gesellschaft, SPE) built a 170 km-long single-track main line, which connected the two provincial capitals of Stettin and Posen. The route crossed the main line of the Eastern Railway at Kreuz station. Because the company's revenue in the early days did not meet expectations, the government took over the SPE in 1851 and placed it in the Royal Railway Division of the Eastern Railroad in Bromberg, then in 1857 it was also temporarily managed by the state-owned Upper Silesian Railway (Oberschlesischen Eisenbahn). It was formally nationalised on 1 January 1883, although the company name was still used in July 1886. Other important lines of the Eastern Railroad were:

- Danzig – Neufahrwasser (1867)
- Fredersdorf – Rüdersdorf (1872)
- Neustettin – Wangerin (1877, Pommersche Centralbahn)
- Neustettin – Konitz (1878, Pommersche Centralbahn; now the Chojnice - Runowo Pomorskie line)
- Neustettin – Belgard (1878)
- Neustettin – Zollbrück (Pommern) – Rügenwalde/Stolpmünde (1878)
- Schneidemühl – Posen (1879)
- Schneidemühl – Neustettin (1879)
- Laskowitz – Graudenz – Jablonowo (connecting the railways Bromberg – Königsberg and Thorn – Insterburg, 1879/78)
- Insterburg – Goldap – Lyck (1878/79)

== Berlin suburban line ==
While the traffic to the east was limited mostly to long-distance services, upgrading of the line began in Berlin. First, the tracks of the Berlin Ringbahn (the circular railway, the eastern section of which opened in 1871), the Lower Silesian-Märkische Railway (Niederschlesisch-Märkische Eisenbahn-Gesellschaft) from Frankfurt (Oder) and the Eastern Railway connected at a level junction near Stralau Rummelsburg station. From 1 May 1888, trains could run through the Silesian Station over the Berlin Stadtbahn to the centre of Berlin and the lines to its west. Shortly afterwards another pair of tracks was added to the northern half of the Ringbahn to allow suburban trains to run independently of long-distance traffic.

The interweaving of long-distance and suburban tracks at the junction of the Lower Silesian-Märkische railway and the Eastern Railway led to increasing congestion. The location of the intersection with the Ringbahn had insufficient space, so a new grade-separated junction was built on the main line from Frankfurt (Oder) 2 km away at Rummelsburg depot. From there a line ran to the northeast to connect with the main line just to the west of Kaulsdorf. An additional platform was opened at Kaulsdorf station in 1901 for the traffic on this line, known as the VnK line. “Vn” may have stood for Verbindung nach (connection to) or von und nach (from and to) while K probably stood for Kaulsdorf or Küstrin. The old platform was left on the original line for suburban services to the Ringbahn. To the west of this was the link with the Stadtbahn suburban tracks. In 1903, a separate pair of suburban tracks was laid next to the Frankfurt (Oder) line between the intersection of the long-distance lines at Rummelsburg and the start of the Stadtbahn. This required a grade-separation of the Stadtbahn tracks with the link to the Silesian station.

The junction of the Ringbahn with the Stadtbahn and Stralau Rummelsburg station were entirely rebuilt in 1903. The two east–west lines and the Ringbahn were each given a platform for suburban traffic. This development made Stralau-Rummelsburg station one of the biggest stations in Berlin. In 1933 its name was changed to Ostkreuz.

In the mid-1920s, extensive electrification began on the Berlin suburban lines. Electrification of the Eastern Railway was completed on 6 November 1928. Operation of a mixture of steam and electric trains continued until January 1929. On 15 December 1930, the suburban services were designated as S-Bahn services as far as Mahlsdorf station. The long-distance platform was removed at Kaulsdorf station.

The Germania plan of the Nazis envisioned a comprehensive upgrading of the line. The train was to be extended to Strausberg or Rüdersdorf south of the line. Another pair of long-distance tracks would have been built as far as the Berlin city limits at Mahlsdorf. Since the Eastern Railway was a strategically important route on the basis of its orientation, work continued on this project despite the outbreak of the Second World War. In 1944, the predominantly suburban single-track line to Strausberg was put into operation, but services continued to be operated with steam trains. Electrical operations commenced in 1947–1948 in four stages. The S-Bahn route was later extended on a newly built branch line to Strausberg Nord.

In 1989, the U-Bahn line E (now U 5) was extended over the VnK line to Wuhletal station. It is the only station in Berlin where it is possible to transfer between S-Bahn and U-Bahn services on the same platform. In 1992, Birkenstein station was opened between Mahlsdorf and Hoppegarten. At the same time a second S-Bahn track went into operation on this section.

== See also ==
- History of rail transport in Germany
- History of rail transport in Poland
