= Chernyshevskoye railway station =

Railway station in Russia

Chernyshevskoye Чернышевское
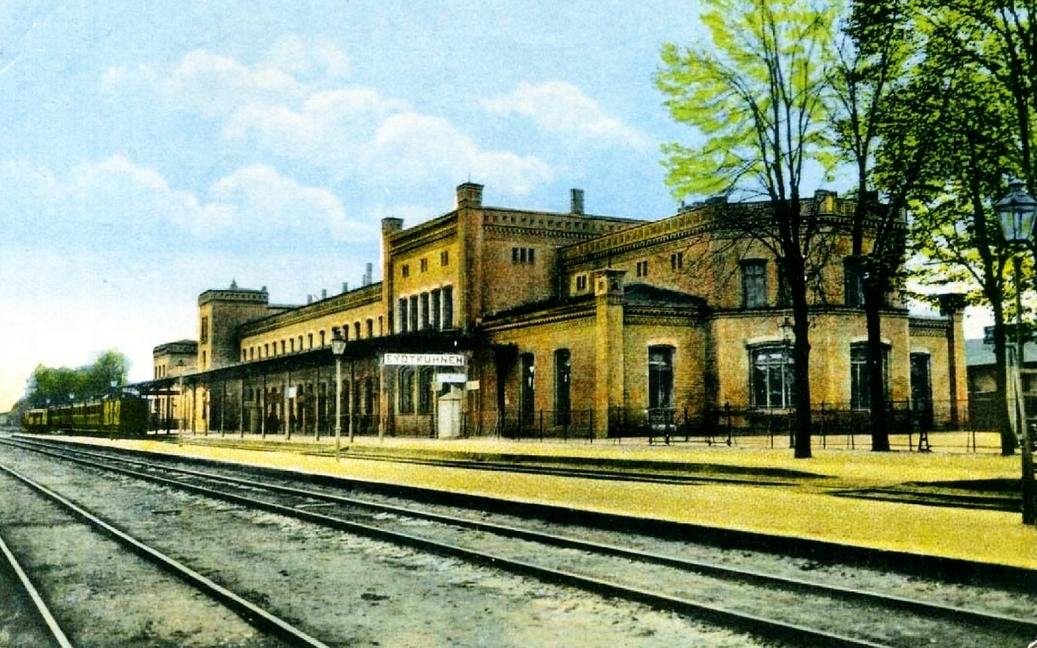
- Eydtkuhnen railway station in 1902

General information
- Coordinates: 54°38′12.9″N 22°44′04.3″E
- Owner: Russian Railways
- Operator: Kaliningrad Railway
- Line: Kaliningrad—Chernyshevskoye
- Platforms: 2
- Tracks: 3

History
- Opened: 1860
- Former names: Eydtkuhnen; Eydtkau
Location
- Location within Kaliningrad Oblast Location within European Russia Location within Russia

Chernyshevskoye railway station (Russian: Станция Чернышевское) is a railway station in the settlement of Chernyshevskoye in Nesterovsky District in the eastern part of Kaliningrad Oblast, an exclave of the Russian Federation on the Baltic Sea between Poland and Lithuania. Located on the Kaliningrad—Chernyshevskoye railway line, the station is a border station on the border between Russia and Lithuania, situated on the Russian side, with the neighbouring Kybartai railway station situated 2 km (1.2 mi) to the east on the Lithuanian side.

Originally located in the Prussian province of East Prussia, the station opened as Eydtkuhnen railway station (German: Bahnhof Eydtkuhnen) in 1860 as a part of the railway connection between Saint Petersburg, Königsberg and Berlin. The station became an important border station between the German and Russian Empires, where passengers travelling between Western Europe and the Russian capital had to change trains and freight had to be transloaded due to the different track gauges.

After World War II when the northern half of East Prussia as well as Lithuania were annexed by the Soviet Union, border controls became irrelevant and the former border station at Chernyshevskoye was completely dismantled. After the dissolution of the Soviet Union, however, customs and border controls were reinstalled, and Russian Railways has since rebuilt the border station at Chernyshevskoye because the neighbouring Nesterov railway station 10 km (6.2 mi) to the west did not provide sufficient capacity.

Map of the railway network in Kaliningrad Oblast

== Gallery ==
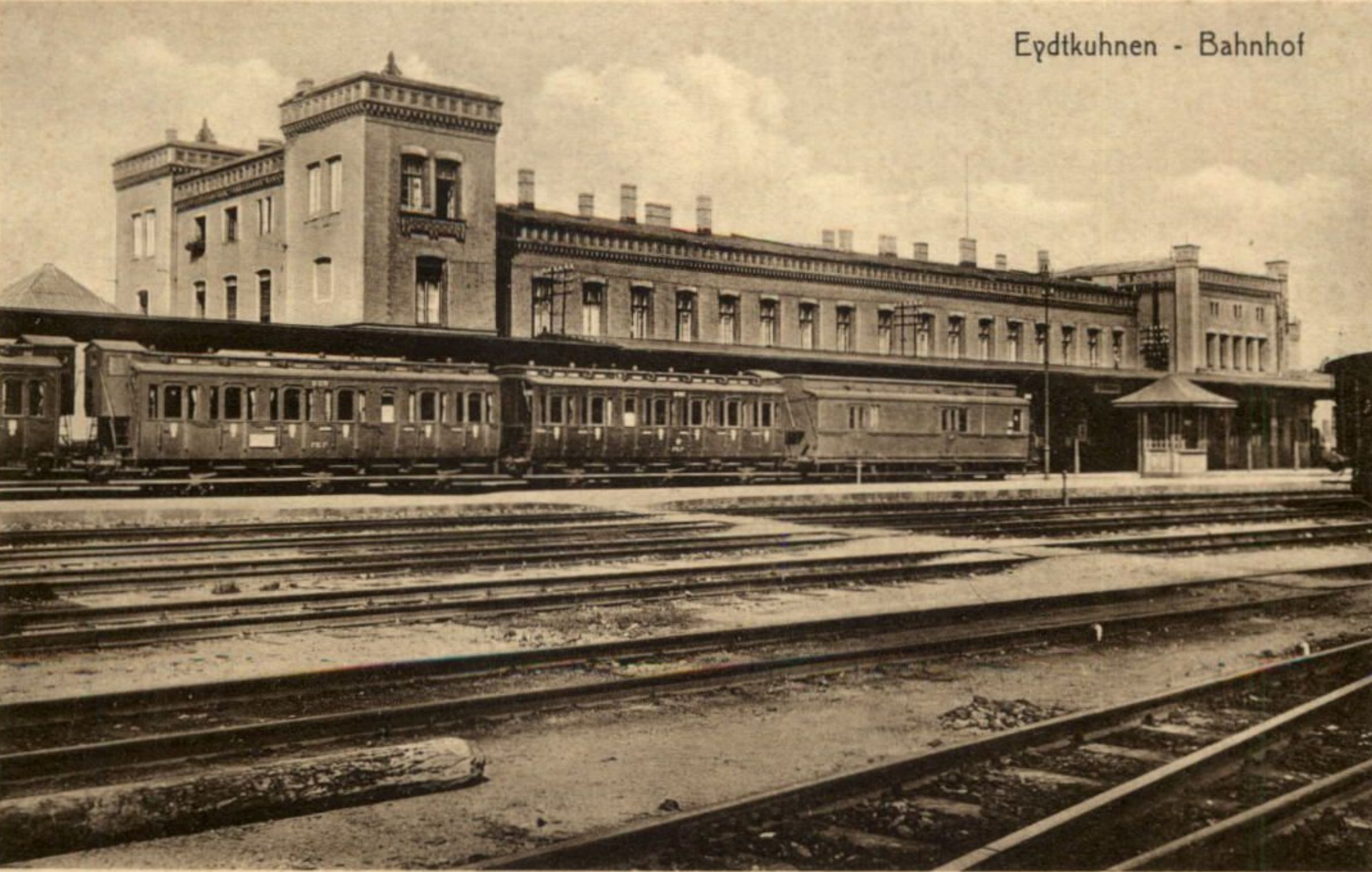
Eydtkuhnen railway station in the early 20th century

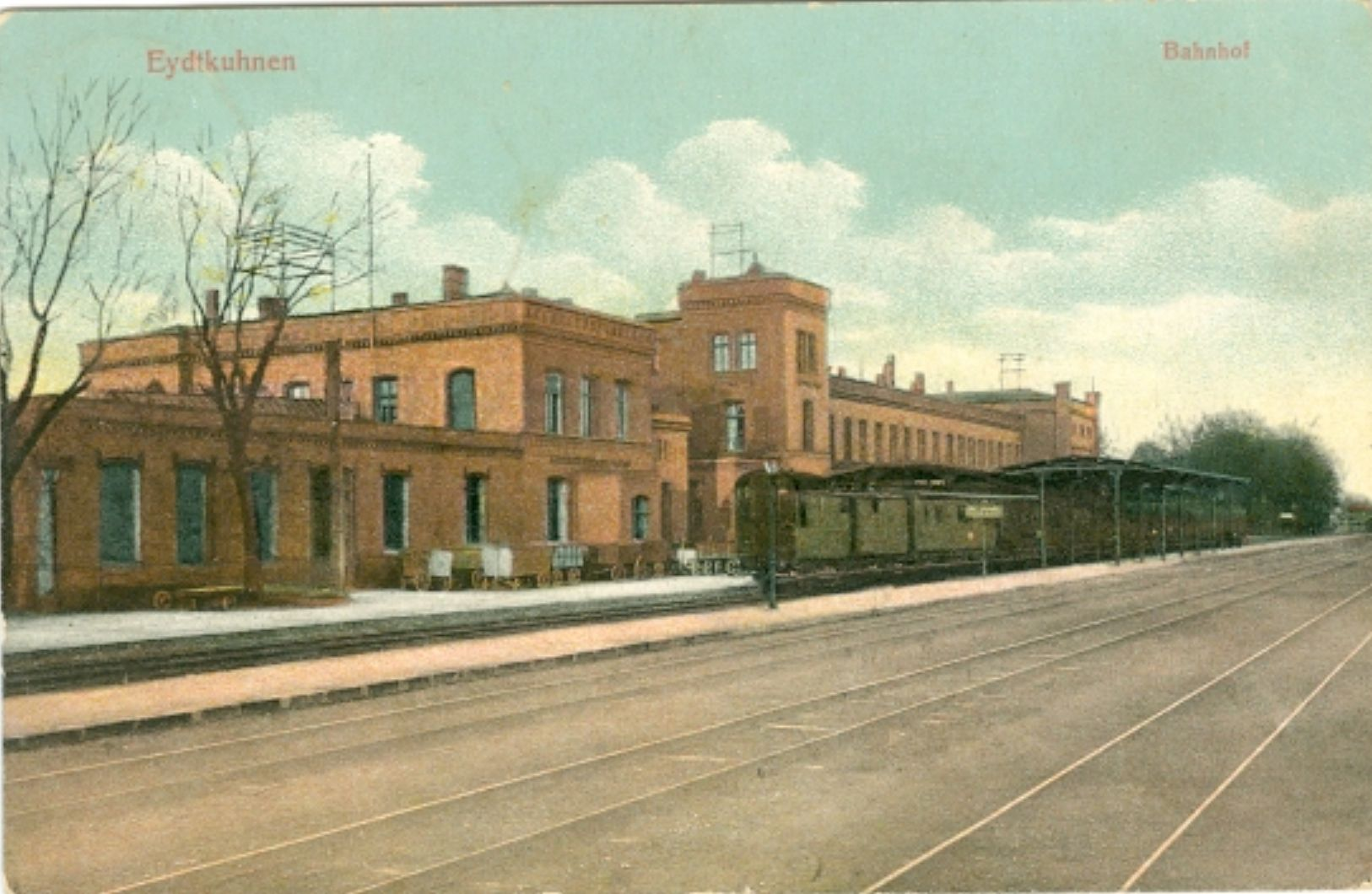
Eydtkuhnen railway station in 1915

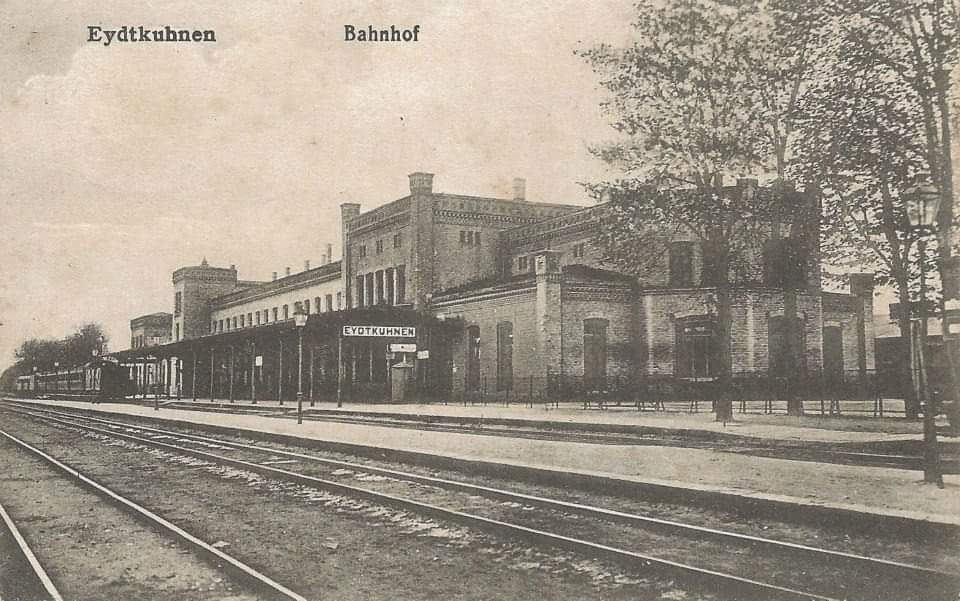
Eydtkuhnen railway station in 1918

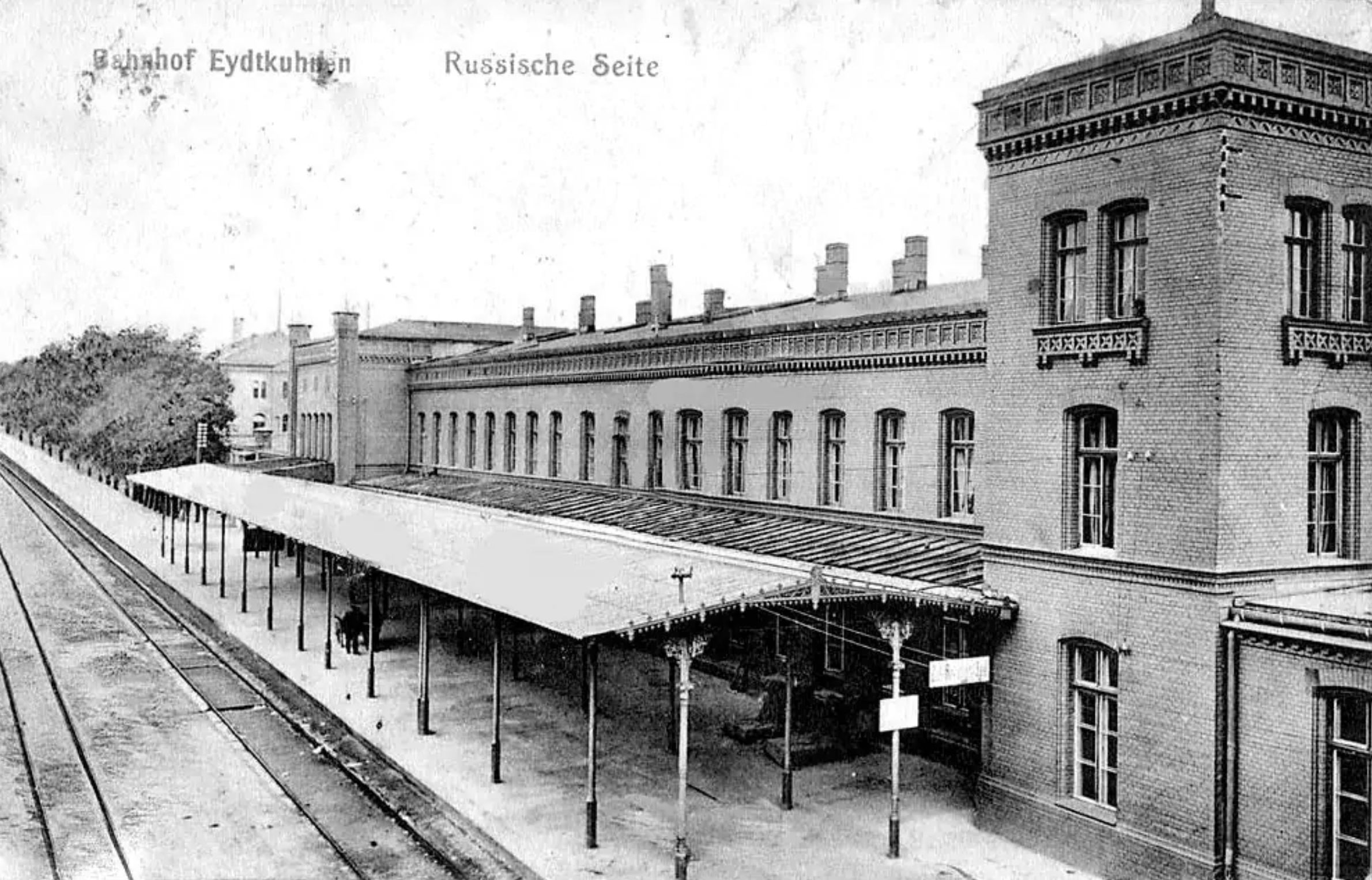
Eydtkuhnen railway station in the 1920s

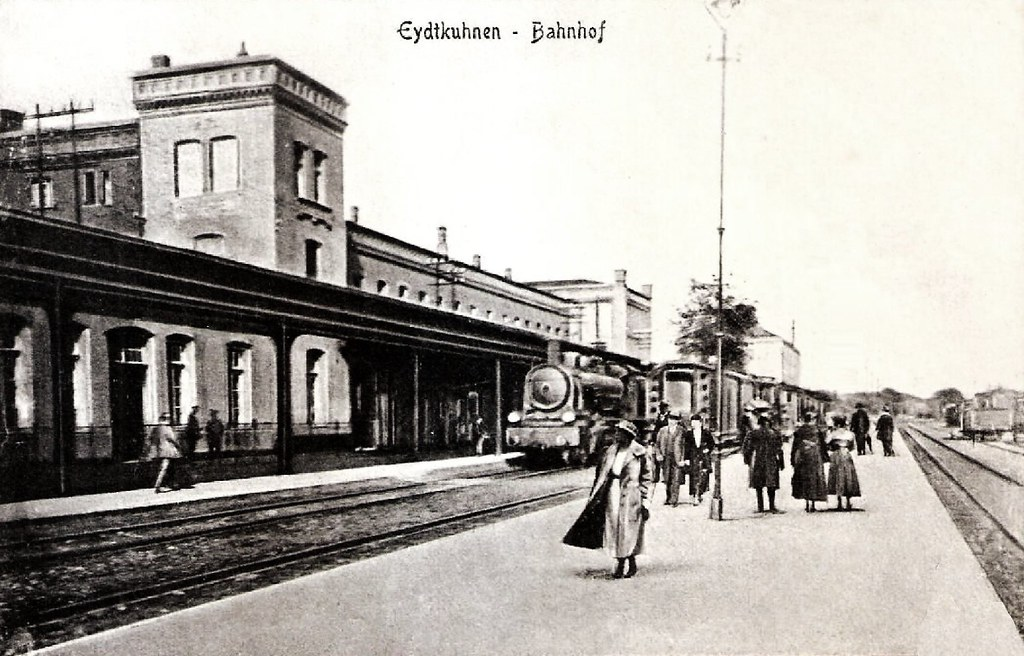
Eydtkuhnen railway station c. 1924

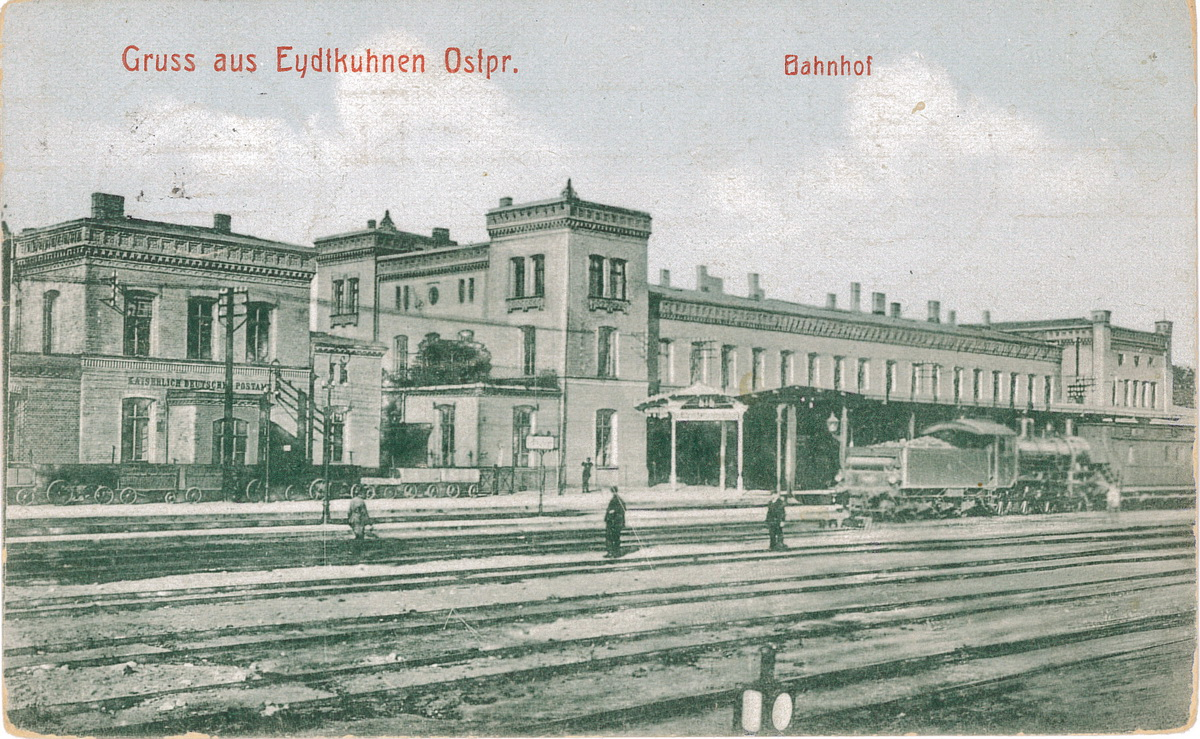
Eydtkuhnen railway station in the interwar years

== See also ==
- Rail transport in Russia
- History of rail transport in Germany
- Transport in Russia
