= Vilkaviškis District Municipality =

Coordinates: 54°34′30″N 22°59′17″E

Vilkaviškis District Municipality Vilkaviškio rajono savivaldybė
- Municipality
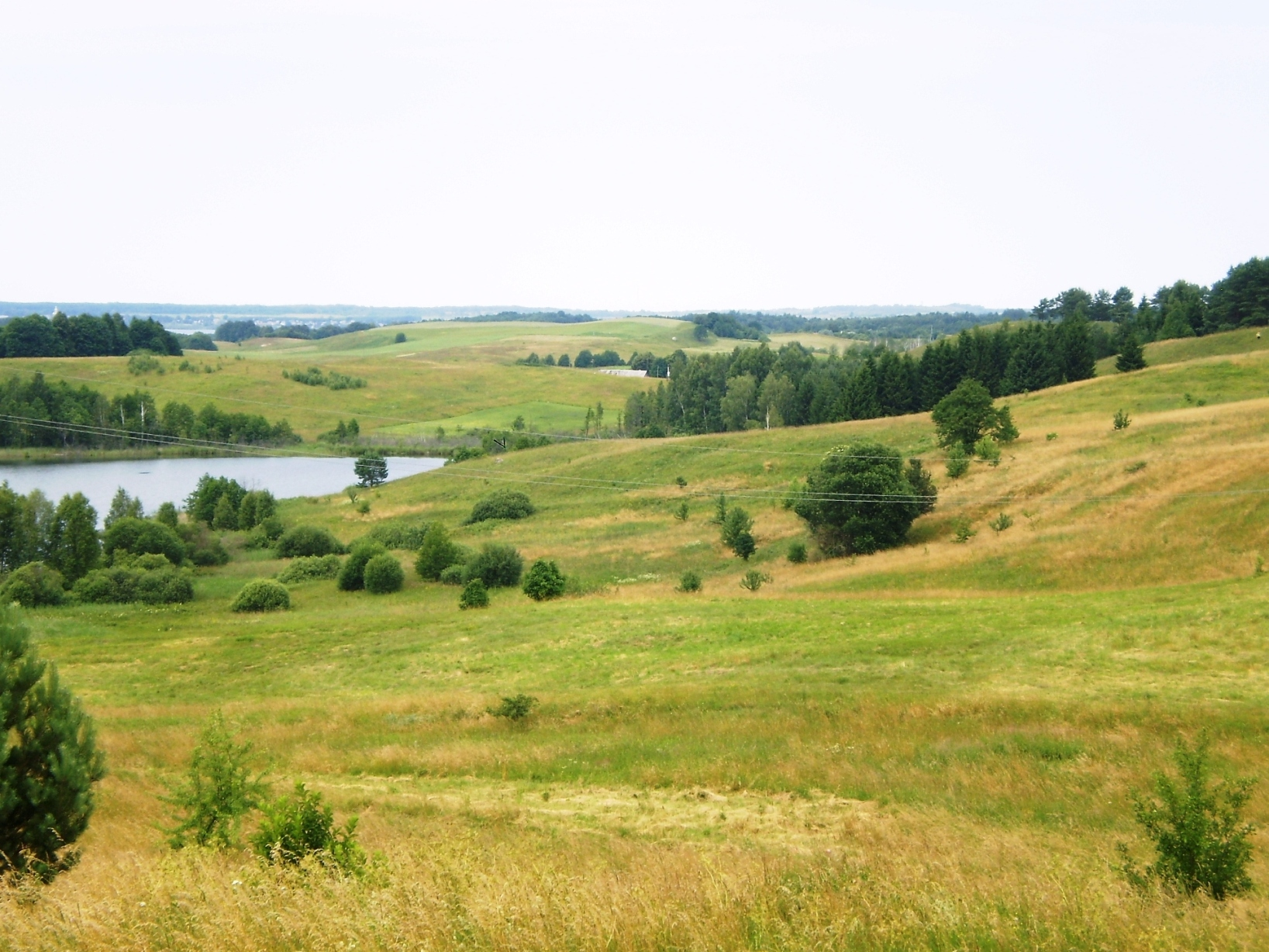
- Sūduva Heights

- Flag Coat of arms

- Location of Vilkaviškis district municipality within Marijampolė County

- Map of Vilkaviškis district municipality
- Country: Lithuania
- Ethnographic region: Suvalkija
- County: Marijampolė County
- Capital: Vilkaviškis
- Elderships: 12

Area
  - Total: 1,259 km^{2} (486 sq mi)
  - Rank: 28th

Population (2021)
  - Total: 35,368
  - Rank: 18-19th
  - Density: 28.09/km^{2} (72.76/sq mi)
  - Rank: 22nd
- Time zone: UTC+2 (EET)
  - Summer (DST): UTC+3 (EEST)
- Telephone code: 342
- Major settlements: Vilkaviškis (pop. 12,645); Kybartai (pop. 4,079)
- Website: www.vilkaviskis.lt

Vilkaviškis District Municipality is one of 60 municipalities in Lithuania. Its administrative center is Vilkaviškis.

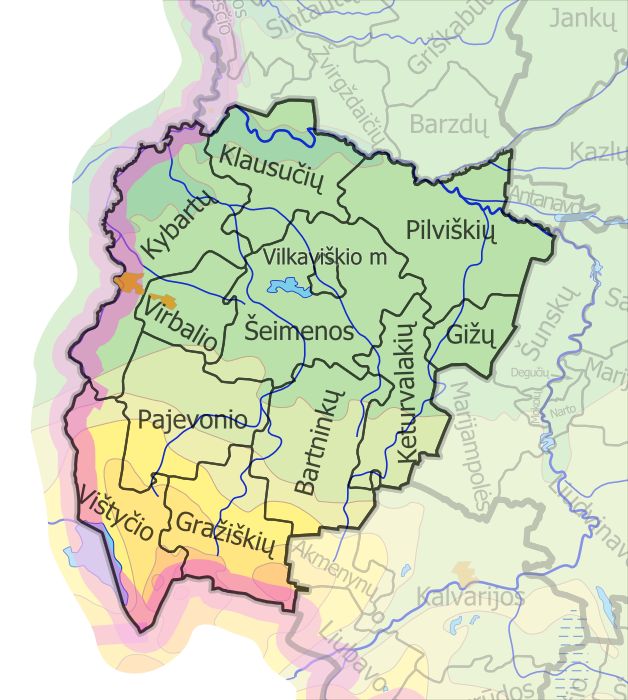
Elderships in Vilkaviškis District Municipality
