= List of cities in Brandenburg by population =

The following list sorts all cities and communes in the German state of Brandenburg with a population of more than 15,000. As of December 31, 2025, 43 cities fulfill this criterion and are listed here. This list refers only to the population of individual municipalities within their defined limits, which does not include other municipalities or suburban areas within urban agglomerations.

== List ==
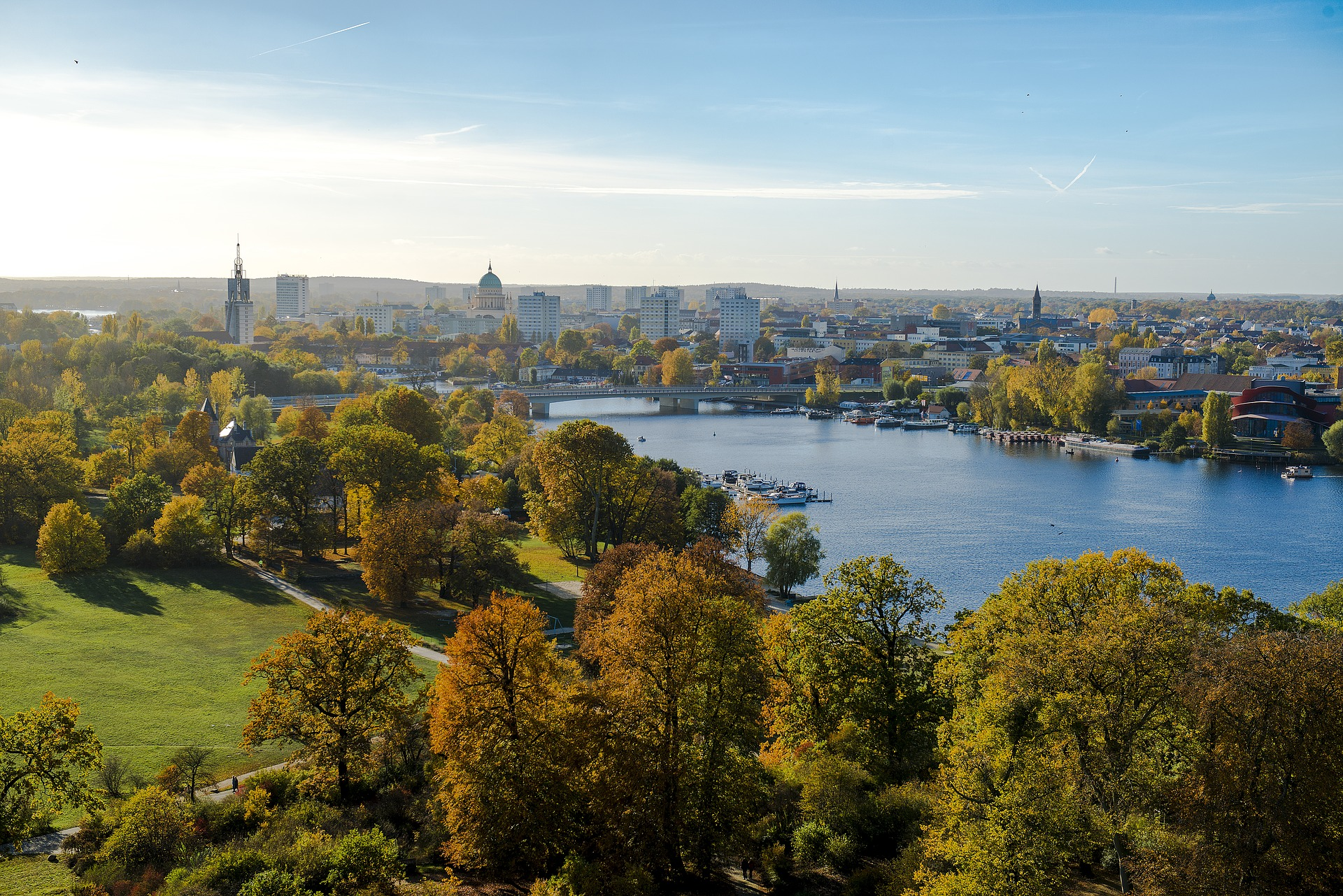
Potsdam

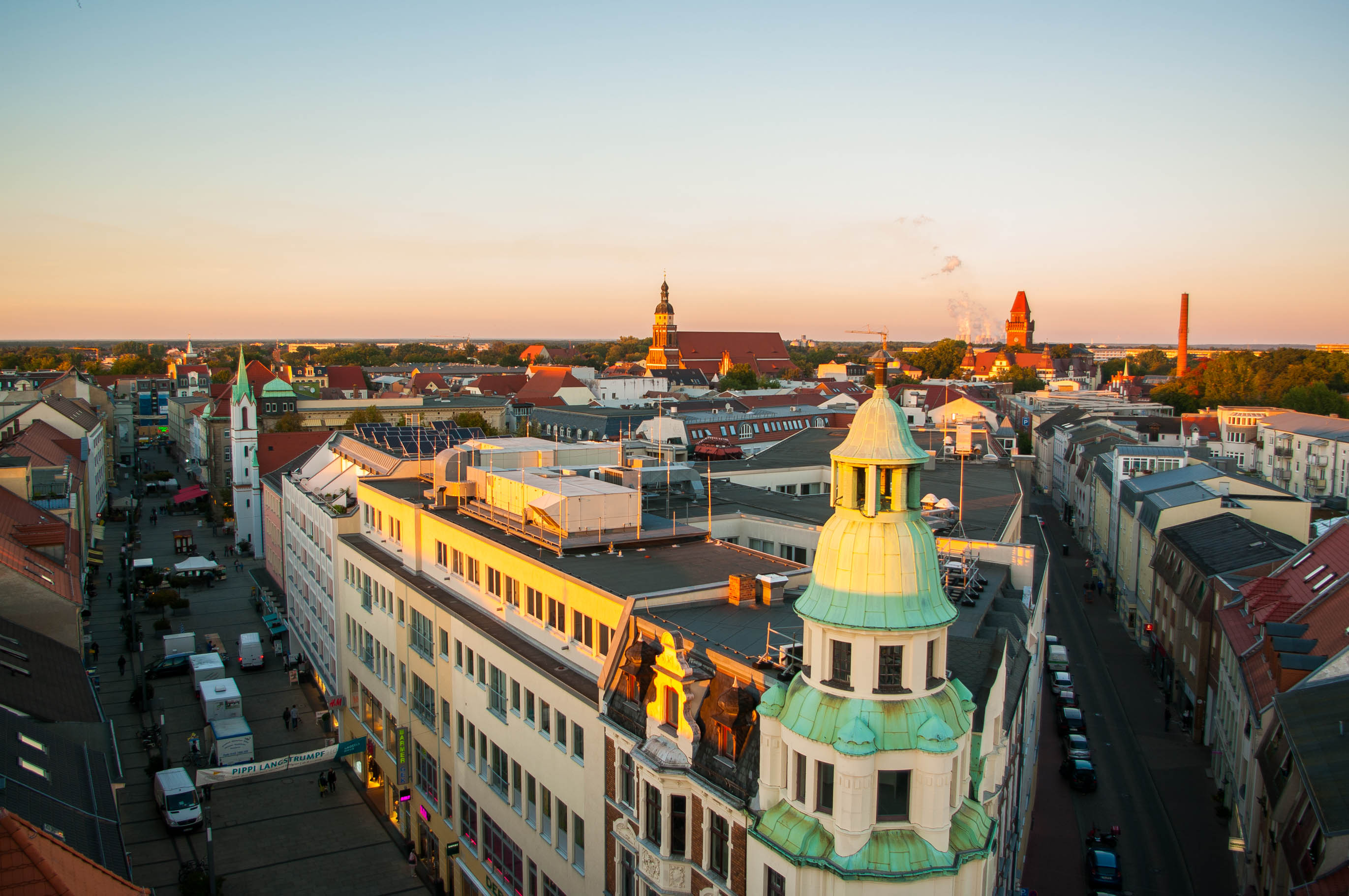
Cottbus

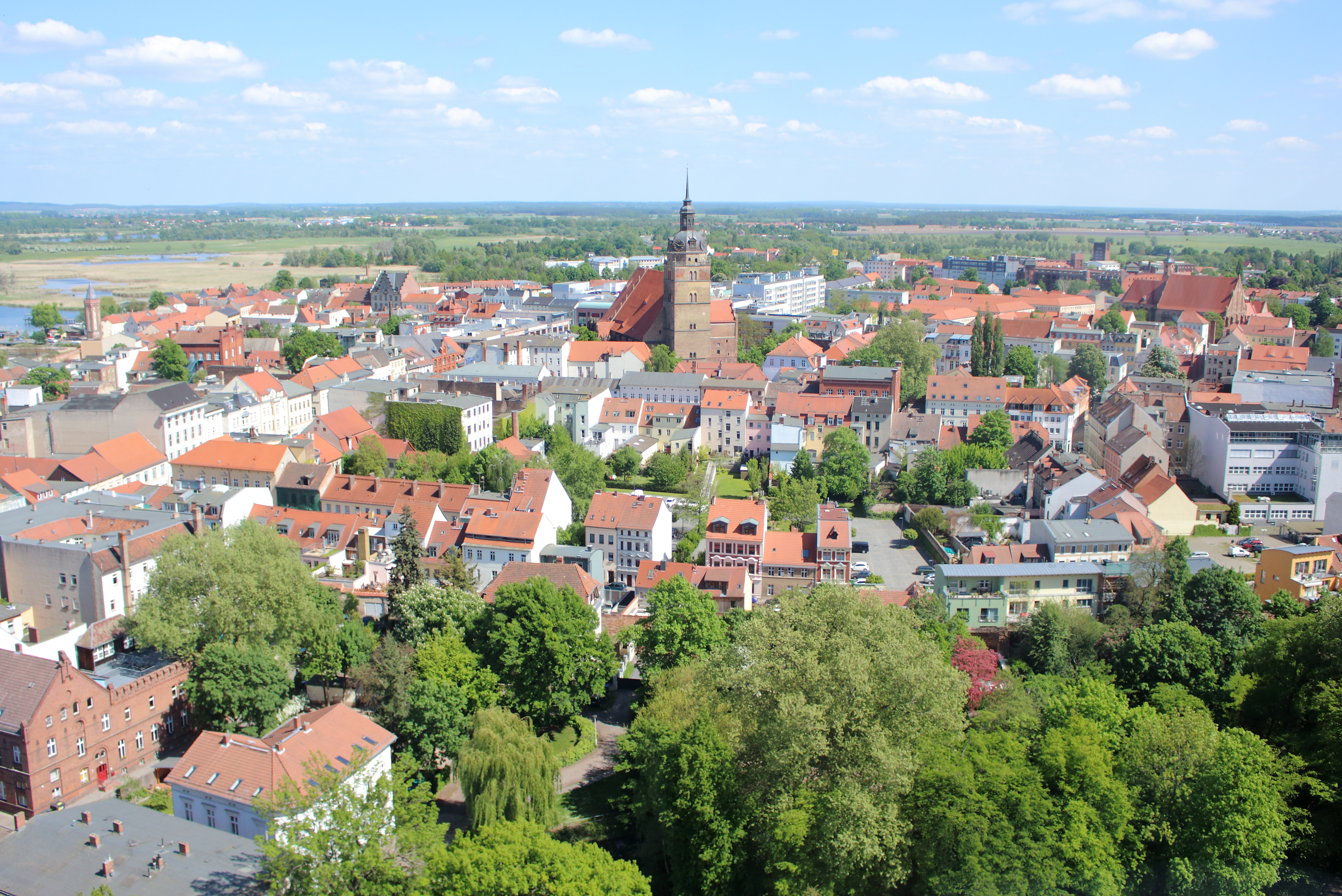
Brandenburg an der Havel

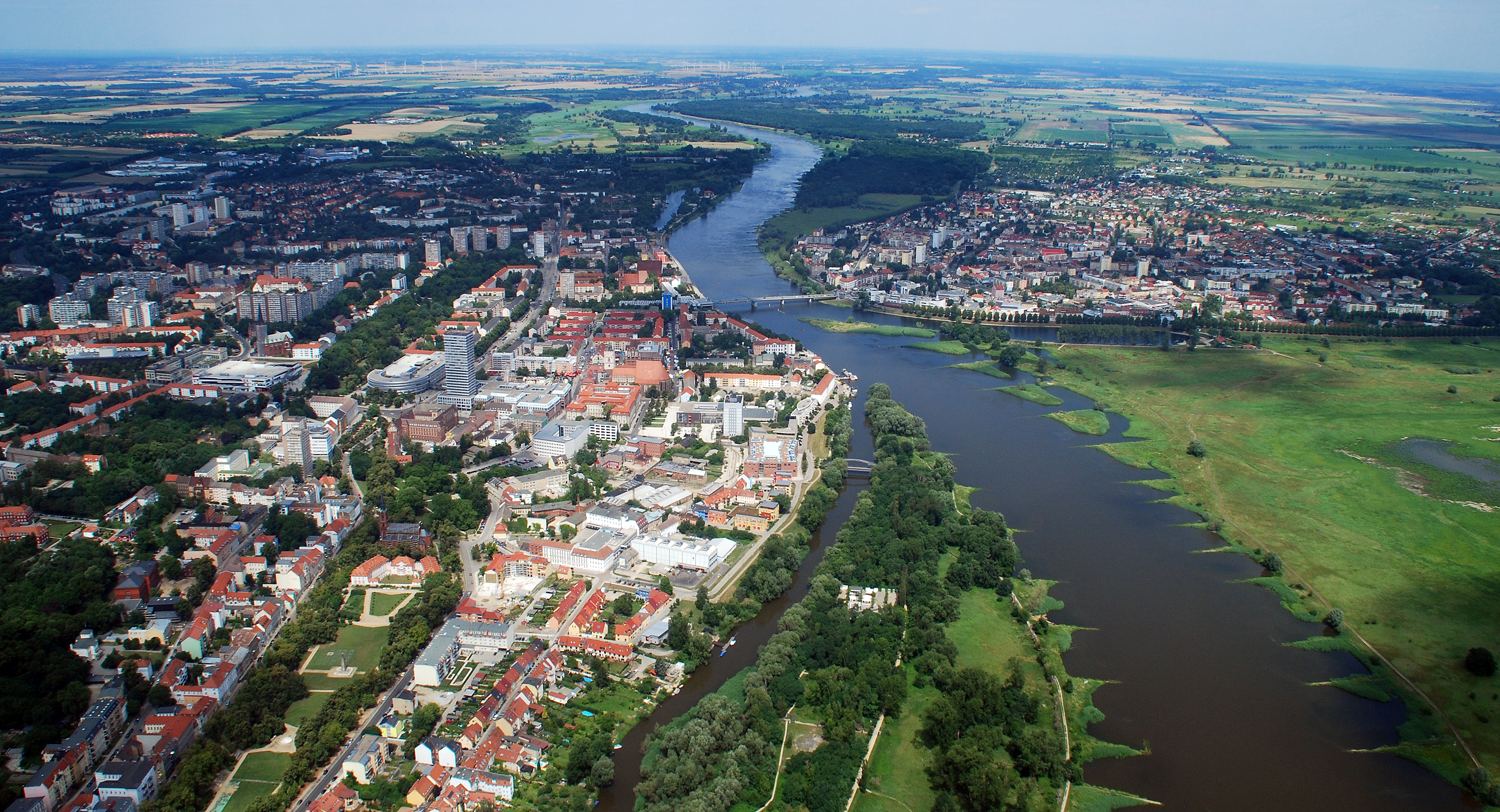
Frankfurt (Oder)

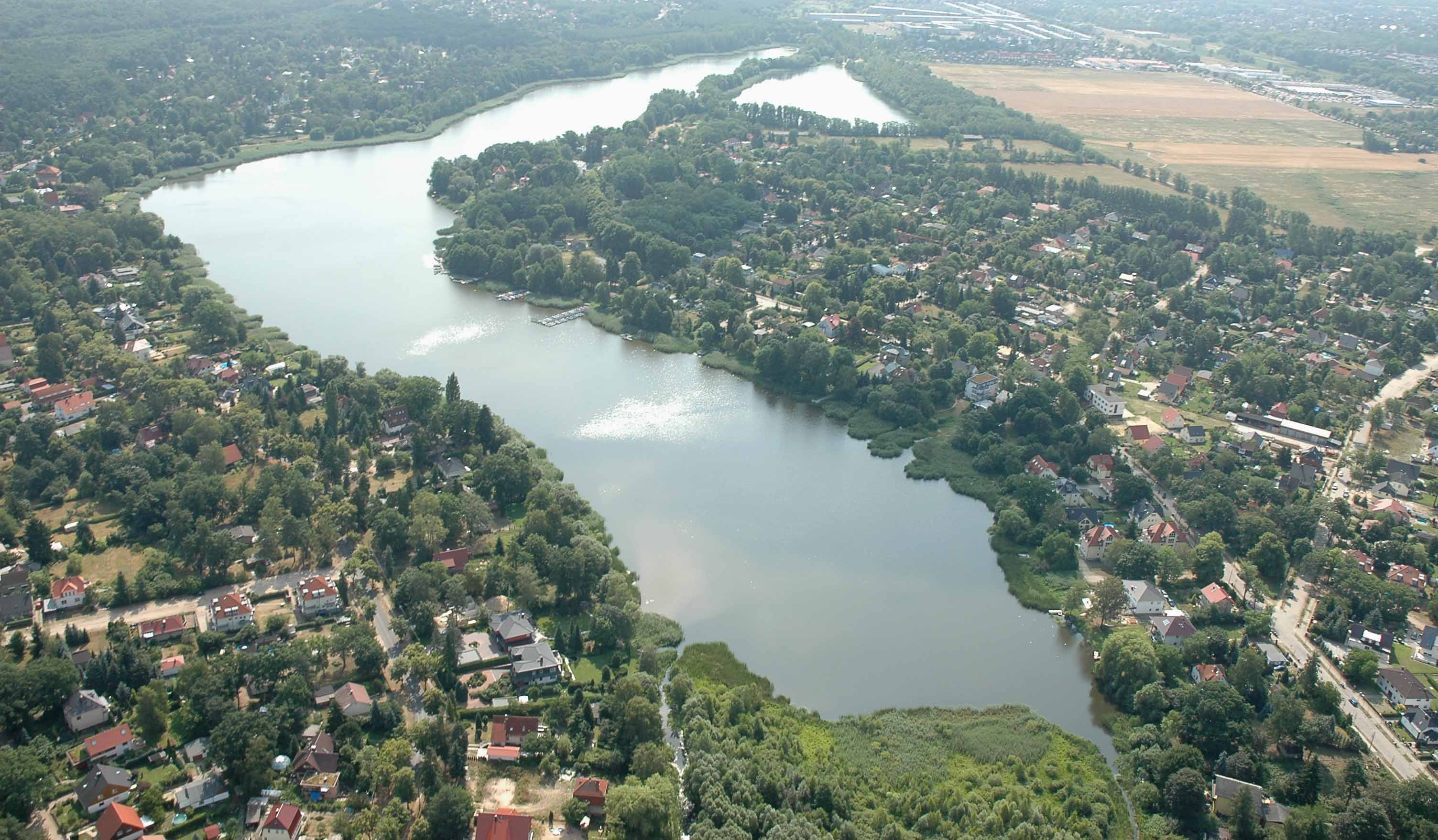
Falkensee

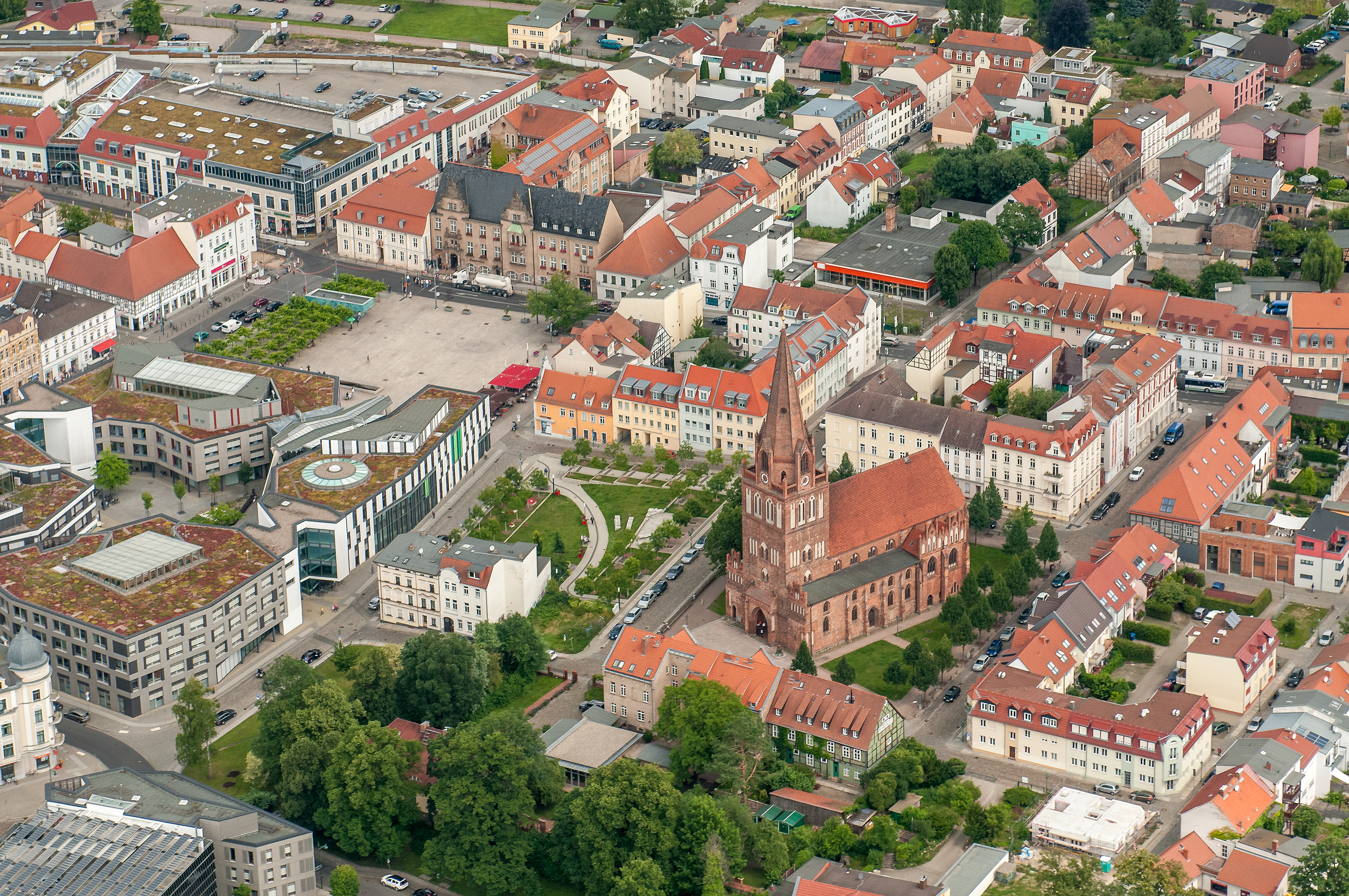
Eberswalde

The following table lists the 41 cities and communes in Brandenburg with a population of at least 15,000 on December 31, 2024, as estimated by the Federal Statistical Office of Germany. A city is displayed in bold if it is a state or federal capital.

1. The city rank by population as of December 31, 2024, as estimated by the Federal Statistical Office of German
2. The city name
3. The name of the district (Landkreis) in which the city lies (some cities are districts on their own called urban districts)
4. The city population as of May 15, 2022, as enumerated by the 2022 German census
5. The city population as of May 9, 2011, as enumerated by the 2011 European Union census
6. The city land area as of December 31, 2025
7. The city population density as of December 31, 2025 (residents per unit of land area)

2025 rank	City	District	2025 estimate	2022 census	2011 census	2025 land area	2025 pop. density
1	**Potsdam**	urban district	184,754	182,806	156,021	188 km^{2}	981.5/km^{2}
2	Cottbus	urban district	95,123	93,926	99,984	166 km^{2}	574.4/km^{2}
3	Brandenburg an der Havel	urban district	74,113	73,552	71,569	230 km^{2}	322.6/km^{2}
4	Frankfurt (Oder)	urban district	57,107	55,841	59,140	148 km^{2}	386.2/km^{2}
5	Oranienburg	Oberhavel	49,122	47,608	41,269	164 km^{2}	300.1/km^{2}
6	Falkensee	Havelland (district)	45,720	44,683	40,228	43.3 km^{2}	1,055/km^{2}
7	Bernau bei Berlin	Barnim	44,597	43,164	35,631	104 km^{2}	428.0/km^{2}
8	Eberswalde	Barnim	41,481	40,607	39,166	93.6 km^{2}	443.0/km^{2}
9	Königs Wusterhausen	Dahme-Spreewald	39,360	38,400	33,706	96.0 km^{2}	382.2/km^{2}
10	Schwedt	Uckermark (district)	33,730	33,578	36,543	361 km^{2}	93.50/km^{2}
11	Fürstenwalde	Oder-Spree	32,002	31,851	30,913	70.7 km^{2}	452.8/km^{2}
12	Neuruppin	Ostprignitz-Ruppin	31,962	31,421	30,328	305 km^{2}	104.7/km^{2}
13	Ludwigsfelde	Teltow-Fläming	29,514	27,667	23,661	110 km^{2}	268.4/km^{2}
14	Blankenfelde-Mahlow	Teltow-Fläming	29,129	28,970	25,503	55.2 km^{2}	528.0/km^{2}
15	Strausberg	Märkisch-Oderland	27,719	26,902	25,591	68.0 km^{2}	408.0/km^{2}
16	Teltow	Potsdam-Mittelmark	27,682	27,212	22,356	21.6 km^{2}	1,282/km^{2}
17	Werder (Havel)	Potsdam-Mittelmark	27,065	26,938	23,196	117 km^{2}	231.1/km^{2}
18	Hohen Neuendorf	Oberhavel	26,857	26,551	24,459	48.6 km^{2}	553.1/km^{2}
19	Hennigsdorf	Oberhavel	26,677	26,679	25,520	31.5 km^{2}	847.4/km^{2}
20	Rathenow	Havelland (district)	25,087	24,416	24,462	113 km^{2}	221.8/km^{2}
21	Eisenhüttenstadt	Oder-Spree	24,703	23,608	28,219	63.5 km^{2}	389.2/km^{2}
22	Wandlitz	Barnim	24,503	23,951	20,615	163 km^{2}	150.5/km^{2}
23	Senftenberg	Oberspreewald-Lausitz	23,466	23,777	25,582	128 km^{2}	184.0/km^{2}
24	Zossen	Teltow-Fläming	21,412	20,192	17,267	180 km^{2}	118.7/km^{2}
25	Panketal	Barnim	21,153	21,028	18,886	25.9 km^{2}	818.0/km^{2}
26	Spremberg	Spree-Neiße	21,140	21,378	23,615	202 km^{2}	104.5/km^{2}
27	Luckenwalde	Teltow-Fläming	21,010	20,600	20,242	46.6 km^{2}	450.8/km^{2}
28	Nauen	Havelland (district)	19,679	18,918	16,385	268 km^{2}	73.4/km^{2}
29	Kleinmachnow	Potsdam-Mittelmark	19,274	19,602	19,874	11.9 km^{2}	1,618/km^{2}
30	Neuenhagen bei Berlin	Märkisch-Oderland	19,225	19,151	16,751	19.6 km^{2}	980.4/km^{2}
31	Schönefeld	Dahme-Spreewald	19,154	18,461	13,076	81.6 km^{2}	234.7/km^{2}
32	Prenzlau	Uckermark (district)	18,928	18,847	19,296	143 km^{2}	132.4/km^{2}
33	Hoppegarten	Märkisch-Oderland	18,218	18,109	16,628	32.0 km^{2}	569.7/km^{2}
34	Forst (Lausitz)	Spree-Neiße	17,155	17,388	19,757	111 km^{2}	155.0/km^{2}
35	Wittenberge	Prignitz	17,058	16,829	17,792	50.6 km^{2}	336.9/km^{2}
36	Stahnsdorf	Potsdam-Mittelmark	16,087	15,850	14,031	49.5 km^{2}	325.2/km^{2}
37	Rüdersdorf bei Berlin	Märkisch-Oderland	15,889	15,435	14,922	70.4 km^{2}	225.7/km^{2}
38	Guben	Spree-Neiße	15,794	16,237	18,620	44.0 km^{2}	359.0/km^{2}
39	Lübbenau	Oberspreewald-Lausitz	15,778	15,764	16,489	139 km^{2}	113.1/km^{2}
40	Templin	Uckermark (district)	15,590	15,593	16,237	379 km^{2}	41.1/km^{2}
41	Finsterwalde	Elbe-Elster	15,496	15,606	16,970	77.2 km^{2}	199.9/km^{2}
42	Petershagen-Eggersdorf	Märkisch-Oderland	15,432	15,419	13,890	17.6 km^{2}	875.3/km^{2}
43	Mühlenbecker Land	Oberhavel	15,177	15,369	13,933	52.7 km^{2}	288.3/km^{2}
