= Mahlsdorf =

- Quarter of Berlin
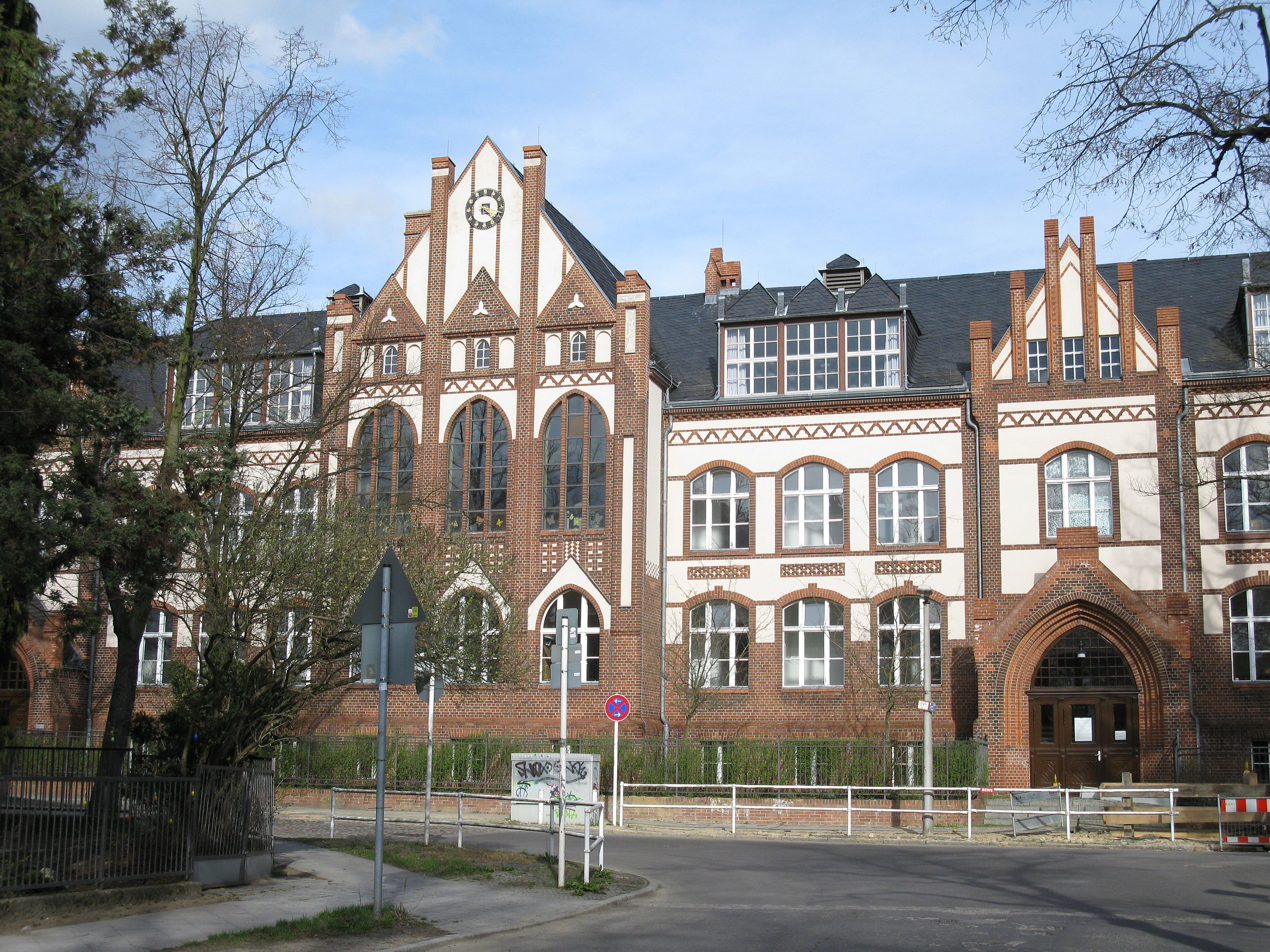
- Friedrich Schiller elementary school

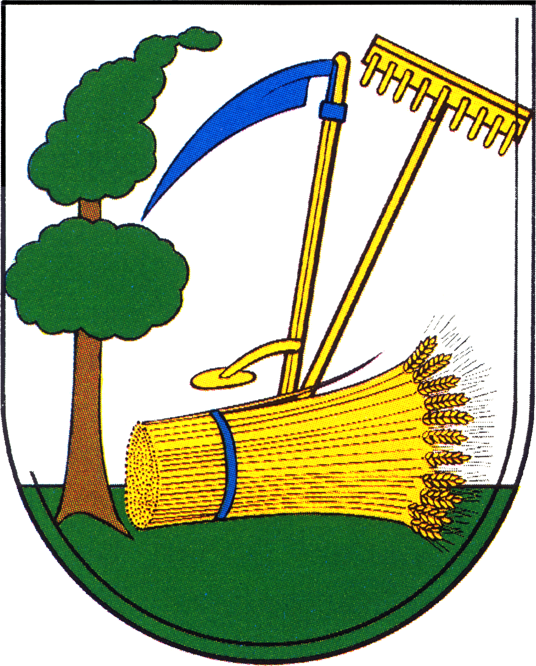
- Coat of arms

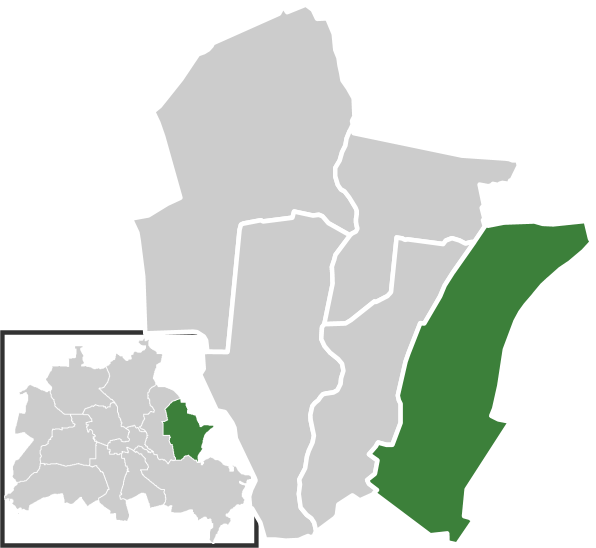
- Location of Mahlsdorf in Marzahn-Hellersdorf district and Berlin
- Interactive map of Mahlsdorf
- Location within Germany Location within Berlin
- Coordinates: 52°30′22″N 13°36′54″E
- Country: Germany
- State: Berlin
- City: Berlin
- Borough: Marzahn-Hellersdorf
- Founded: 1753
- Subdivisions: 2 zones

Area
  - Total: 12.9 km^{2} (5.0 sq mi)
- Elevation: 50 m (160 ft)

Population (2024-12-31)
  - Total: 30,353
  - Density: 2,350/km^{2} (6,090/sq mi)
- Time zone: UTC+01:00 (CET)
  - Summer (DST): UTC+02:00 (CEST)
- Postal codes: 12623
- Vehicle registration: B

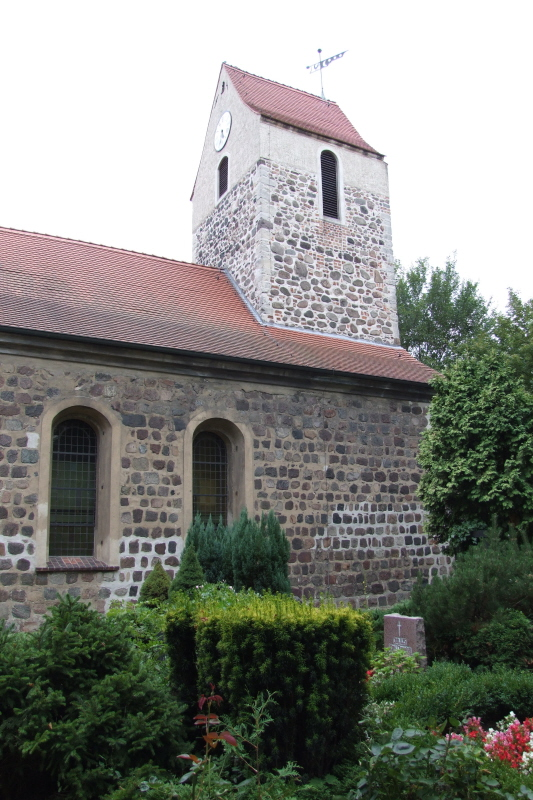
Village church

Mahlsdorf (German pronunciation: [ˈmaːlsˌdɔʁf]) is a locality (Ortsteil) within the Berlin borough (Bezirk) of Marzahn-Hellersdorf. Until 2001 it was part of the former borough of Hellersdorf and has a population of roughly 32000

== History ==
The locality was mentioned for the first time in a document of 1345, named as Malterstorp. Until 1920 it was a municipality of the former Niederbarnim district, merged into Berlin with the "Greater Berlin Act".

== Geography ==
=== Overview ===
Mahlsdorf is located in the eastern suburb of Berlin, at the borders with the Brandenburger district of Märkisch-Oderland. It is bounded by the municipality of Neuenhagen and Hoppegarten, with its hamlets Hönow, Waldesruh and Birkenstein. The Berliner bordering localities are Hellersdorf, Kaulsdorf and Köpenick (in Treptow-Köpenick district). In the south of the quarter there are the lakes Elsensee and part of the Habermannsee, divided with Kaulsdorf.

=== Subdivision ===
Mahlsdorf is divided into 2 zones (Ortslagen):

- Mahlsdorf-Nord
- Mahlsdorf-Süd

== Transport ==
The locality, crossed by the federal highways B1 and B5, is served by the S-Bahn line S5, at the rail station of Mahlsdorf. Birkenstein station, situated in the homonymous hamlet of the town of Hoppegarten, is close to the eastern suburb of the quarter.

== Gallery ==
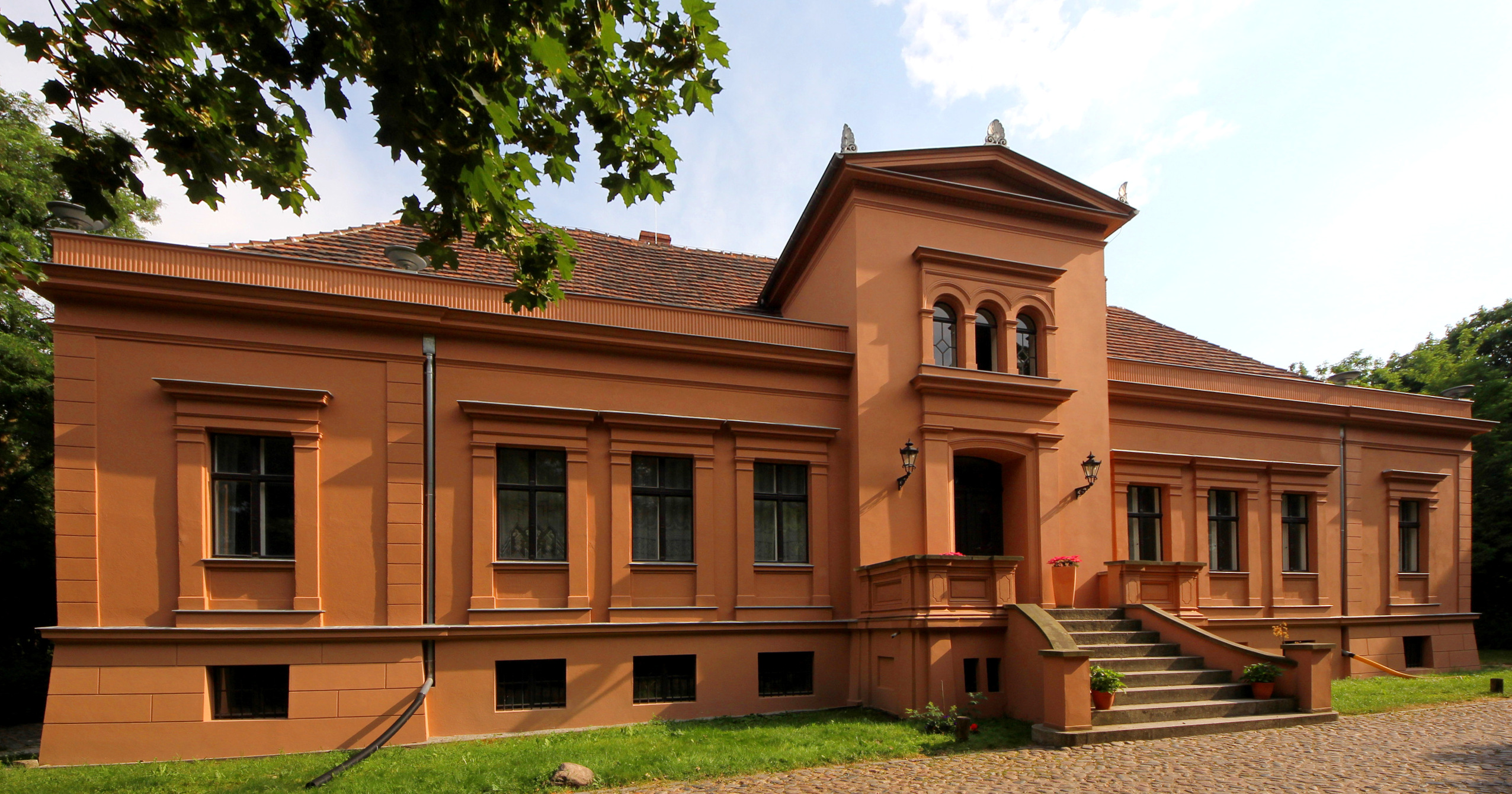
The Gründerzeitmuseum

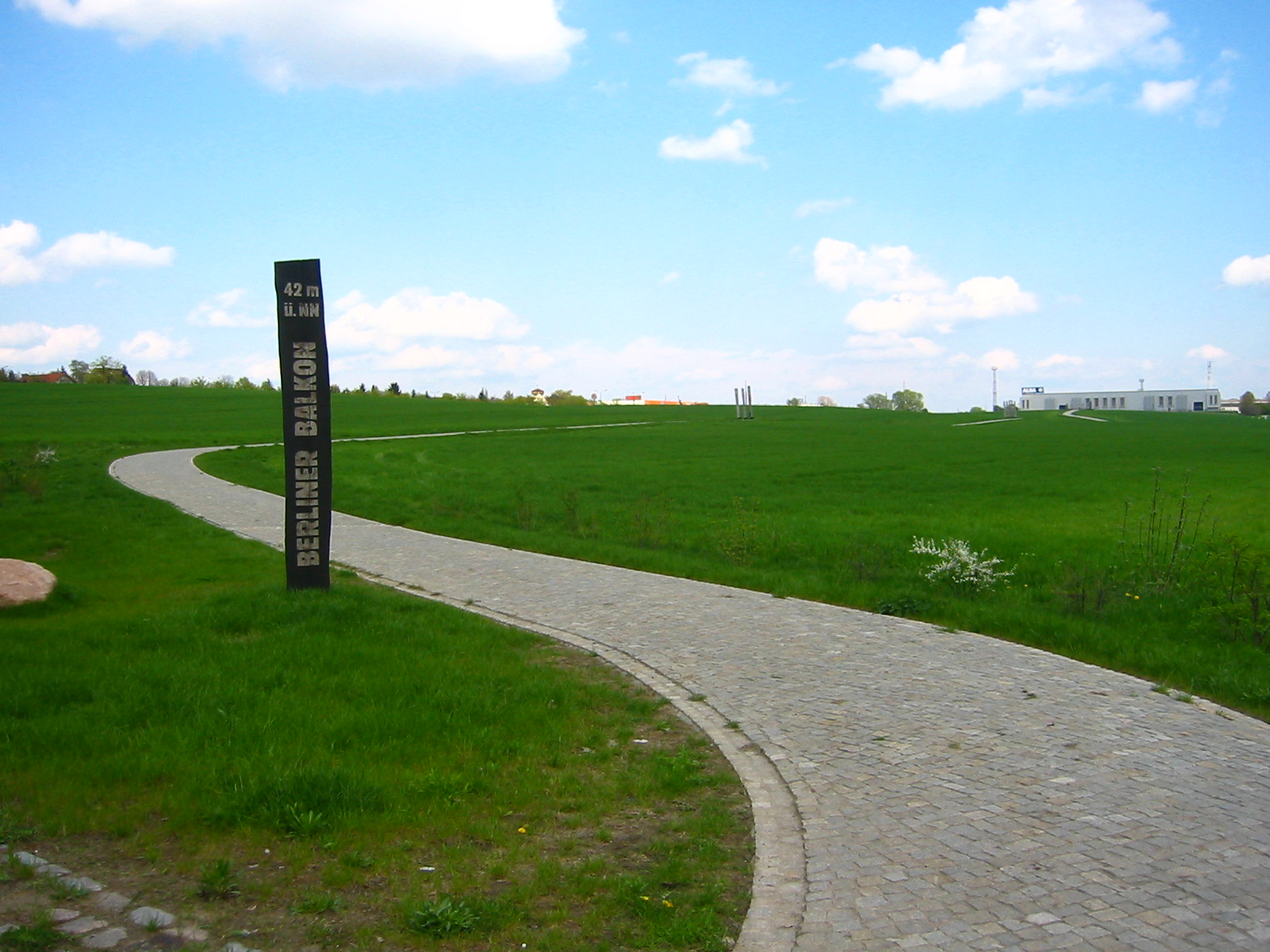
The hill Berliner Balkon

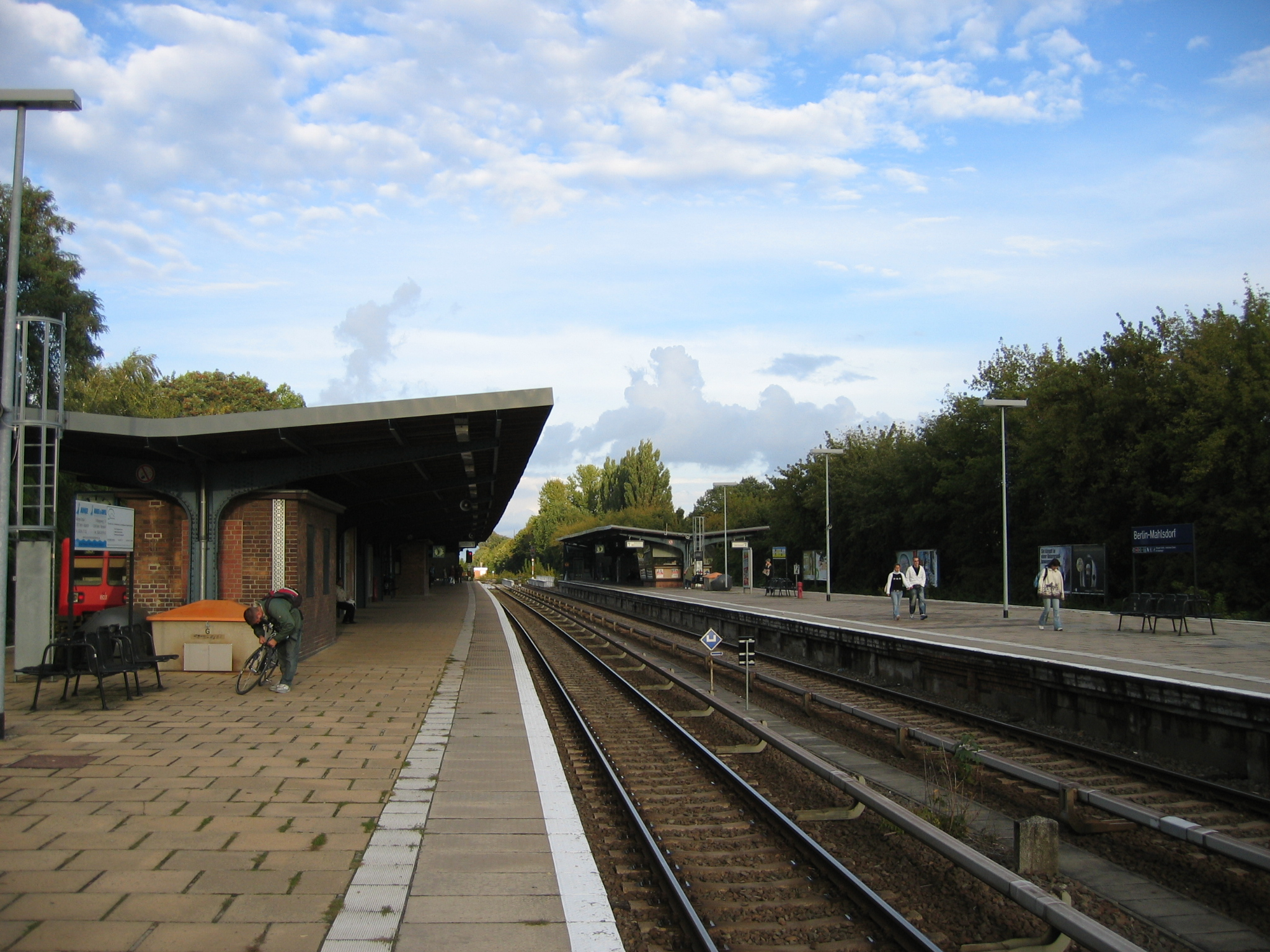
Railway station

== Personalities ==
- Gerhard Behrendt (1929–2006)
- Ralf Bursy (1956–2022)
- Alice Herz (1882–1965)
- Siegfried Lorenz (1945-2024)
- Charlotte von Mahlsdorf (1928–2002)
- Kathrin Schmidt (born 1958)
- Kurt Schwaen (1909–2007)
- Reiner Süß (1930–2015)
- Petra Zieger (born 1959)

== Literature ==
- Kurt Pomplun: "Berlins alte Dorfkirchen" (page 59). Verlag Bruno Hessling, Berlin 1967
