= TKS 49ers =

German basketball team

- Leagues: ProB
- Founded: 1982; 44 years ago
- Arena: Berlin Brandenburg International School
- Location: Stahnsdorf and Kleinmachnow, Germany
- President: Andreas Zahn
- Head coach: Nicolai Coputerco
- Website: Official website
Home	Away

TKS 49ers (Teltow-Kleinmachnow-Stahnsdorf) is a German professional basketball team located at the southwest border of Berlin. The team competes in Germany's ProB league. Because of its proximity to Berlin, the club has cooperations with the Berlin clubs TuS Lichterfelde and DBV Charlottenburg.

== Head coaches ==
- (Croatia) Denis Toroman: 2019
- (Germany) Kai Buchmannn: 2019
- (Ukraine) Vladimir Pastushenko: 2019
- (Moldova) Nicolai Coputerco: 2019-present

== Notable players ==
- Set a club record or won an individual award as a professional player.
- Played at least one official international match for his senior national team at any time.

- (Bulgaria) Georgi Boyanov
- (Lithuania) Karolis Babkauskas
- (United States) Kenneth Cooper
- (United States) Terry Evans
- (United States) Jeff Harper
- (United States) Mike Holton Jr.
