= Berlin 380-kV electric line =

Power cable in Germany

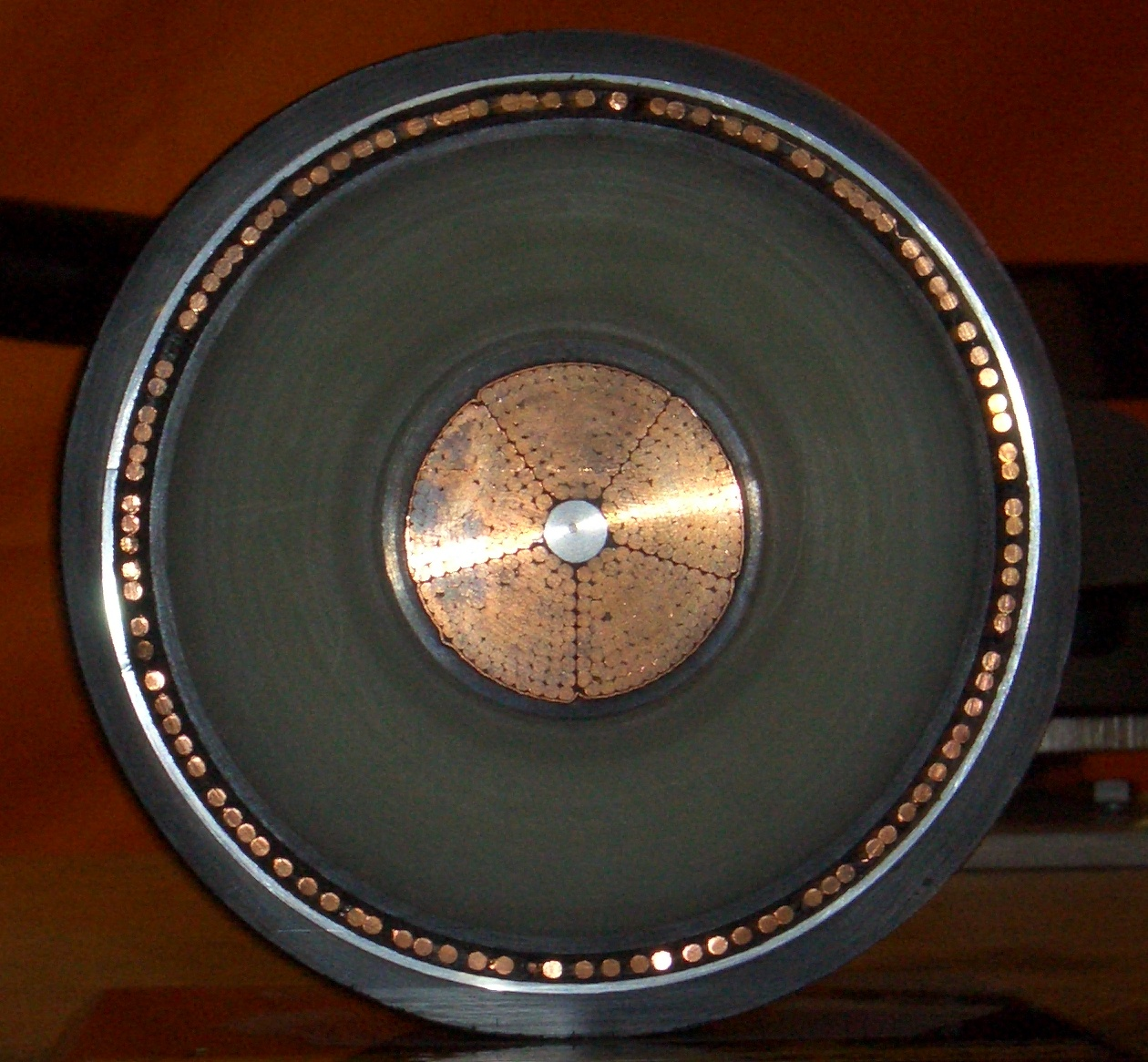
Cross section of a 400 kV cable

The Berlin 380 kV electric line is a 38.3-km double-circuit high-voltage electric three-phase power line in Berlin. An unusual system for a municipality, it was installed by the West Berlin Bewag utility company during the division of the city. Since 1951, West Berlin had been cut off from the East Berlin and East German power networks, and maintained an independent power generation capacity that was not connected to any other power grid. Berlin was connected to the western European power grid in 1994, following German reunification, by extending the 380 kV line.

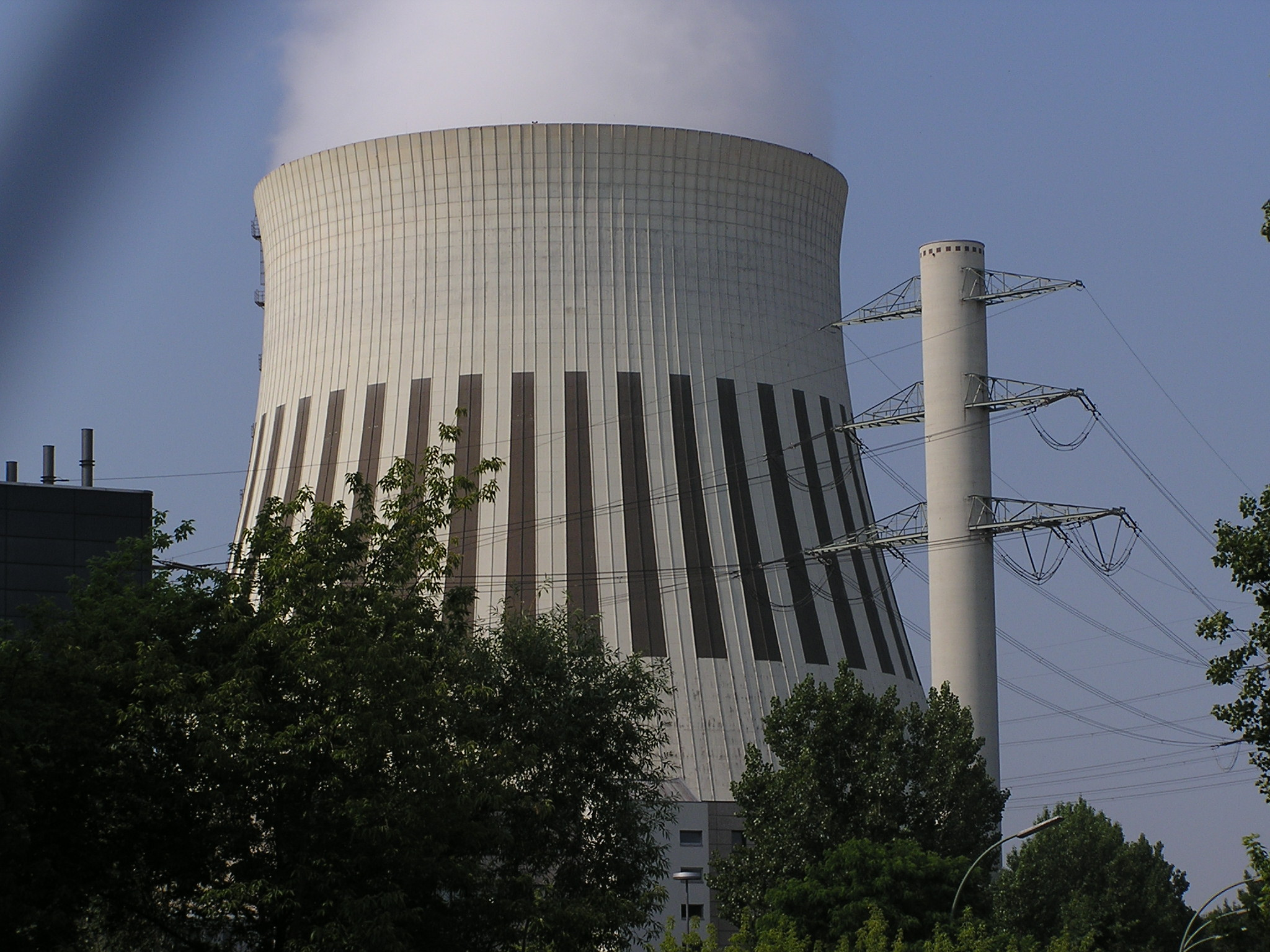
Concrete / steel lattice tower next to the Reuter West cooling tower

The first section of the line, which entered service in 1977, was an interconnector that consisted of a 2.6 km overhead transmission line and an 8.1 km underground cable, which ran from Reuter power station in Spandau to Mitte substation in Tiergarten ("Mitte" means "central"; the district of Berlin-Mitte was then in East Berlin). It was the first time plastic insulators had been used. The overhead segment and an adjacent 110-kV line are the only overhead lines in former West Berlin. The underground section used water-cooled cable in an accessible tunnel. Both substations use totally enclosed SF_{6}-insulated switchgear. They are the oldest 380 kV substations with SF_{6} technology in Germany. Another speciality of the Berlin power grid is that the first pylon near Reuter power station has been built as a 66-metre-high (217 ft) concrete structure with transversal steel lattice mimicking a chimney for aesthetic reasons.

After German reunification the line was extended 7.6 km further west to Teufelsbruch substation in Spandau Forest, near Berlin's western border, in 1994. The city was finally relinked to the western German power grid via a new 170 km (106 mi) transmission line to Helmstedt, just across the former inner-German border.

At the same time, the 380 kV line was extended into former East Berlin via a 6.3 km (3.9 mi) tunnel to Friedrichshain substation (1998), extended 5.2 km to Marzahn substation in 2000. From Marzahn substation a 12 km long 380 kV overhead powerline was built in 1998 to Neuenhagen substation east of Berlin in order to create a second connector to the Western European grid. The tunnel is up to 30 m deep, and has a small inspection railway. After the line was complete, several overhead lines in former East Berlin were dismantled. There are plans for further 380 kV lines to other parts of the high voltage grid north and west of Berlin.

== Map ==
Location of the 380 kV transversal line's components
