= Else Ackermann =

German politician and pharmacologist (1933–2019)

Member of the Bundestag
- In office 3 October 1990 – 20 December 1990
- In office 22 October 1991 – 10 November 1994

Personal details
- Born: 6 November 1933 Berlin, Germany
- Died: 14 September 2019 (aged 85) Neuenhagen bei Berlin, Germany
- Party: Christian Democratic Union (East Germany) (1985–1990); Christian Democratic Union of Germany (from 1990)
- Occupation: Physician; pharmacologist; politician

Else Ackermann (6 November 1933 – 14 September 2019) was a German physician and pharmacologist who became an East German politician (Christian Democratic Union of Germany). The report on the power relationships between the citizen and the state which she drafted, and in 1988 presented, known as the "Neuenhagen Letter", was a significant precursor to the changes of 1989 which led to the ending, in the early summer of 1990, of the one-party system, followed by German reunification later that same year.

== Life ==
=== Career ===
Ackermann was born in Berlin towards the end of 1933, the year during which Germany transitioned to one- party dictatorship. Her father was a railway official: her mother was a nurse. Ackermann passed her secondary school final exams (Abitur) at the "Einstein Upper School" in the Berlin suburb of Neuenhagen in 1952 which opened the way to a university-level education. In September of that same year she moved on to the Charité clinic which was, and remains, in effect the medical faculty of the Humboldt University in Berlin, where she studied medicine. After the Second World War the entire eastern part of Berlin, which included Humboldt University, had ended up administered as part of the Soviet occupation zone after 1949.

Ackermann passed her state medical exams in 1957 and received her doctorate in medicine in 1958. During this period, between 1957 and 1959, she undertook her clinical training in a hospital. That was followed by a training in pharmacology and toxicology while working as an academic assistant at the Charité between 1960 and 1965. During 1965 she relocated to Dresden, appointed to a position as a senior research assistant at the "Carl Gustav Carus" Medical Academy (as it was known at that time) where she remained for a decade, until 1975. During this period in 1969 she obtained her habilitation. This was the first habilitation awarded for Clinical Pharmacology in Germany, and she received it for work on "Microsomal electron transport in the human liver". After that, in 1971 she received a full lectureship at the "Carl Gustav Carus" academy. Returning to the Berlin area, between 1975 and 1989 Ackermann worked as a senior research assistant with the Central Institute for Cancer Research at the (East) German Academy of Sciences, based in the Buch quarter, in the northern part of Berlin. She was able to combine the research work at the Cancer Research Institute with a lectureship contract at the Charité.

=== Politics ===
In 1985 Ackermann became a member of the East German version of the Christian Democratic Union ("Christlich-Demokratische Union Deutschlands" / CDU). Since the late 1940s the Christian Democratic Union of Germany had become one of ten bloc parties and mass organisations with seats in the East German national parliament (Volkstag). Seats were allocated according to fixed quotas, without reference to "election results", by the ruling Socialist Unity Party ("Sozialistische Einheitspartei Deutschlands" / SED), which also controlled the bloc parties through an administrative structure called the National Front. In the central European countries that based their political structures on the highly centralised Leninist model that had been implemented in the Soviet Union during the 1920s and 1930s, national parliaments had little power, but the fact that they were seen to include members from a range of "political parties" and popular movements helped to widen the visible power base which formed one of the pillars underpinning the government's legitimacy. In 1986 Ackermann became the chairwoman for the local Christian Democratic Union of Germany in Neuenhagen, her home town. The Neuenhagen Christian Democratic Union of Germany was an unusually active local branch, with a membership of sixty, all of whom could be relied upon to appear for the annual Christmas celebrations. However, only around fifteen turned up regularly for meetings and contributed significantly to party activities.

It was, Ackermann indicated, partly in order to try and broaden participation from the local party membership, that from the time she took over chairmanship of the local party in 1986, she arranged for a series of relatively "provocative" presentations to take place, linked by the theme "Do we need more democracy?" ("Brauchen wir mehr Demokratie?"). In June 1988, as chair of the Neuenhagen local party, Ackermann sent an internal letter to Gerald Götting, the Christian Democratic Union party national chairman in Berlin. There may have been input from fellow members, but it is widely assumed that the text of what came to be known as the "Neuenhagen letter" was composed by Ackermann herself. The theme of the letter was reform ("der Reformprozess"). It identified an institutionalised resistance to reform. Local party members could in some ways be taken as a microcosm for East German society as a whole. In personal conversations, where the "psychological barriers" presented by public discussion could be set aside, you would find the concerns, anxieties, irritations, disappointments, and political disagreements that you would find in the wider population and in workplaces, together with more positive attitudes and other joys. But none of the "opinion research" undertaken by one-on-one conversations was reflected in the state institutions or in the state-controlled media. The closely thought through "beef" of the letter was divided into four sections:

1. The growing wave of emigration pressure and its handling by the state authorities ("Die Ausreise-und Reisewelle in der DDR und ihre Handhabung durch den Apparat "),
2. Absence of any spirit of [political] pluralism ("Der fehlende geistige Pluralismus"),
3. The condition of representative democracy ("Der Stand der Vertretungsdemokratie,") and
4. The church/state relationship.

Back in the early 1950s, as the East German leadership struggled to impose itself, the "Neuenberger letter" might have led to arrest and imprisonment or worse. Back then the leadership were confident that they could rely, where necessary, on fraternal Soviet intervention to impose order, as happened in 1953. In the 1980s, however, with the winds of Perestroika blowing across from, of all places, Moscow, there could be no such confidence. In shared export markets the Soviet Union and East German were increasingly coming across one another as commercial rivals, while at the government level the personal relationships between the two leaderships were terrible. The East German leadership, therefore, lacked the iron confidence to impose its will uncompromisingly on dissenters. Nevertheless, authorship of the "Neuenhagen latter" did not come without personal cost to Ackermann. The Ministry for State security launched an Operativer Vorgang (loosely:"operational process") against her. Research projects on which she was working were cut. On 13 April 1989, on flimsy grounds, she lost the post to which she had been promoted at the (East) German Academy of Sciences as deputy section leader of the Central Institute for Cancer Research. She had to reckon with the constant possibility that her car would be tampered with overnight.

Ackermann did not withdraw from politics, however, and her actions were indeed part of a wider series of changes, although it was hard to anticipate exactly where those changes were leading. In May 1989 she stood successfully as a Christian Democratic Union candidate for election to the local council in Neuenhagen. In October 1989 she was one of those who called for an "extraordinary Christian Democratic Union party conference", and on 31 October 1989 she was one of the Christian Democratic Union members who met at a little Lutheran priory on the eastern outskirts of Berlin to prepare for a visit to Gerald Götting the next day. This led, finally, to the resignation of Götting as party leader on 2 November 1989, to be replaced by Lothar de Maizière. On 9 November 1989 protesters breached the Berlin Wall. It quickly became apparent that the Soviet troops in East Germany had received no orders to intervene, and the future trajectory of the Peaceful Revolution became a little clearer. In January 1990 Ackermann found herself invited to resume her teaching at the Charité where, in August 1991, she took over as acting director of the Pharmacology-Toxicology Institute.

In Neuenhagen, newly elected to the local council, Ackermann participated in local round table negotiations, as the politically engaged struggled to find a path ahead. In March 1990 the German Democratic Republic held its first (and, as matters turned out, last) freely conducted general election. Else Ackermann stood for election as a Christian Democratic Union candidate and was elected, representing the Frankfurt (Oder) electoral district in the National Parliament (Volkskammer).

German reunification formally took place in October 1990. This was accompanied by a dissolution of the East German Volkskammer, and the transfer of 144 (out of the 400 former members) Volkskammer members into an enlarged German Bundestag. Those making the transfer, which included Elise Ackermann, were elected by fellow members. The East German Christian Democratic Union had leap-frogged into first place in the March election, as a result of which 71 of the 144 eastern members transferring to the Bundestag on 3 October 1990 came from the eastern Christian Democratic Union and its close ally, the German Social Union. The eastern and western CDUs were now merged, leaving Ackermann as a member of the pan-German Christian Democratic Union. She remained a Bundestag member until the general election which took place in December 1990.

=== After reunification ===
Ackermann found herself back in the Bundestag in October 1991 following the resignation from the assembly of Lothar de Maizière, who had served as East Germany's last prime minister during the summer of the previous year. Ackermann was selected to take on her former colleague's Brandenburg seat. She now remained a member till the 1994 election after which she withdrew from national politics, though she remained politically active in her own region.

Ackermann returned to the Charité, was appointed a director in 1994, and remained engaged as a teacher at the medical faculty's Institute for Clinical Pharmacology till her retirement in 1998. She had also remained a member of the local council in Neuenhagen since 1989, and in 1996 she was elected chair of the Christian Democratic Union party group on the council. In Summer 2007 she resigned the chair after the majority of the group had indicated that the time had come for a change. Press reports indicated that this came as the culmination of a period of internal ructions in the group who had as much to do with personality differences as with policy differences. In September 2007 Ackermann also resigned her party membership. Her fellow council member, Susanne Ahrens, withdrew her support from the Christian Democratic Union faction in the council at the same time. They formed an alternative grouping which they called the "Christlich soziale Frauen" ("Christian Social Women"). Else Ackermann explained the move by criticising the misogynistic attitude of her replacement as Christian Democratic Union group leader on the council, Alfred Kuck, and some of his male colleagues. The local party reacted by submitting a motion at state level calling for Ackermann's exclusion from the party. Ackermann pointed out that she had already resigned. A certain amount of rancour was on very public display. Pointing out that the reason that she had retained her position with the Christian Democratic Union group on the Neuenhagen council was that she was the one who had always attracted the votes in local elections ("Ich habe immer die Stimmen geholt"), she again stood as a candidate for the local council in the 2008 municipal elections, now representing the "New Neuenhagen Citizen's Alliance" ("Neue Bürger Allianz Neuenhagen" /NBA). This time her candidacy was not successful, and she resigned from the NBA in February 2009.

Meanwhile, the motion submitted by the Neuenhagen party to have Ackermann excluded from the Christian Democratic Union was rejected by the party state leadership for Brandenburg. Ackermann was handed a reprimand for conduct damaging to the party and remained a Christian Democratic Union of Germany member.

== Honour ==
In 2014 Ackermann became the first recipient of the Wilhelm Wolf prize. Wilhelm Wolf was the first regional chairman of the regional Christian Democratic Union of Germany in Brandenburg. He was killed in a motor accident in 1948, under circumstances that were never clearly explained during the period when Brandenburg was part of the Soviet occupation zone and the authorities were implementing a carefully crafted plan to impose one- party rule.
