= Babkauskas =

- Lithuanian surname
- m.: Babkauskas
- f.: (married): Babkauskienė
- Related names: Bobkowski, Bobkovsky

Babkauskas is a Lithuanian surname. Notable people with the surname include:

- Aurimas Babkauskas (19246-1991), Lithuanian film and stage actor
- Bronius Babkauskas (1921–1975), Lithuanian film and stage actor
- Karolis Babkauskas (born 1991), Lithuanian professional basketball player
