= Stahnsdorf =

- Municipality
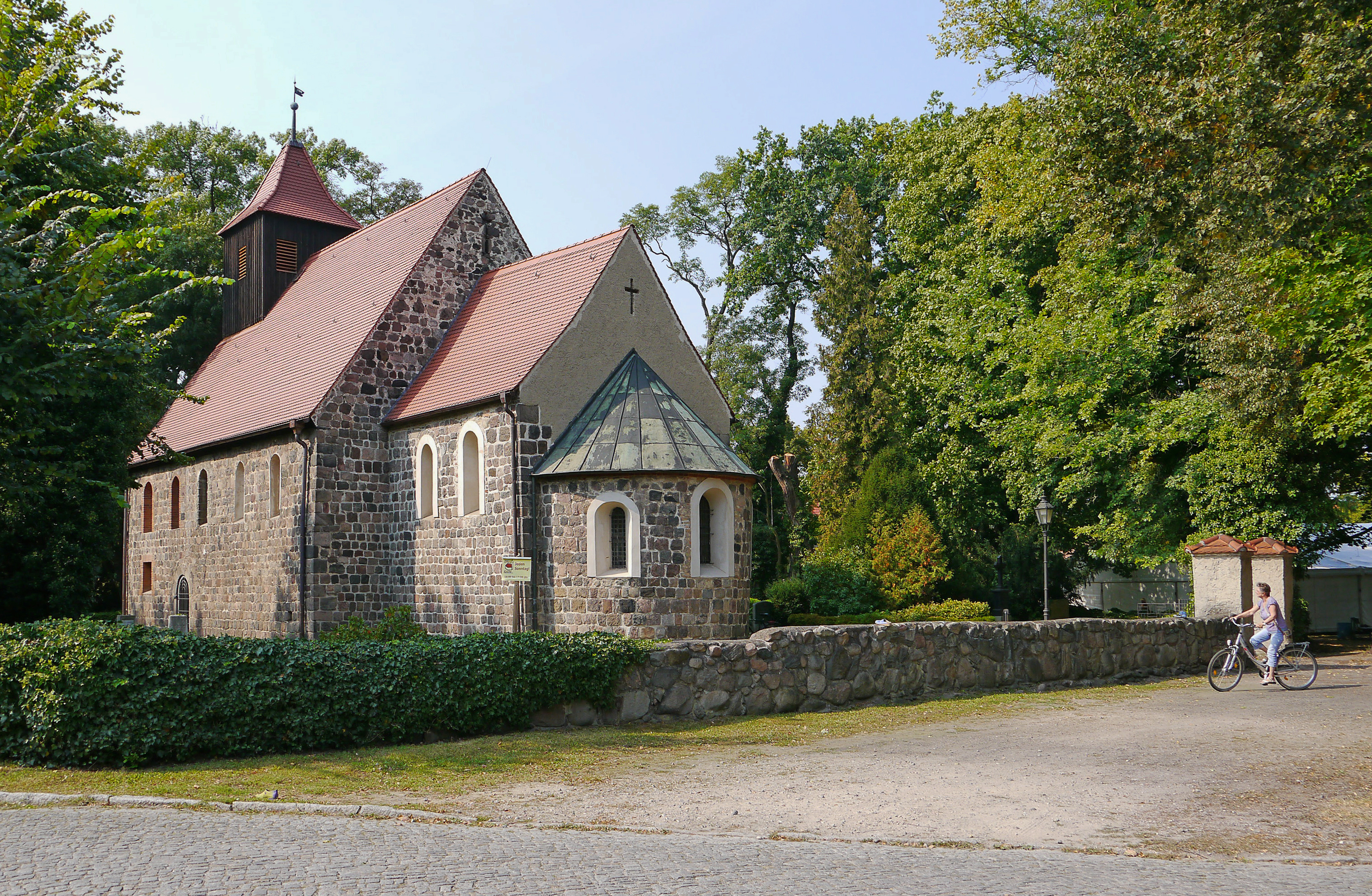
- Stahnsdorf village church

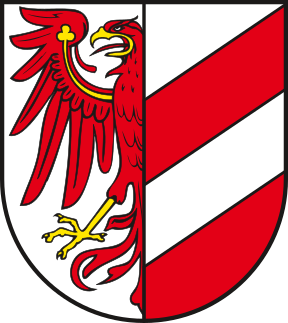
- Coat of arms

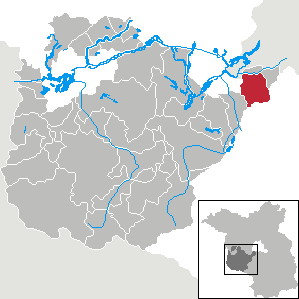
- Location of Stahnsdorf within Potsdam-Mittelmark district
- Interactive map of Stahnsdorf
- Location within Germany Location within Brandenburg
- Coordinates: 52°23′32″N 13°13′00″E
- Country: Germany
- State: Brandenburg
- District: Potsdam-Mittelmark
- Subdivisions: 4 Quarters

Government
  - Mayor (2024–32): Bernd Albers

Area
  - Total: 49.47 km^{2} (19.10 sq mi)
- Elevation: 44 m (144 ft)

Population (2025-12-31)
  - Total: 16,041
  - Density: 324.3/km^{2} (839.8/sq mi)
- Time zone: UTC+01:00 (CET)
  - Summer (DST): UTC+02:00 (CEST)
- Postal codes: 14532
- Dialling codes: 03329
- Vehicle registration: PM
- Website: stahnsdorf.de

Stahnsdorf (German pronunciation: [ˈʃtaːnsdɔʁf]) is a municipality in the Potsdam-Mittelmark district, in Brandenburg, Germany.

== Geography ==
It is situated on the Teltow plateau, about 20 km (12 mi) southwest of the Berlin city centre, and 12 km (7.5 mi) east of Potsdam. Neighbouring municipalities are the town of Teltow in the east and Kleinmachnow in the north, both immediately bordering the Berlin city limits.

The municipal area is bound by the Teltow Canal in the north. It comprises Stahnsdorf proper and the villages of Güterfelde, Schenkenhorst, and Sputendorf.

== History ==
Stahnsdorf in the Margraviate of Brandenburg was first documented in a 1264 purchase contract of Margrave Otto III and the Brandenburg bishop. It originally consisted only of its old village green on a formerly important merchant road from Leipzig in Saxony via Güterfelde and Stahnsdorf, crossing the Bäke creek (the present-day Teltow Canal) at Kleinmachnow, and running northwards to Spandau.

With the construction of the Teltow Canal in the early 20th century, the opening of the large Stahnsdorf South-Western Cemetery in April 1909, the Wilmersdorfer Waldfriedhof and Friedenauer Waldfriedhof in 1913, and the opening of the S-Bahn route from Berlin-Wannsee station in June 1913 the development in a Berlin suburb began. In the following decades, the current site was created by the development of privately owned homes, the connection to Berlin-Lichterfelde by a tram and building a settlement for workers at the Bosch manufactures in Kleinmachnow.

In 1920 the Stahnsdorf Military Cemetery was formalised. It contains 1175 graves, mainly of British POWs who died in captivity. It was designed by Sir Robert Lorimer.

1931 Stahnsdorf WWTP was put into operation, where waste water from the south of Berlin was treated. It was one of the first plants to produce biogas.

The construction of the Berlin Wall on 13 August 1961 severed the connections to the bordering Berlin. In the communist era, the place was dominated economically, especially through the semiconductor business as a major operation and farms. The fall of the Berlin Wall set a renewing development by inflows, opening new home communities, and in recent years by commercial development, particularly in "Green Park", a large industrial park.

On 1 January 2002 Stahnsdorf in its present form was formed by the incorporation of the towns Güterfelde, Schenkenhorst and Sputendorf.

== Demography ==
Development of population since 1875 within the current Boundaries (Blue Line: Population; Dotted Line: Comparison to Population development in Brandenburg state; Grey Background: Time of Nazi Germany; Red Background: Time of communist East Germany)

Recent Population Development and Projections (Population Development before Census 2011 (blue line); Recent Population Development according to the Census in Germany in 2011 (blue bordered line); Official projections for 2005-2030 (yellow line); for 2017-2030 (scarlet line); for 2020-2030 (green line)

Stahnsdorf: Population development
within the current boundaries (2020)

Year	Pop.	±% p.a.
1875	1,488	—
1890	1,495	+0.03%
1910	2,746	+3.09%
1925	3,399	+1.43%
1939	8,391	+6.67%
1950	8,900	+0.54%
1964	8,820	−0.06%

Year	Pop.	±% p.a.
1971	8,869	+0.08%
1981	8,341	−0.61%
1985	8,120	−0.67%
1990	7,938	−0.45%
1995	9,431	+3.51%
2000	11,506	+4.06%
2005	13,235	+2.84%

Year	Pop.	±% p.a.
2010	14,210	+1.43%
2015	15,127	+1.26%
2016	15,240	+0.75%
2017	15,270	+0.20%
2018	15,243	−0.18%
2019	15,371	+0.84%
2020	15,756	+2.50%

== Politics ==
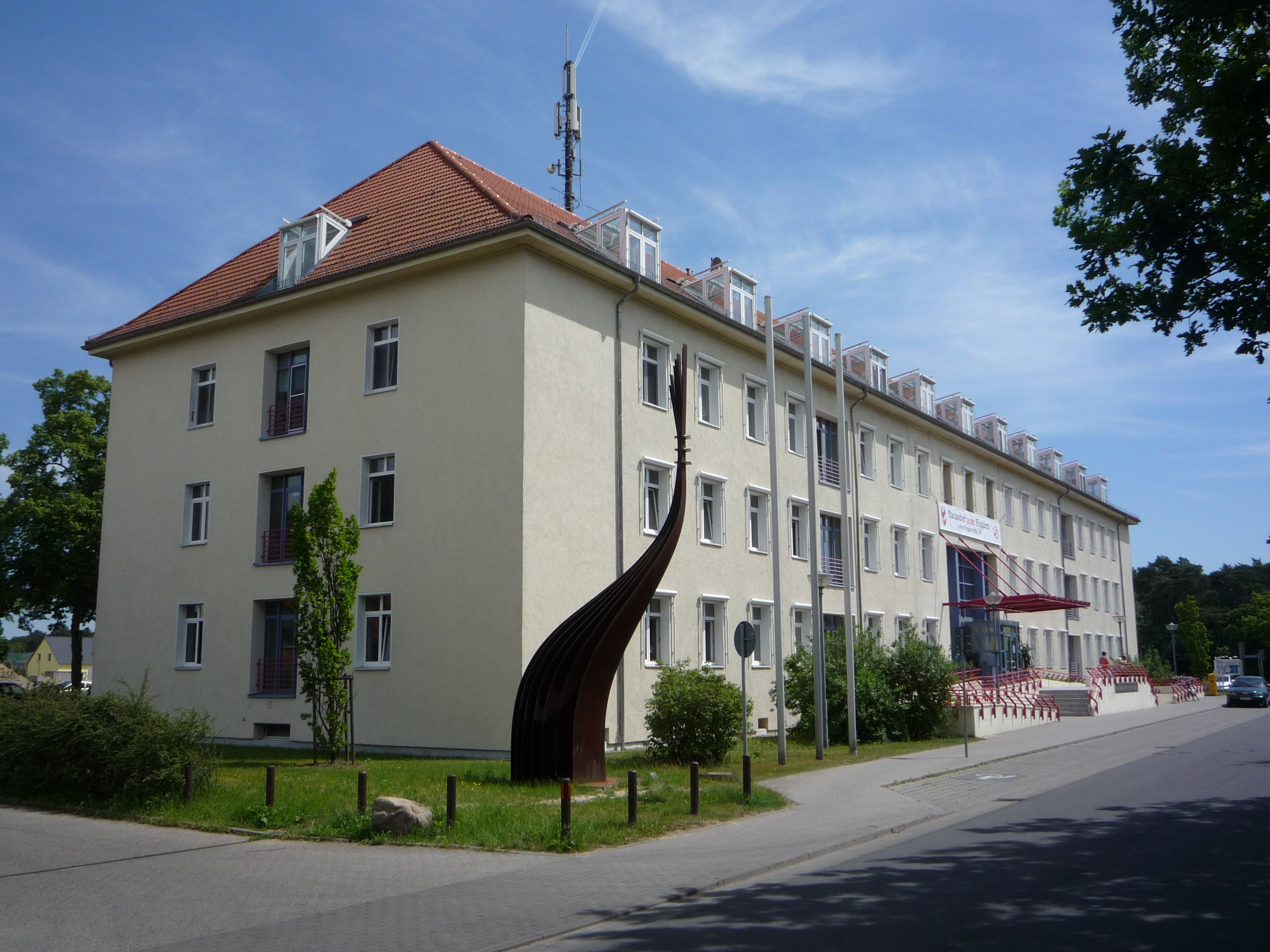
Town hall

Seats in the municipal assembly (Gemeindevertretung) as of 2014 local elections:

- Bürger für Bürger (Independent): 7
- Christian Democratic Union of Germany (CDU): 5
- Social Democratic Party of Germany (SPD): 3
- Wir Vier (Independent): 2
- Alliance '90/The Greens: 2
- The Left: 2
- Alternative for Germany (AfD): 1

== Sports ==
Stahnsdorf is one of the three home towns of the basketball team TKS 49ers.
