= Berlin-Mahlsdorf station =

Railway station in Berlin, Germany

Coordinates: 52.5120°N 13.6099°E

Berlin Mahlsdorf
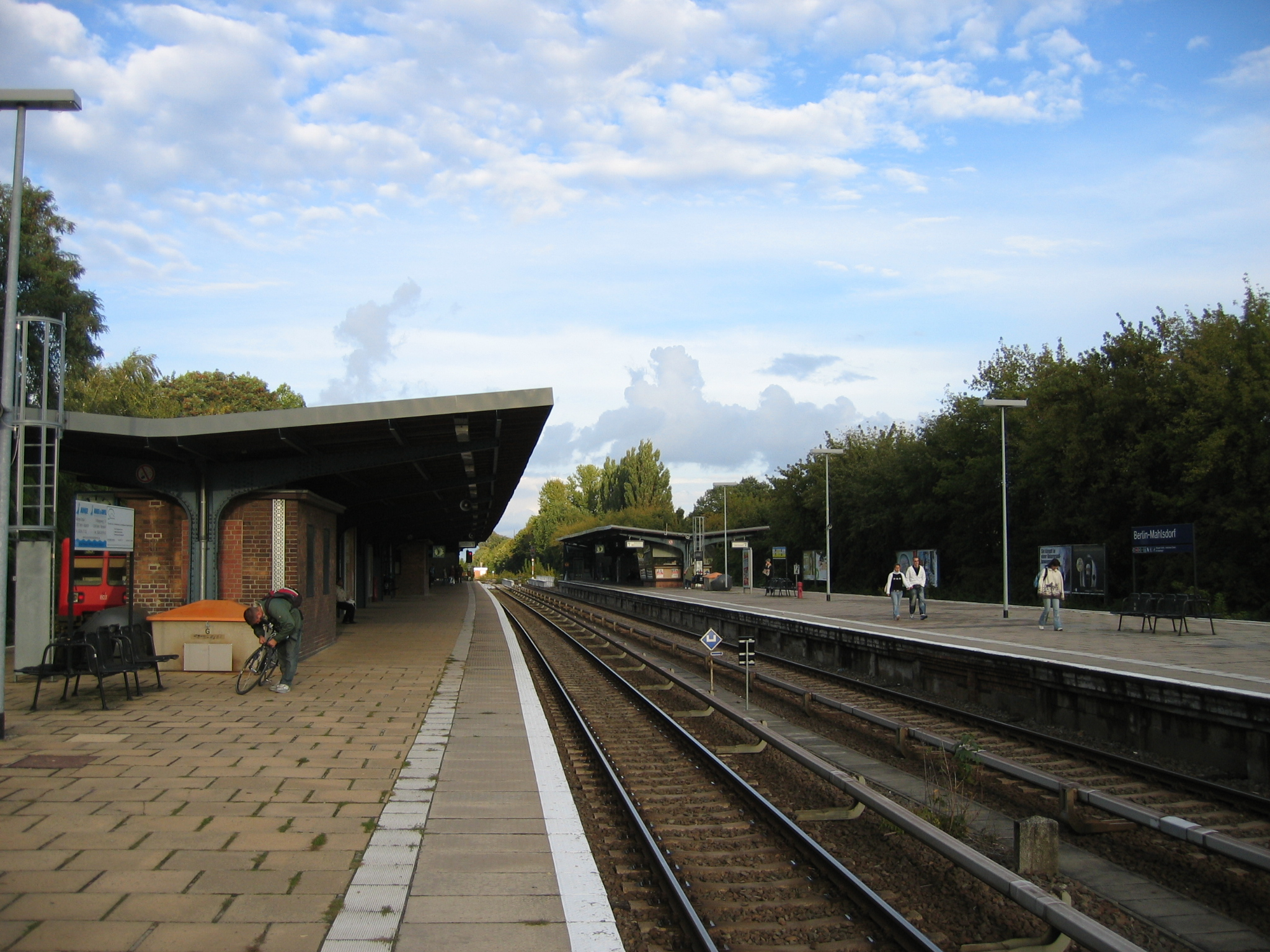

General information
- Location: Hönower Str. 83-85; 12623 Berlin; Berlin; Mahlsdorf; Germany
- Operator: DB Station&Service
- Line: Prussian Eastern Railway
- Platforms: 2 island platforms 1 side platform
- Tracks: 5
- Train operators: S-Bahn Berlin; Niederbarnimer Eisenbahn
- Connections: 62 63(Limited); 195 197 395 398 N90 N95

Other information
- Station code: 551
- DS100 code: BMDF, BMHL
- IBNR: 8089072
- Category: 4
- Fare zone: VBB: Berlin B/5656
- Website: www.bahnhof.de

Services
| Preceding station | Niederbarnimer Eisenbahn | Following station |
|---|---|---|
| Berlin-Lichtenberg towards Berlin Ostkreuz | RB 26 | Strausberg towards Kostrzyn |
| Preceding station | Berlin S-Bahn | Following station |
| Kaulsdorf towards Westkreuz | S5 | Birkenstein towards Strausberg Nord |
Location

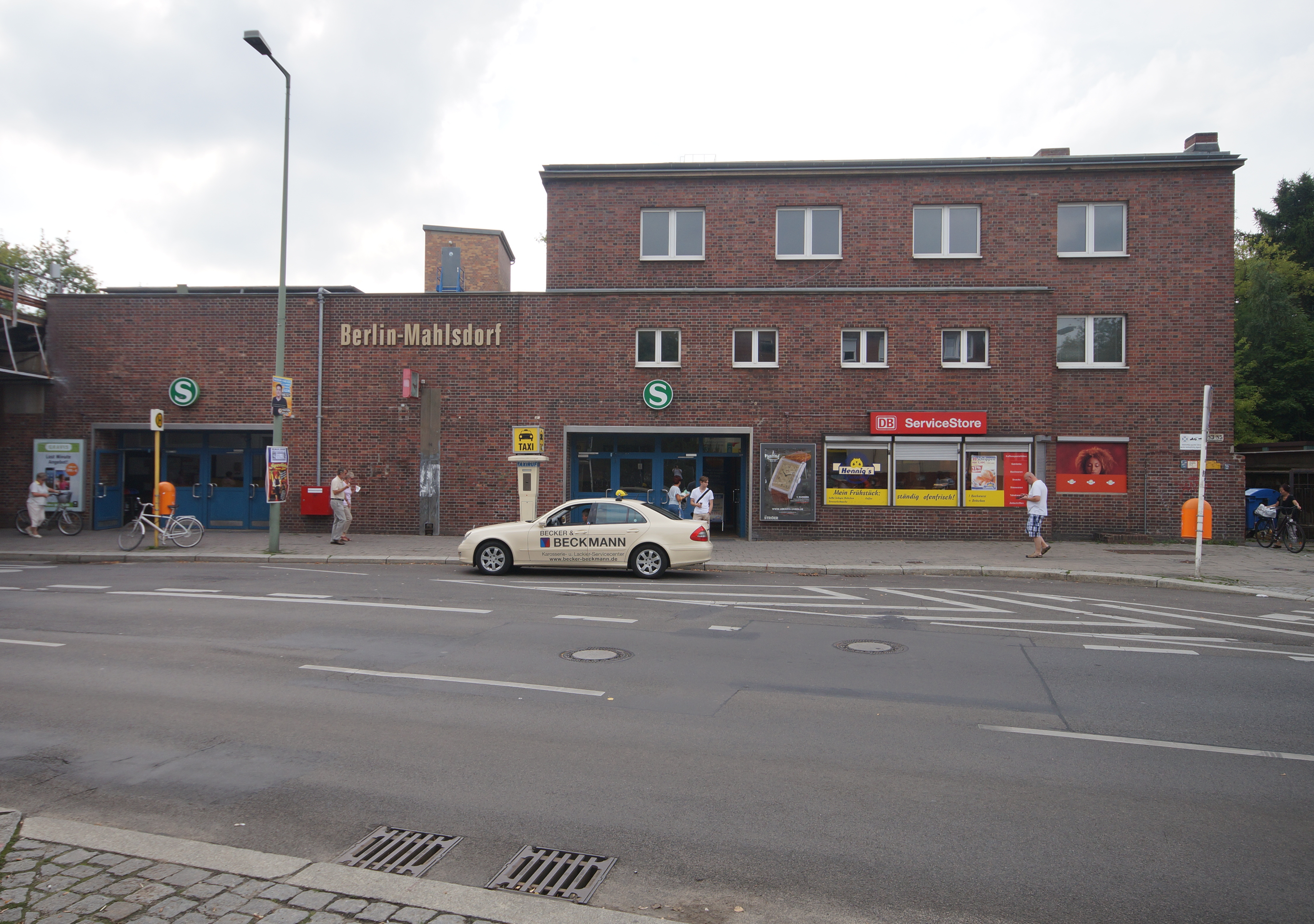
Station entrance

Berlin-Mahlsdorf is a railway station in the Marzahn-Hellersdorf district of Berlin. It is served by the S-Bahn line S5.

It is the terminus for every second train during regular daytime service.
