= Berlin Brandenburg International School =

Coordinates: 52.401°N 13.222°E

BBIS Berlin Brandenburg International School

Location
- Schopfheimer Allee 10; Kleinmachnow, 14532; Germany

Information
- Type: Private, Day & Boarding; International school
- Established: 1990
- Director: Beth Dressler
- Grades: P–12
- Gender: Coeducational
- Enrolment: 915 (2013-14)
- Campus size: 100 acres (0.40 km^{2})
- Campus type: Rural
- Song: Build a Bridge
- Website: www.bbis.de

BBIS Berlin Brandenburg International School is an IB World School. The school was established 1990 in Potsdam, Germany, but is now located in Kleinmachnow, between Berlin and Potsdam, 17 kilometres (11 mi) to Berlin (Mitte) and 20 kilometres (12 mi) to Potsdam. English is the language of instruction at BBIS, meaning that all subjects, including mathematics, drama, humanities, design technology, music, visual art, etc. are taught in English. The school is divided into Early Education, Primary and Secondary School. BBIS Berlin Brandenburg International School is led by Beth Dressler (CEO) and Achim Härtling (COO). Around 915 students are enrolled.
