= Hoppegarten =

Municipality in Brandenburg, Germany

- Municipality
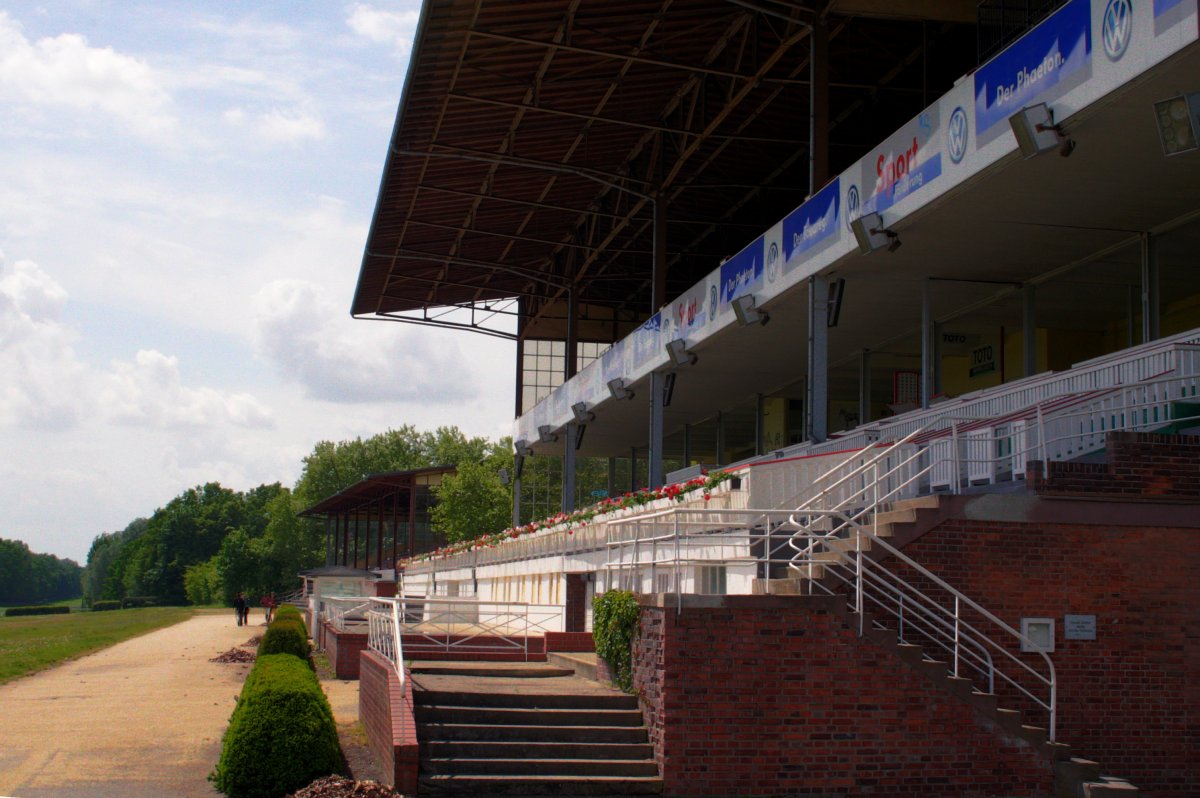
- The Hippodrome

- Coat of arms

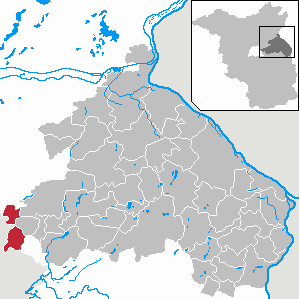
- Location of Hoppegarten within Märkisch-Oderland district
- Interactive map of Hoppegarten
- Location within Germany Location within Brandenburg
- Coordinates: 52°31′00″N 13°40′00″E
- Country: Germany
- State: Brandenburg
- District: Märkisch-Oderland
- Subdivisions: 3 Ortsteile

Government
  - Mayor (2019–27): Sven Siebert

Area
  - Total: 31.98 km^{2} (12.35 sq mi)
- Elevation: 50 m (160 ft)

Population (2025-12-31)
  - Total: 18,085
  - Density: 565.5/km^{2} (1,465/sq mi)
- Time zone: UTC+01:00 (CET)
  - Summer (DST): UTC+02:00 (CEST)
- Postal codes: 15366
- Dialling codes: 03342, 030
- Vehicle registration: MOL
- Website: gemeinde-hoppegarten.de

Hoppegarten (German pronunciation: [ˈhɔpəɡaʁtn̩]) is a municipality in the district Märkisch-Oderland, in Brandenburg, Germany.

== History ==
The current municipality was created in 2003 when the former municipalities of Hönow and Münchehofe were united with Dahlwitz-Hoppegarten. The old Dahlwitz-Hoppegarten is now a district composed by Birkenstein and Waldesruh.

== Geography ==
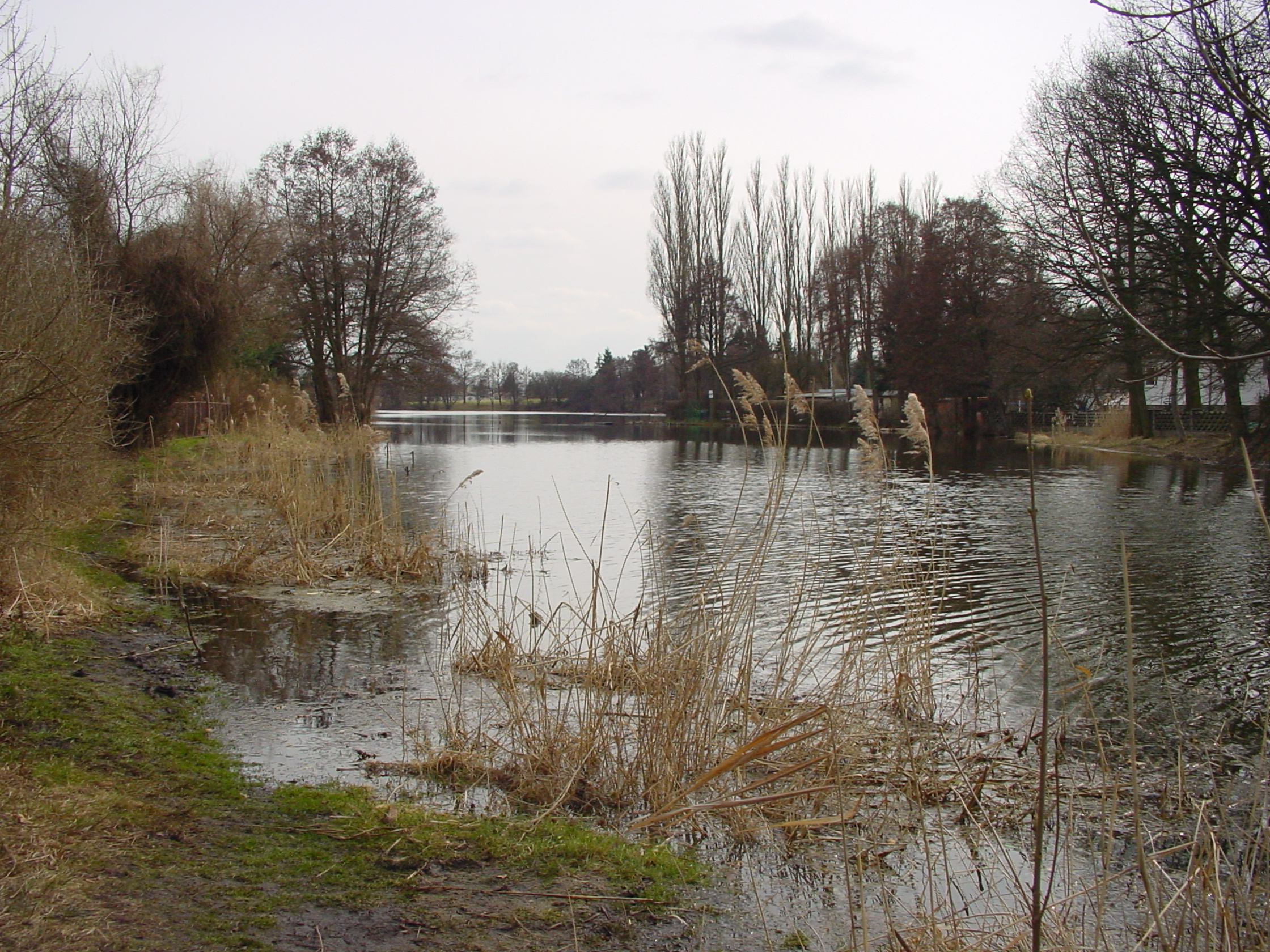
Haussee lake at Hönow

Hoppegarten is located close to the eastern suburbs of Berlin (Mahlsdorf, in the borough of Marzahn-Hellersdorf). The other bordering municipalities are Ahrensfelde (BAR), Werneuchen (BAR), Altlandsberg, Neuenhagen, and Schöneiche (LOS).

The municipality is composed by three urban districts (Ortsteil): Dahlwitz-Hoppegarten, Hönow (detached from the rest of municipal area by a strip belonging to Berlin), and Münchehofe.

== Transport ==
The town is served by Berlin S-Bahn and it has 2 stations on S5 line (Birkenstein and Hoppegarten). The Berlin U-Bahn line U5 has its end station in Hönow.

== Demography ==
Development of population since 1875 within the current boundaries (blue line: population; dotted line: comparison to population development of Brandenburg state; grey background: time of Nazi rule; red background: time of communist rule)

Recent population development and projections (population development before 2011 census (blue line); recent population development according to the Census in Germany in 2011 (blue bordered line); official projections for 2005-2030 (yellow line); for 2017-2030 (scarlet line); for 2020-2030 (green line)

Hoppegarten: Population development
within the current boundaries (2020)

Year	Pop.	±% p.a.
1875	1,312	—
1890	1,604	+1.35%
1910	2,363	+1.96%
1925	3,312	+2.28%
1939	6,763	+5.23%
1950	6,837	+0.10%
1964	7,065	+0.23%

Year	Pop.	±% p.a.
1971	7,060	−0.01%
1981	6,921	−0.20%
1985	6,689	−0.85%
1990	6,283	−1.24%
1995	7,379	+3.27%
2000	12,221	+10.62%
2005	14,715	+3.78%

Year	Pop.	±% p.a.
2010	16,802	+2.69%
2015	17,636	+0.97%
2016	17,806	+0.96%
2017	17,966	+0.90%
2018	18,048	+0.46%
2019	18,079	+0.17%
2020	18,202	+0.68%

== Twin towns ==
- Iffezheim (Germany)
- Rzepin (Poland)

== See also ==
- Hönow
- Hoppegarten railway station
- Birkenstein railway station
- Hönow railway station
