= Hoppegarten (Mark) station =

Railway station in Germany

Coordinates: 52.5183°N 13.6734°E

Hoppegarten (Mark)
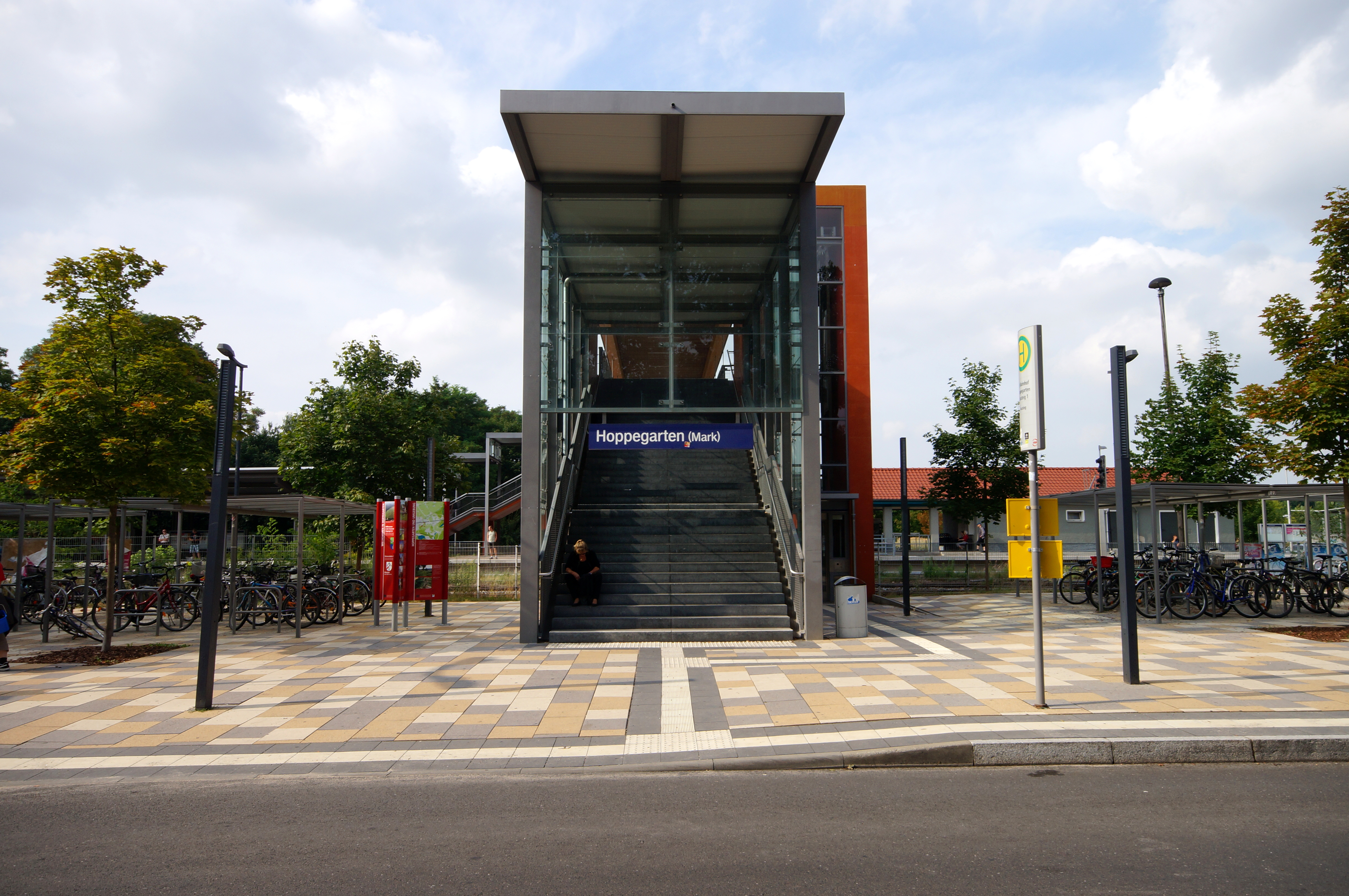

General information
- Location: Hoppegarten, Brandenburg; Germany
- Owner: DB Netz
- Operator: DB Station&Service
- Line: Prussian Eastern Railway
- Platforms: 1 island platform
- Tracks: 2
- Train operators: S-Bahn Berlin
- Connections: 940 942 943 944 945

Other information
- Station code: 2901
- DS100 code: BHPN
- IBNR: 8080750
- Category: 4
- Fare zone: VBB: Berlin C/5460
- Website: www.bahnhof.de

History
- Opened: 1 May 1870; 156 years ago

Services
Preceding station	Berlin S-Bahn	Following station
Birkenstein towards Westkreuz	S5	Neuenhagen towards Strausberg Nord
Location

Hoppegarten (Mark) (simply known as Hoppegarten) is a railway station located in Hoppegarten, in the Märkisch-Oderland district of Brandenburg. It is served by the S-Bahn line S5.

During peak hours, every 2nd train terminates at this station.
