= 2012 LKL Three-point Shootout =

3 point shootout basketball tournament in lithuania in 2012

The 2012 LKL Three-point Shootout was an event part of the LKL All-Star Day that took place in Klaipėda's Švyturys Arena on March 2. The winner of this event was Žygimantas Šeštokas of BC Juventus.

== Results ==
This contest resembled the NBA Three-point Shootout. Five racks of basketball were set up at five different angles around the basket. Each contestant was given a minute to attempt 25 three-pointers. Each rack contained five basketballs. The first four basketballs in each rack, if made, were worth 1 point, while the last basketball was worth 2 points. The results of this contest are documented below:

Name	Team	Prelims	Semifinal	Final	Rank
(Lithuania) Žygimantas Šeštokas	Juventus Utena	20	20	24	1
(Serbia) Aleksandar Rašić	Lietuvos Rytas	20	22	17	2
(Lithuania) Vytenis Jasikevičius	Nevėžis Kėdainiai	20	19	–	3
(Lithuania) Karolis Babkauskas	Lietkabelis	21	16	–	4
(Lithuania) Marius Runkauskas	Neptūnas Klaipėda	19	–	–	5
(Lithuania) Mantas Kalnietis	Žalgiris Kaunas	18	–	–	6
(Croatia) Marko Popović	Žalgiris Kaunas	17	–	–	7
(Lithuania) Gediminas Orelikas	Rūdupis Prienai	16	–	–	8
(Lithuania) Eimantas Bendžius	Pieno žvaigždės	15	–	–	9
(Lithuania) Algirdas Gydra	Sakalai Vilnius	15	–	–	9
(Lithuania) Edvinas Ruzgas	Šiauliai	14	–	–	11
(Lithuania) Tomas Rinkevičius	Naglis Palanga	13	–	–	12
(Lithuania) Jonas Mačiulis	Baltai Kaunas	10	–	–	13
