= Neuenhagen station =

Railway station in Neuenhagen bei Berlin, Germany

Coordinates: 52.5208°N 13.7002°E

Neuenhagen (b Berlin)
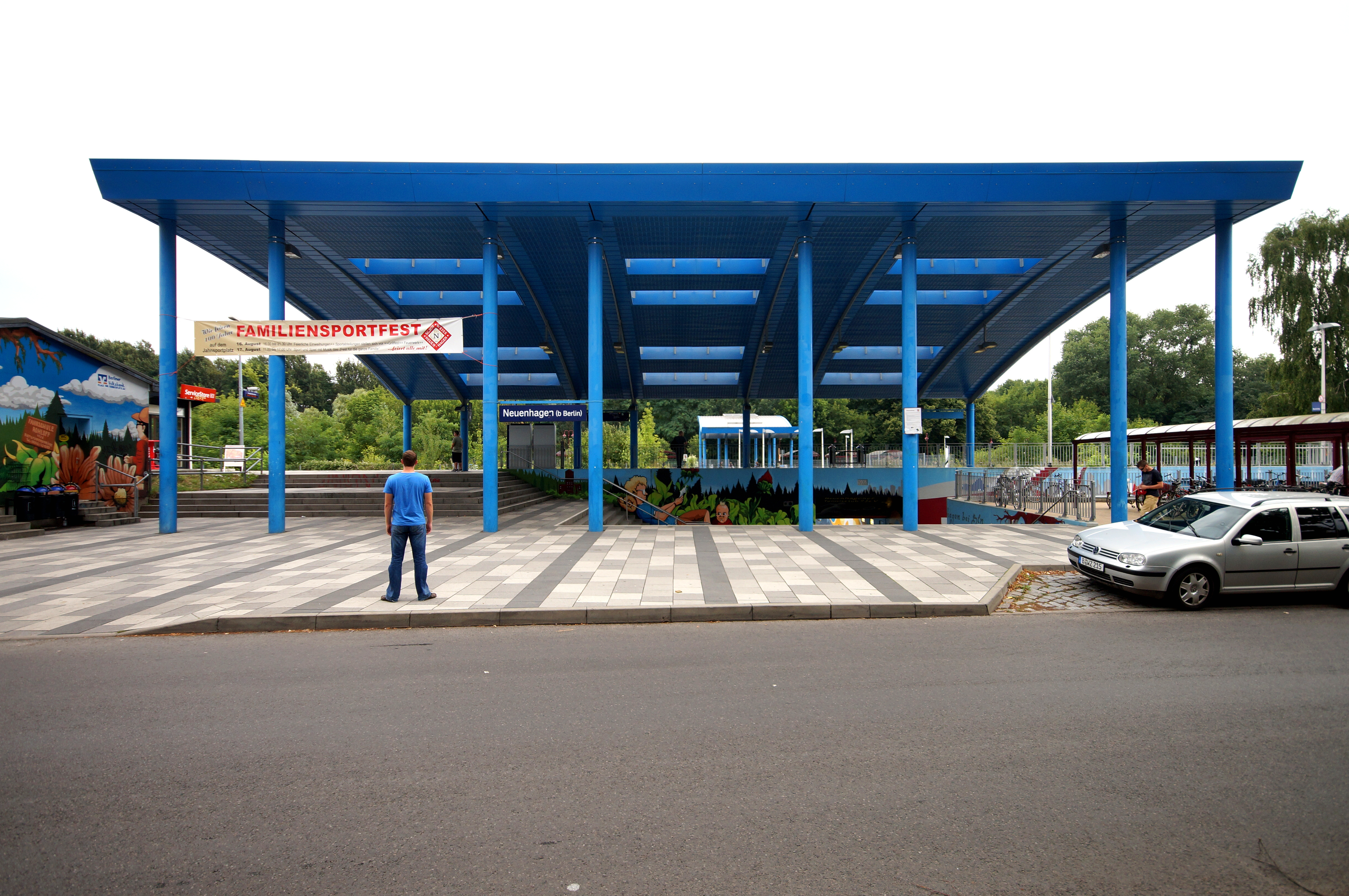

General information
- Location: Neuenhagen bei Berlin, Brandenburg; Germany
- Owner: DB Netz
- Operator: DB Station&Service
- Line: Prussian Eastern Railway
- Platforms: 1
- Tracks: 1
- Train operators: S-Bahn Berlin
- Connections: 940 949

Other information
- Station code: n/a
- Category: 6
- Fare zone: VBB: Berlin C/5460

History
- Opened: 1 October 1867

Services
Preceding station	Berlin S-Bahn	Following station
Hoppegarten (Mark) towards Westkreuz	S5	Fredersdorf towards Strausberg Nord
Location

Neuenhagen is a railway station located in Neuenhagen bei Berlin, in the Märkisch-Oderland district of Brandenburg. It is served by the S-Bahn line S5.
