= Birkenstein station =

Railway station in Hoppegarten, Germany

Coordinates: 52.5157°N 13.6475°E

Birkenstein
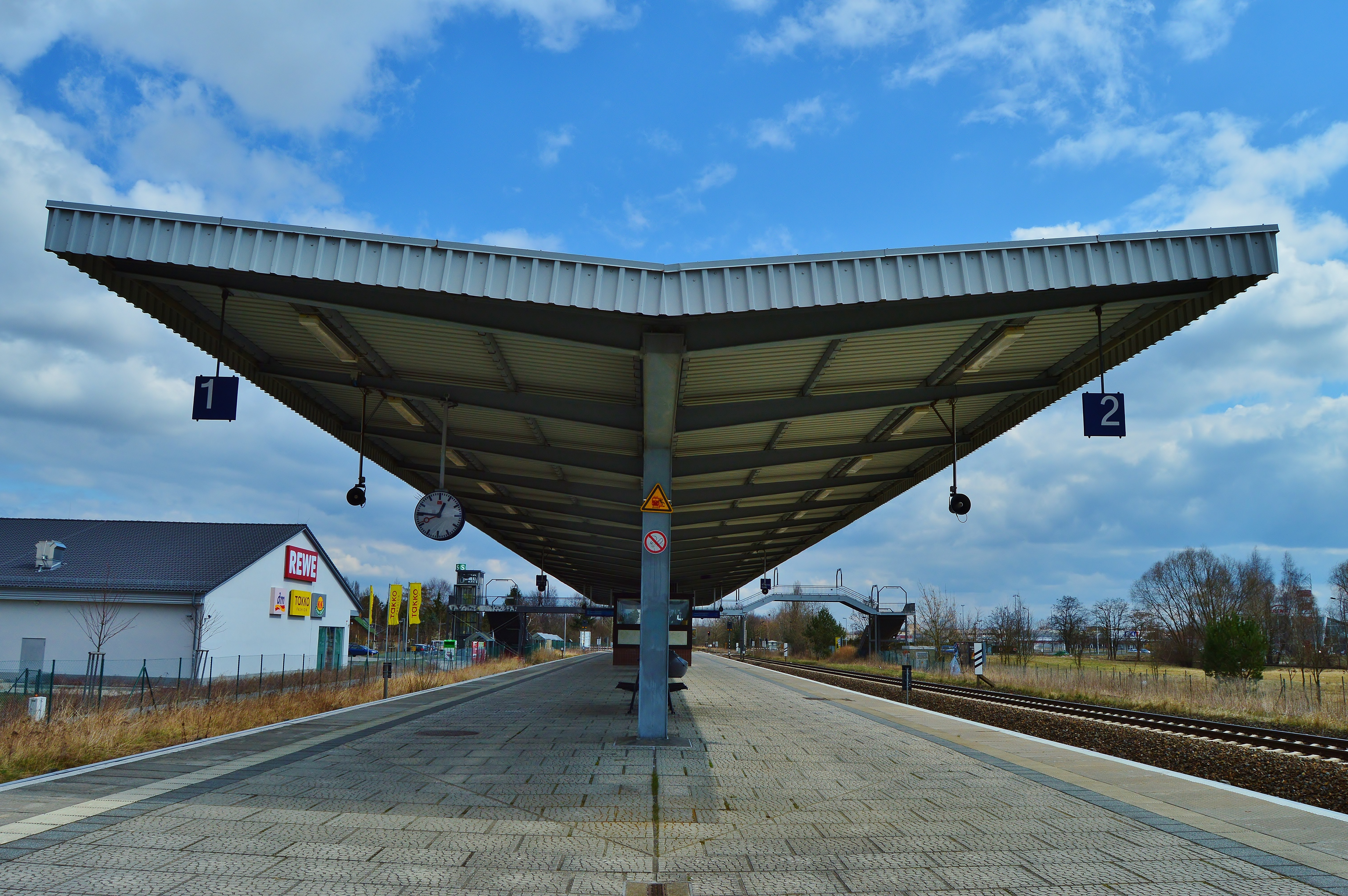
- 2015

General information
- Location: Hönower Weg; 15366 Hoppegarten; Brandenburg; Germany
- Owner: DB Netz
- Operator: DB Station&Service
- Line: Prussian Eastern Railway
- Platforms: 1 island platform
- Tracks: 2
- Train operators: S-Bahn Berlin
- Connections: 941

Other information
- Station code: 660
- DS100 code: BBIS
- IBNR: 8070002
- Category: 4
- Fare zone: VBB: Berlin C/5460
- Website: www.bahnhof.de

History
- Opened: 21 December 1992; 33 years ago

Services
Preceding station	Berlin S-Bahn	Following station
Mahlsdorf towards Westkreuz	S5	Hoppegarten (Mark) towards Strausberg Nord
Location

Birkenstein is a railway station located in Birkenstein (a civil parish of Hoppegarten), in the Märkisch-Oderland district of Brandenburg. It is served by the S-Bahn line S5.
