= Karolis Babkauskas =

Lithuanian basketball player (born 1991)

Personal information
- Born: 18 March 1991 (age 35) Kaišiadorys, Lithuania
- Listed height: 6 ft 1 in (1.85 m)
- Listed weight: 155 lb (70 kg)

Career information
- NBA draft: 2013: undrafted
- Playing career: 2010–2024
- Position: Point guard / shooting guard

Career history
- 2010–2013: BC Lietkabelis
- 2013–2014: LSU-Atletas
- 2014–2015: BC Šiauliai
- 2015–2016: Dinamo București
- 2016–2017: BC Pieno Žvaigždės
- 2017: BC Vytis
- 2018-2019: RSV Eintracht Stahnsdorf
- 2019–2020: BC Tauragė
- 2020-2021: TKS 49ers
- 2021-2023: KK Atletas
- 2023: CSA Steaua București
- 2023-2024: BC Šilutė

Career highlights
- Lithuanian League assists leader (2014)

Karolis Babkauskas (born 18 March 1991) is a Lithuanian former professional basketball player. He participated in the 2012 LKL Three–point Shootout, finishing in fourth place.

== Early life ==
When he was 17, Babkauskas played for Zalgiris Kaunas' junior team. In the group stage of the Nike International Junior Tournament qualifiers, he scored 16 points in a win over the Stella Azzura. They finished fourth in that tournament, losing to Virtus Bologna in the battle for third place. He also played for them in the 2008–09 season of the National Basketball League (NKL). They were one of the teams at the bottom of the standings that season. The following season, they just missed out on the top 12.
