= Kleinmachnow =

- Municipality
- Coat of arms

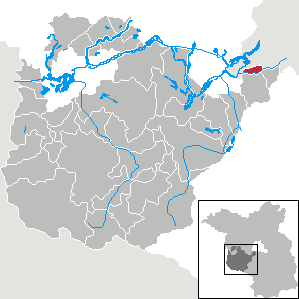
- Location of Kleinmachnow within Potsdam-Mittelmark district
- Interactive map of Kleinmachnow
- Location within Germany Location within Brandenburg
- Coordinates: 52°24′13″N 13°13′13″E
- Country: Germany
- State: Brandenburg
- District: Potsdam-Mittelmark
- Subdivisions: 2 Ortsteile

Government
  - Mayor (2025–30): Bodo Krause (CDU)

Area
  - Total: 11.91 km^{2} (4.60 sq mi)
- Elevation: 42 m (138 ft)

Population (2025-12-31)
  - Total: 19,174
  - Density: 1,610/km^{2} (4,170/sq mi)
- Time zone: UTC+01:00 (CET)
  - Summer (DST): UTC+02:00 (CEST)
- Postal codes: 14532
- Dialling codes: 033203
- Vehicle registration: PM
- Website: www.kleinmachnow.de

Kleinmachnow (German pronunciation: [klaɪnˈmaxno]) is a municipality in the Potsdam-Mittelmark district, in Brandenburg, Germany. It is situated south-west of the borough of Steglitz-Zehlendorf and east of Potsdam.

First mentioned in the Landbuch of Karl IV in 1375, the Kleinmachnow played an important role at the Bäke beek / creek crossing, secured by multiple medieval castles. The last of these castles (none of which are preserved today) belonged to the Knights of Hake, a family who shaped the local history until the 20th century. The replacement of the Bäke (beek / creek) with the Teltow Canal in 1906 brought the village the now listed historic Kleinmachnow flood-gate.

In the first half of the 20th century, Kleinmachnow grew from a rural village to a suburban municipality of the Berlin metropolitan area. The construction of the Berlin Wall cut Kleinmachnow off from West Berlin. The community's location near the border meant it was relatively isolated in the GDR. Since the German reunification, Kleinmachnow has been part of the growth of the countryside areas outside of Berlin.

== Geography ==
Kleinmachnow is bordered by the Teltow Canal in the south and by the city boundary of Berlin in the north, west and east, forming a kind of indentation in the district of Steglitz-Zehlendorf, which is a neighbouring borough. The municipality encompasses the settlement of Dreilinden.

During the Cold War period, the area could only be accessed from Teltow and Stahnsdorf via three bridges across the Teltow Canal, and access from Berlin-Zehlendorf was once again granted after 1990. Since 1996, Kleinmachnow has a separate motorway connection to the German federal motorway 115 in the west. The centre of Berlin is situated 19 km (12 mi) north-east of the town, and Potsdam 12 km (7.5 mi) east of the town.

== Geology ==
Located in the southwestern part of Berlin and adjacent Brandenburg, Kleinmachnow sits on the Teltow Ground Moraine Plateau, carved into a turbulent relief of small-scale chains of hills formed from boulder clay and meltwater channels, interspersed with puddles and pools. Geologically, the youngest Vistula Ice Age, about 21,000 years ago, created a loose erosion in the Bäke Valley that made the construction of the Teltow Canal between the Seeberg and Weinberg possible. The Seeberg area, at 65 meters above sea level, is the highest elevation in the region.

The Buschgraben is a glacial meltwater channel, located on the southwest border of Berlin, stretching in a north–south direction between the localities of Berlin-Zehlendorf and Kleinmachnow, ending at the Teltowkanal northwest of Teltow. The region of Kleinmachnow contains several small bodies of water, formed from dead ice holes. The Meiereipfuhl in the Bannwald formerly held five ponds, this has since reduced with the Duellpfuhl an der Ginsterheide, Pferdepfuhl, and Pfuhl am Jägerstieg/Ecke Wolfswerder serving as receptacles for roadway surface water today.

== History ==
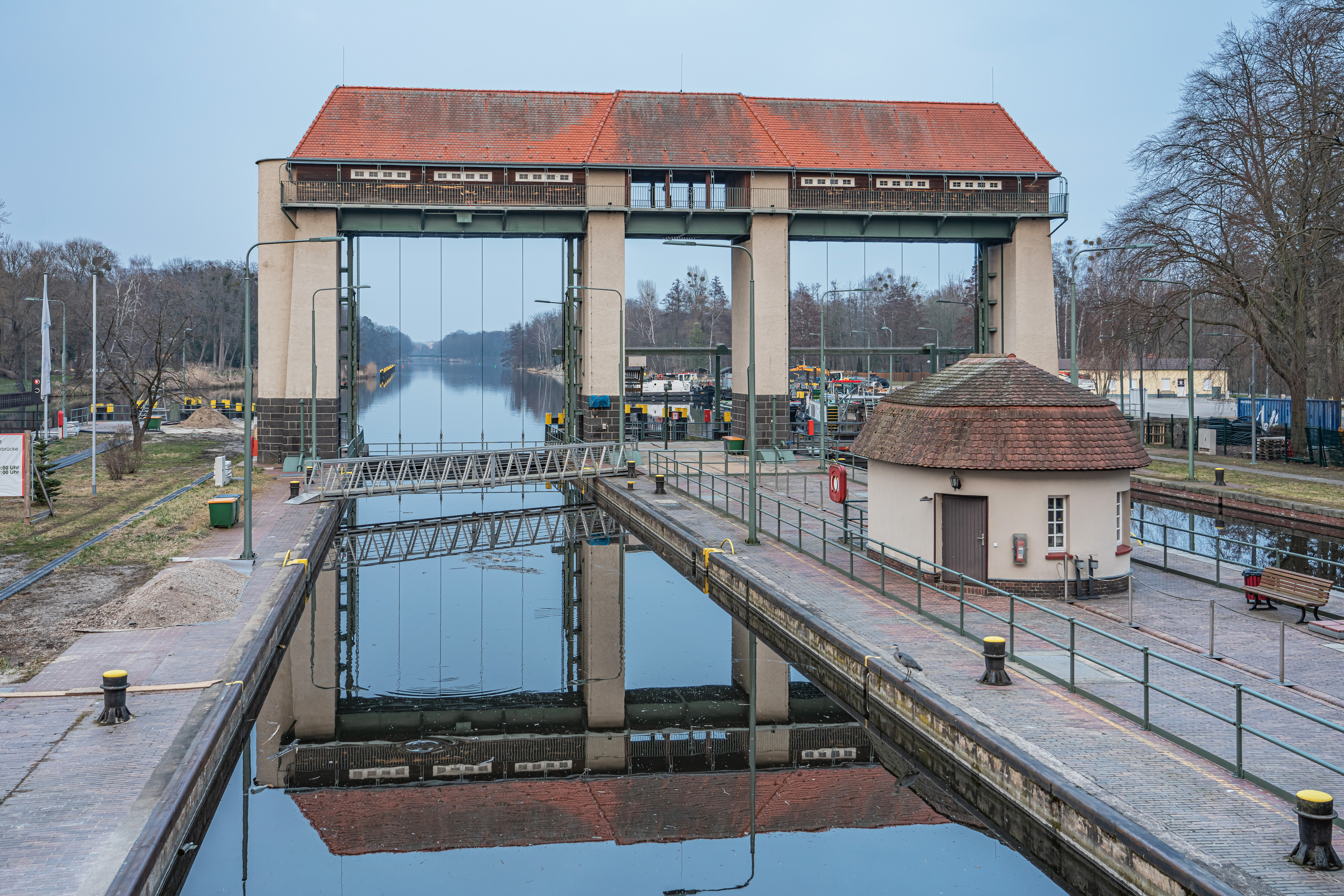
Canal lock

Kleinmachnow arose at the former Bäke creek, today replaced by the Teltow Canal built in 1906. Parvo Machenow was first mentioned in the 1375 land registry (Landbuch) of Emperor Charles IV, then also Brandenburg Elector. In medieval times the ford was controlled by a castle, recently held by the Hake noble family. Together with the canal the Kleinmachnow lock was erected, soon becoming a landmark.

From the early 20th century, the former village developed to an affluent suburb of Berlin. In 1937 Wilhelm Ohnesorge, minister of the Reichspost, acquired the Hakeburg mansion as his residence and established a large research facility of communications-electronics here. In World War II Kleinmachnow was the site of a labour camp with about 5,000 inmates, including a subcamp of Sachsenhausen.

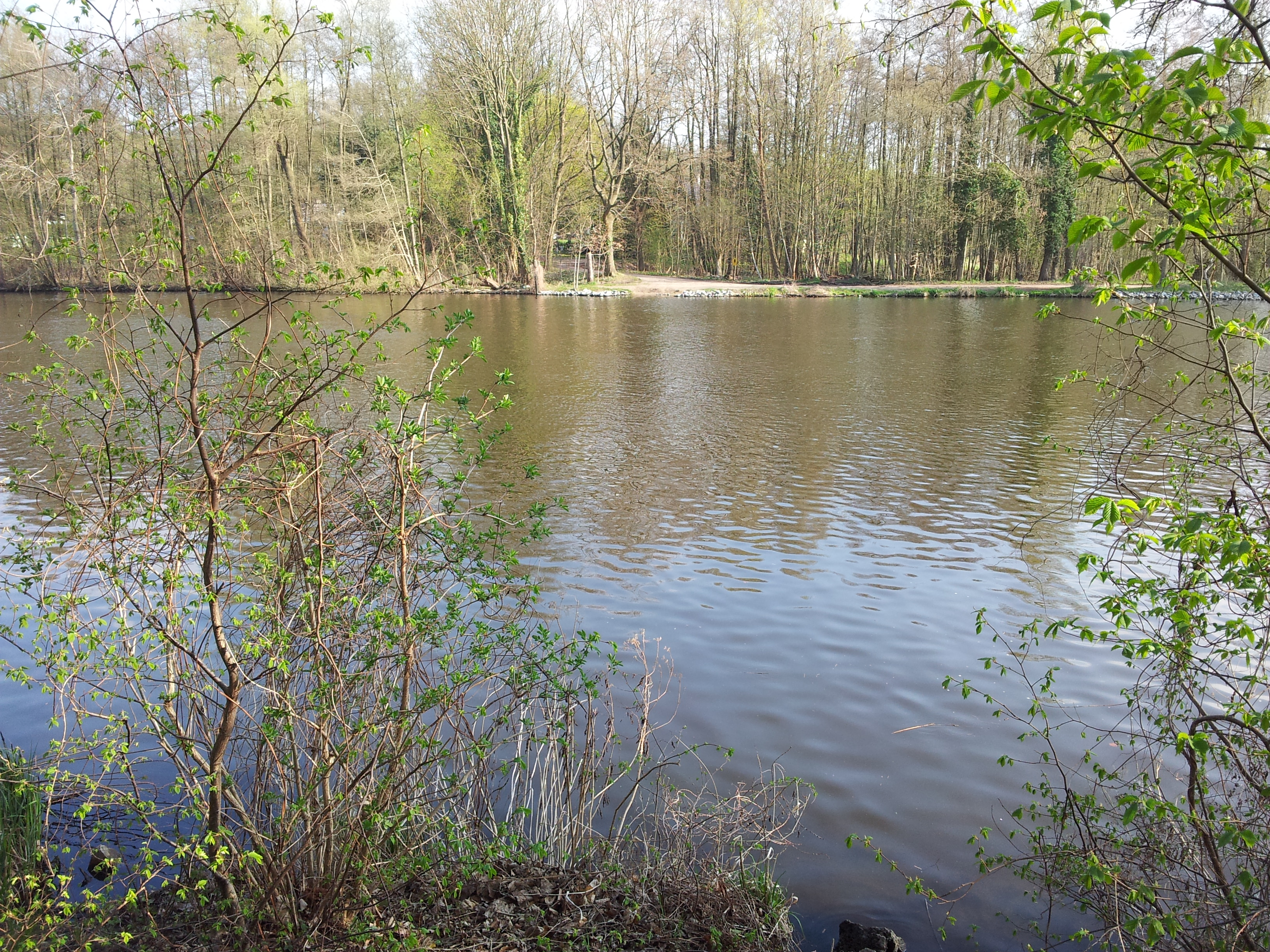
Crash site of LM316 in Kleinmachnow south of Berlin.

On the night of 2–3 December 1943, a Lancaster plane of the Royal Australian Air Force (flight LM 316) was shot down over Kleinmachnow, one of those killed being the well-known Norwegian writer and poet Nordahl Grieg, at the time serving as a war correspondent. (A memorial stone was unveiled at the site (52°23′51″N 13°12′58″E) in November 2003.)

In 1946, the Socialist Unity Party of Germany (SED) seized the Hakeburg, which hosted the party's academy in the following years. From 1961 to 1989 the municipality was girded by the Berlin Wall on three sides and the motorway near Dreilinden (today Bundesautobahn 115) was the site of a major border crossing, counterpart of the Allied Checkpoint Bravo in West Berlin. Since German reunification Kleinmachnow has seen a major increase of population, while the restitution of numerous plots in favour of those owners who had fled from the GDR led to fierce conflicts.

== Demography ==
Before the First World War, Kleinmachnow, located at the outskirts of Berlin, maintained a hamlet-like atmosphere, with a population of less than 450. This figure drastically increased in the following years due to the development of Dreilinden and the northwest expansion of the Bürgerhaus housing estate by Adolf Sommerfeld. During the 15 years between 1926 and 1939, the inhabitants of Kleinmachnow grew from 944 to 12,565.

A considerable number of citizens migrated to the West until 1961. This was compensated for by an influx of new citizens and, following the reunification of Germany, the population remained relatively constant until 1995. Subsequently, due to the increase of restitution claims by the original property owners, as well as the allure of the area, the number of inhabitants doubled from the mid-1990s until today.

Development of population since 1875 within the current Boundaries (Blue Line: Population; Dotted Line: Comparison to Population development in Brandenburg state; Grey Background: Time of Nazi Germany; Red Background: Time of communist East Germany)

Recent Population Development and Projections (Population Development before Census 2011 (blue line); Recent Population Development according to the Census in Germany in 2011 (blue bordered line); Official projections for 2005-2030 (yellow line); for 2017-2030 (scarlet line); for 2020-2030 (green line)

Kleinmachnow: Population development
within the current boundaries (2020)

Year	Pop.	±% p.a.
1875	176	—
1890	181	+0.19%
1910	401	+4.06%
1925	840	+5.05%
1939	12,565	+21.32%
1950	13,743	+0.82%
1964	13,817	+0.04%

Year	Pop.	±% p.a.
1971	14,304	+0.50%
1981	13,159	−0.83%
1985	12,435	−1.40%
1990	11,613	−1.36%
1995	11,283	−0.57%
2000	15,796	+6.96%
2005	18,367	+3.06%

Year	Pop.	±% p.a.
2010	19,890	+1.61%
2015	20,655	+0.76%
2016	20,644	−0.05%
2017	20,608	−0.17%
2018	20,564	−0.21%
2019	20,376	−0.91%
2020	20,406	+0.15%

== Religion ==
In 1539, Joachim II, the Elector of Brandenburg, initiated the Reformation, resulting in the conversion of Bradenburg from a primarily Catholic region to a mainly Protestant area. Initially, Lutheranism was the major denomination of the region, but was eventually joined by the Reformed Church.

The old village church was first constructed in 1597 as one of the earliest Protestant-style church buildings in the region. The building belonged to the landed property the von Hake family, who were recorded to have renounced their Catholicism prior to the Elector of Brandenburg. Subsequent to the expansion of the local area in the 1920s and 1930s, a parish hall was erected near the Jägersteig, which was upgraded to a church in 1953 and named the Evangelical Church of the Resurrection. As of August 2012 the church had 5,400 adherents.

In addition to the regional church congregation, an Evangelical Lutheran Free Church was based in Brandenburg from its inception in 1871. Following 1922, the congregation held services in the former sailors' convalescent home located on Zehlendorfer Damm. In May 2007, the congregation of approximately 70 attendees was officially named the Paul Gerhardt Congregation of the Evangelical Lutheran Free Church. The property was later sold to the rapper Bushido, and regular services were relocated to Teltow.

== Politics ==
Seats in the municipal assembly (Gemeindevertretung) as of 2019 elections
Party	Seats	%
Christian Democratic Union	5	19.1
Social Democratic Party of Germany	5	19.0
The Left	3	8.8
Alliance 90/The Greens	7	24.6
Alternative for Germany	2	5.8
Free Democratic Party	2	7.2
PRO (independent)	1	3.3

=== Mayors ===
- 1920 to 1933 Heinrich Funke served as the mayor of the municipality
- 1935 to 1945 Erich Engelbrecht of the National Socialist German Workers' Party (NSDAP)
- 1945 to 1946 Ernst Lemmer of the Christian Democratic Union (CDU)
- 1948 to 1950 Friedrich Gellert of the Socialist Unity Party (SED)
- 1952 to 1960 Walter Schuch (SED)
- 1961 to 1962 Antonie Stemmler (SED)
- 1990 to 1994 Klaus Nitzsche of the Social Democratic Party (SPD)
- 1994 to 2009 Wolfgang Blasig (SPD). Blasig retained the position of mayor until his resignation in 2009 in order to serve as administrator for the Potsdam-Mittelmark district.
- Since 2009, Michael Grubert of the SPD has held the position, having won a successive eight-year term on November 27, 2016, with 57.8% of the valid votes

=== Collaboration with neighbouring communities ===
In 1967, during the German Democratic Republic, the possibility of a merger of Kleinmachnow, Stahnsdorf and Teltow districts was first considered. In 1972, the three districts established an administrative and organizational alliance, nonetheless maintaining their individual legal status. Since the reunification of Germany in 1990, debate has persisted over the most effective administrative arrangement; ranging from merely informal cooperation, through contractual collaboration, to full amalgamation into a single large district. Despite the district area restructuring that occurred in Brandenburg from 2000 to 2003, Kleinmachnow remains and was unaffected.

The 2009 Berlin-Bradenburg State Development Plan led to a re-examination of the two-tier system of central places for Bradenburg, involving the establishment of "a framework for spatial development in the capital region of Berlin-Bradenburg". The plan proposed four regional centres and fifty medium-sized centres. Teltow was noted as the sole medium centre for the region, which would result to reduced financial support for the Stahnsdorf and Kleinmachnow districts. The political dispute concerning this proposed change remains unconcluded.

== Sports ==
In 2001 and 2007, Eigenherd European School in Kleinmachnow was awarded for its sporting excellence by the Ministry of Education, Youth and Sport in Bradenburg.

In 2021, the district of Teltow joined forces with Kleinmachnow to create a four-day program for an international contingent of athletes participating in the Special Olympics World Summer Games 2023, Berlin. As a result of their successful application, in 2022 Kleinmachnow was chosen to be the host town for Special Olympics Samoa. This endeavour marked the largest district inclusion project to have taken place in Germany with over 200 towns participating in the endeavour.

Kleinmachnow is one of the three home towns of the basketball team TKS 49ers.

== Twinned towns ==
- Schopfheim, Germany (since 1996)
- Battambang, Cambodia
- Klatovy, Czech Republic

== Notable people ==
- Lily Braun, feminist, born 2 July 1865 in Halberstadt, died 8 August 1916 in Berlin, lived in Kleinmachnow from 1909
- Friedrich Kayßler, actor, born 7 April 1874 in Neurode (Nowa Ruda), died 24 April 1945 in Kleinmachnow
- Arnold Schoenberg, composer, born 13 September 1874 in Vienna, died 13 July 1951 in Los Angeles, lived in Kleinmachnow from 1911 to 1913
- Kurt Weill, composer, born 2 March 1900 in Dessau; died 3 April 1950 in New York City, lived in Kleinmachnow from 1932 to 1933
- Hanns Maaßen, writer, born 26 December 1908 in Lübeck, died 23 June 1983 in Mahlow, lived in Kleinmachnow from 1971
- Margarete Sommer, humanitarian, born 21 July 1893, died 30 June 1965, lived in Kleinmachnow from 1934 to 1950
- Fred Wander, writer, born 5 January 1917 in Vienna, died 10 July 2006 in Vienna, lived in Kleinmachnow from 1958 to 1983
- Karl Gass, documentary filmmaker, born 2 February 1917 in Mannheim, died 29 January 2009 in Kleinmachnow, lived in Kleinmachnow from 1961 to 2009
- Christa Wolf, writer, born 18 March 1929 in Landsberg an der Warthe (Gorzów Wielkopolski), died 1 December 2011 in Berlin, lived in Kleinmachnow from 1962 to 1976
