= Neuenhagen bei Berlin =

- Municipality
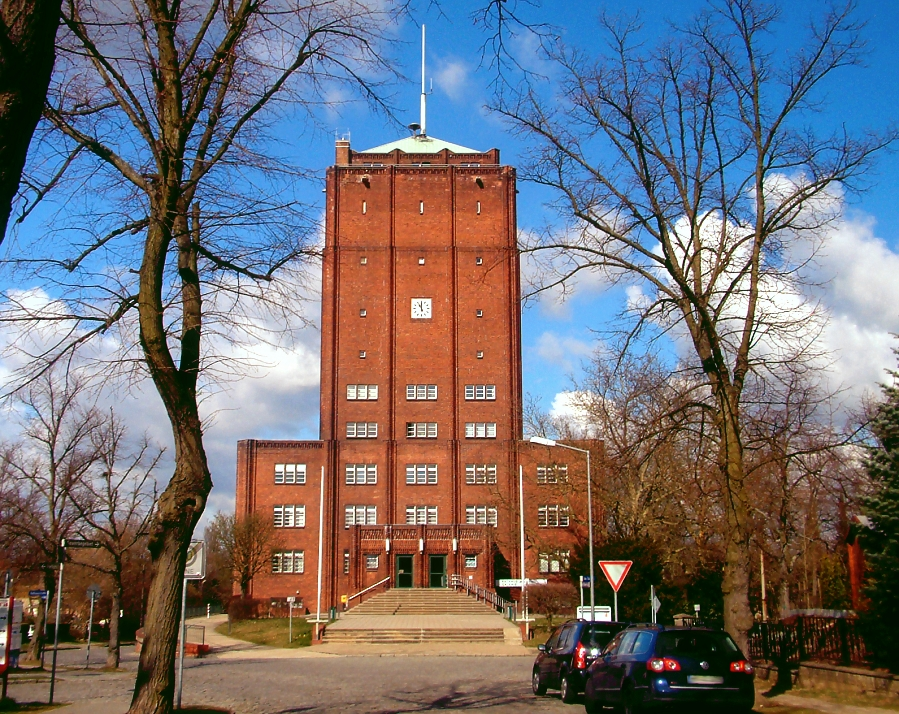
- Town hall

- Coat of arms

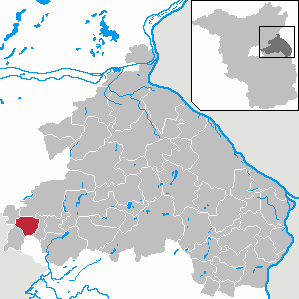
- Location of Neuenhagen bei Berlin within Märkisch-Oderland district
- Interactive map of Neuenhagen bei Berlin
- Location within Germany Location within Brandenburg
- Coordinates: 52°32′N 13°41′E
- Country: Germany
- State: Brandenburg
- District: Märkisch-Oderland
- Subdivisions: 3 Ortsteile

Government
  - Mayor (2018–26): Ansgar Scharnke (Ind.)

Area
  - Total: 19.61 km^{2} (7.57 sq mi)
- Elevation: 58 m (190 ft)

Population (2025-12-31)
  - Total: 19,295
  - Density: 983.9/km^{2} (2,548/sq mi)
- Time zone: UTC+01:00 (CET)
  - Summer (DST): UTC+02:00 (CEST)
- Postal codes: 15366
- Dialling codes: 03342
- Vehicle registration: MOL
- Website: www.neuenhagen-bei-berlin.de

Neuenhagen bei Berlin (German pronunciation: [nɔʏənˈhaːɡn̩ baɪ bɛʁˈliːn], lit. 'Neuenhagen near Berlin') is a municipality in the district Märkisch-Oderland of Brandenburg, Germany. It is situated 19 km east of central Berlin, and was founded around 1230.

== History ==
Neuenhagen was founded around 1230.

== Geography ==
Neuenhagen is located east of Berlin, in eastern Germany.

== Demography ==
Development of Population since 1875 within the Current Boundaries (Blue Line: Population; Dotted Line: Comparison to Population Development of Brandenburg state; Grey Background: Time of Nazi rule; Red Background: Time of Communist rule)

Recent Population Development and Projections (Population Development before Census 2011 (blue line); Recent Population Development according to the Census in Germany in 2011 (blue bordered line); Official projections for 2005-2030 (yellow line); for 2017-2030 (scarlet line); for 2020-2030 (green line)

Neuenhagen bei Berlin: Population development
within the current boundaries (2020)

Year	Pop.	±% p.a.
1875	874	—
1890	1,129	+1.72%
1910	2,792	+4.63%
1925	5,732	+4.91%
1939	11,997	+5.42%
1950	12,300	+0.23%
1964	13,008	+0.40%

Year	Pop.	±% p.a.
1971	13,010	+0.00%
1981	12,238	−0.61%
1985	11,950	−0.59%
1990	11,265	−1.17%
1995	11,802	+0.94%
2000	14,917	+4.80%
2005	16,325	+1.82%

Year	Pop.	±% p.a.
2010	16,911	+0.71%
2015	17,593	+0.79%
2016	17,883	+1.65%
2017	17,986	+0.58%
2018	18,301	+1.75%
2019	18,657	+1.95%
2020	18,832	+0.94%

== Mayor ==
The mayor Jürgen Henze was elected in 2002 with 59.4% of the vote, then reelected in 2010 with 75.2% of the vote. In 2019, he was replaced by Ansgar Scharnke.

== Transport ==
The town is well connected to Berlin by the S-Bahn line S5 at the station of Neuenhagen.

== Partnerships ==
=== Twin towns ===
- Świebodzin, Poland
- Grünwald, Germany
- Friesoythe, Germany

== Notable figures from the town ==
- Hanna Solf (1887-1954), member of the German resistance to Nazism
- Wolfgang Rademann (1934-2016), journalist and TV producer

== People associated with the town ==
- Hans Fallada (1893-1947), author, lived from August 1930 to November 1932 in a house in the settlement of Grüner Winkel in Neuenhagen. Between October 1931 and February 1932 he worked on his novel Little Man, What Now? (novel) there. On the occasion of its 70th anniversary in 1963, Grüner Winkel was renamed Falladaring. A panel at his dwelling house in Falladaring 10 pays tribute to the writer. In his honor, the Hans-Fallada-Grundschule in Neuenhagen was named after him.
