= List of Berlin Wall segments =

Segments of the Berlin Wall have been given to various institutions since the fall of the wall on November 9, 1989. Segments are occasionally moved, so locations shown may not be accurate.

== Africa ==
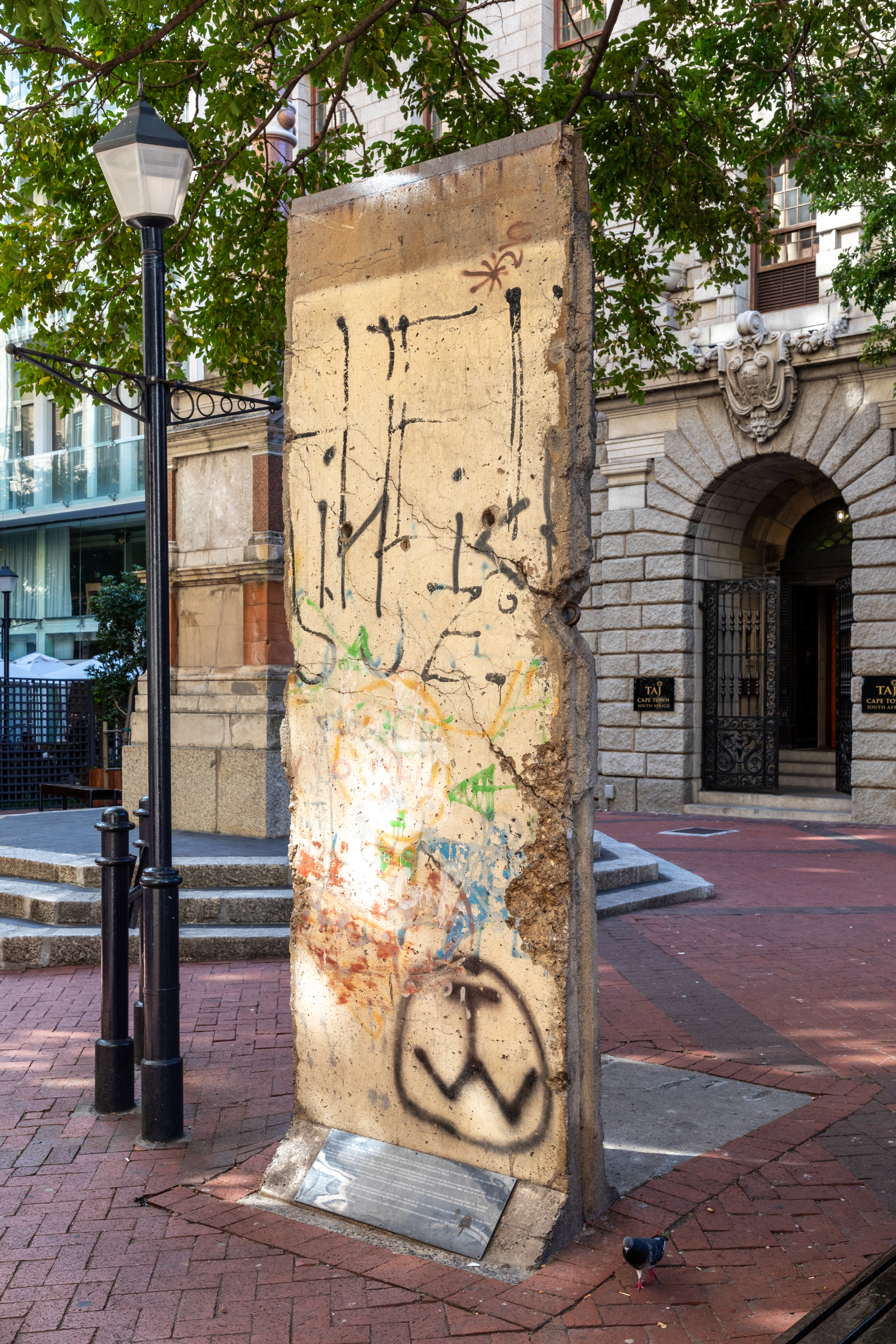
Berlin Wall in St George’s Mall, Cape Town, Western Cape, South Africa

=== South Africa ===
- Cape Town – a piece of the Berlin Wall is displayed in St George's Mall. The piece of the wall was given to Nelson Mandela after a state visit to Berlin.

== Asia ==
=== Bangladesh ===
- Dhaka – a segment of the wall was temporarily put on display 23 May 2010 in the Bengal Gallery of Fine Arts in the Dhanmondi district of the city.

=== Indonesia ===
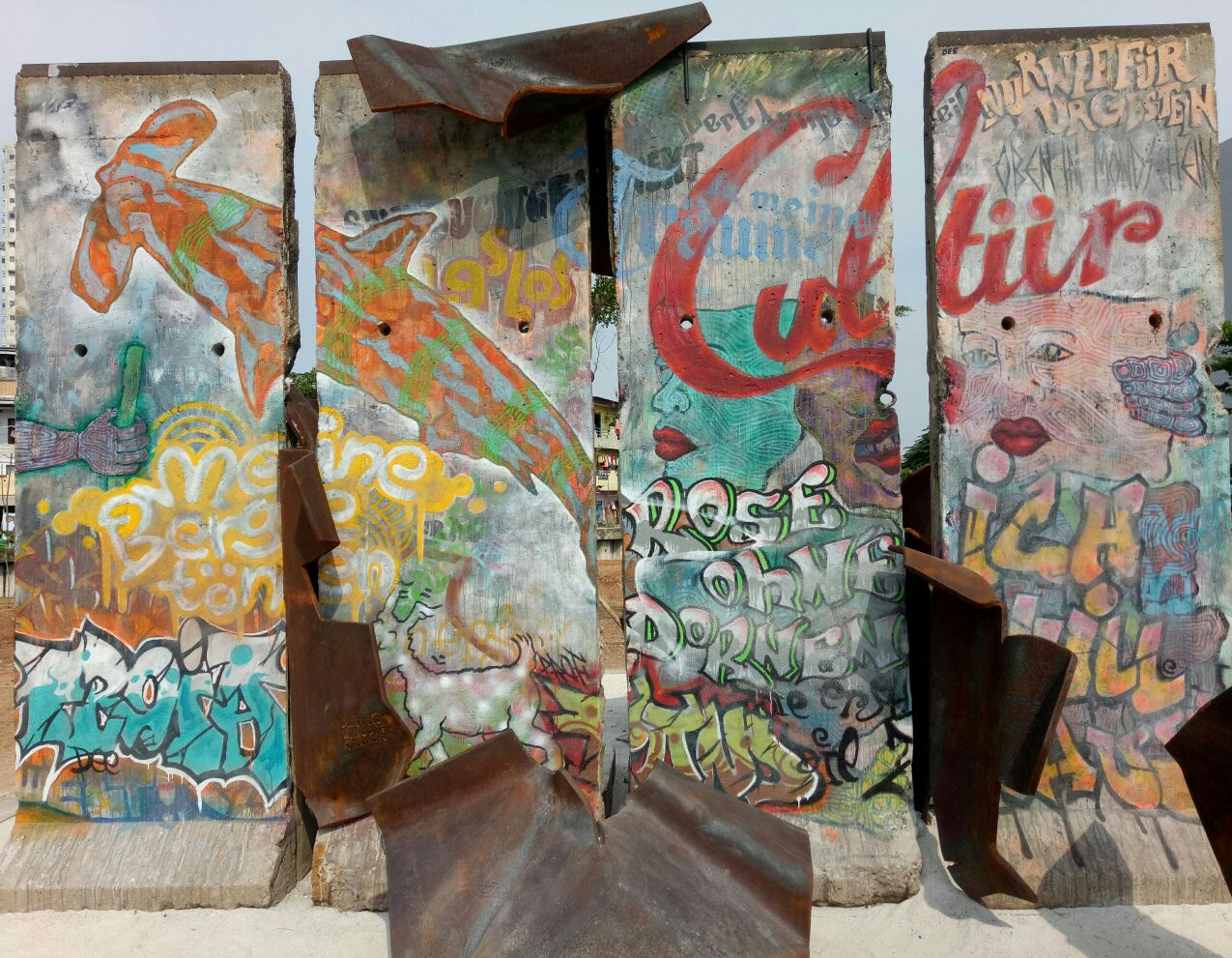
Four sections of the Berlin Wall in the Kalijodo Park, Jakarta.

- Jakarta – four sections of the wall were installed on 3 October 2017 in Kalijodo Park, during a commemoration of German Unity Day.

=== Israel ===
- Ein Hod – at the Dada Museum in the center of the artist's village.

=== Japan ===
- Yokohama – a small segment at German School of Tokyo Yokohama. It was previously owned by Japanese clothing retail group Aoki Holdings and donated for the school on May 18, 2016. A second segment with graffiti by a French artist Thierry Noir at the front yard of the Global Technology Assessment Center of TÜV Rheinland Japan Ltd.
- Osaka – two segments are displayed at the Toukokuji Temple.
- Tokyo – a segment stands in the lobby of Nihon Bisoh Co., Ltd.
- Okinawa – two segments in the Kinderhaus of Ueno German Culture Village in Okinawa.

=== Philippines ===
- Manila – on 8 October 2015, a segment of the wall was installed at National Museum of the Philippines. The segment was a gift to the Philippines from the City of Berlin, but had remained unclaimed in Berlin for a decade before its installation which coincided with the 25th anniversary of German reunification. It was also intended as a celebration of influence of the 1986 Filipino People Power Revolution on the German unification movement. On 5 October 2020, the wall was transferred and displayed at the Kartilya ng Katipunan Monument.

=== Singapore ===
- National University of Singapore – in October 2016, two panels of the Berlin Wall were unveiled on the university campus. The panels were gifted to Singapore's Ministry of Foreign Affairs to mark 50 years of diplomatic relations between Germany and Singapore. They were loaned to the University by the Ministry and are on display at a garden behind Tembusu College.
- A segment of the Berlin Wall was formerly on display at the Bedok Reservoir Park. It has since been removed replaced by new artwork. This segment had been painted by a local artist to depict two different types of rulers.
- A segment of the Berlin Wall is on display at the Internal Security Department Heritage Centre

=== South Korea ===
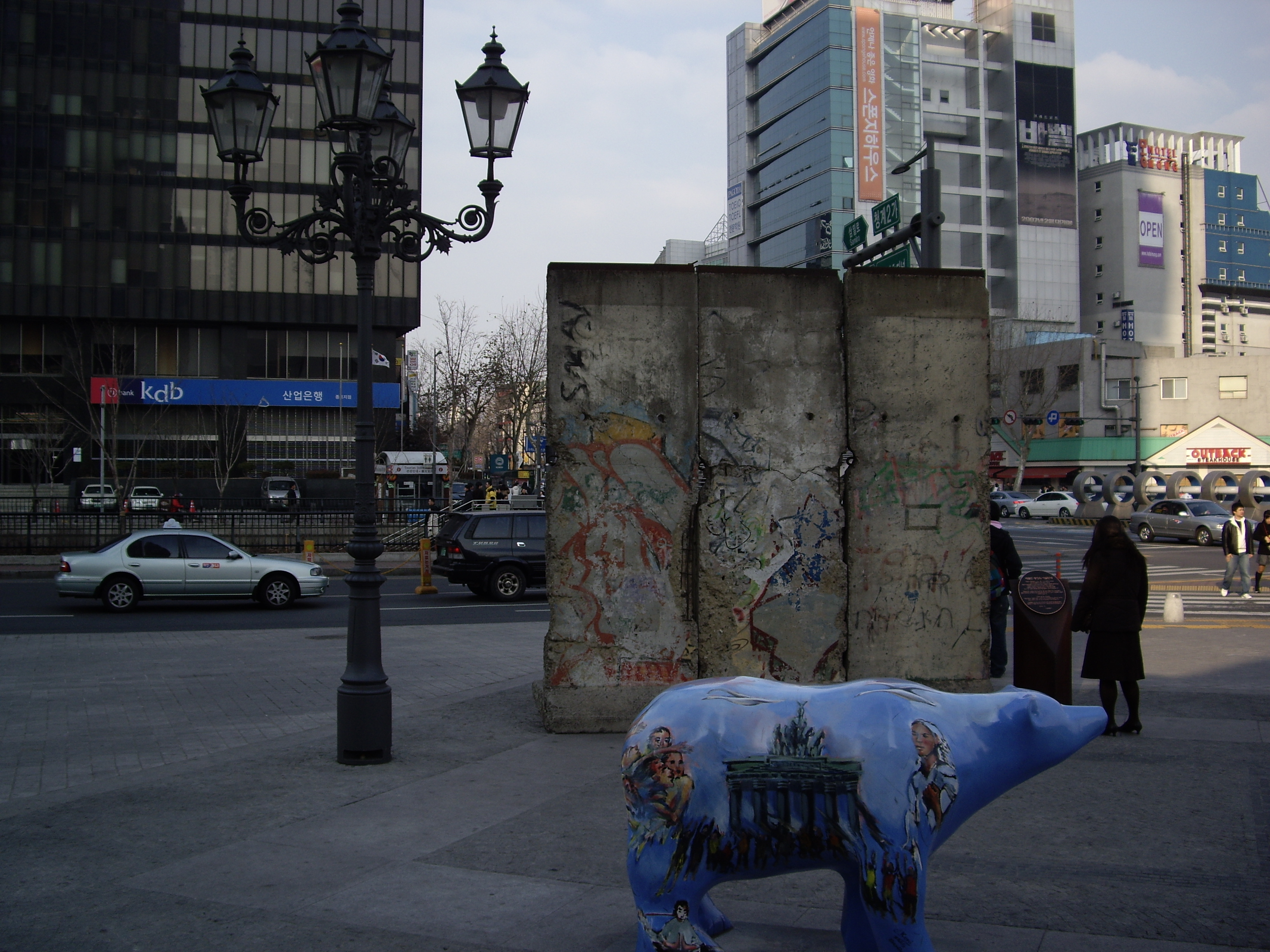
Three sections of the wall with a Berlin street light along the Cheonggyecheon stream in downtown Seoul and a bear, the heraldic animal of Berlin

- Seoul – three sections of the wall are displayed along the recently restored Cheonggyecheon (청계천) stream in central Seoul and were presented in conjunction with the restoration project. The sections are adjacent to the Samilgyo (삼일교) bridge across the stream.
- Sokcho – two sections of the Berlin Wall are on display at the DMZ Museum north of Sokcho.

=== Taiwan ===
- Taipei – a segment of the Berlin Wall was unveiled in the garden of the Taiwan Foundation for Democracy in Taipei's Da'an District (大安區) during a special ceremony to mark the 20th anniversary of the Fall of the Berlin Wall in 2009. The segment was donated to the Taiwan Foundation for Democracy by the authorities in Oberhavel, Brandenburg.

== Oceania ==
=== Australia ===
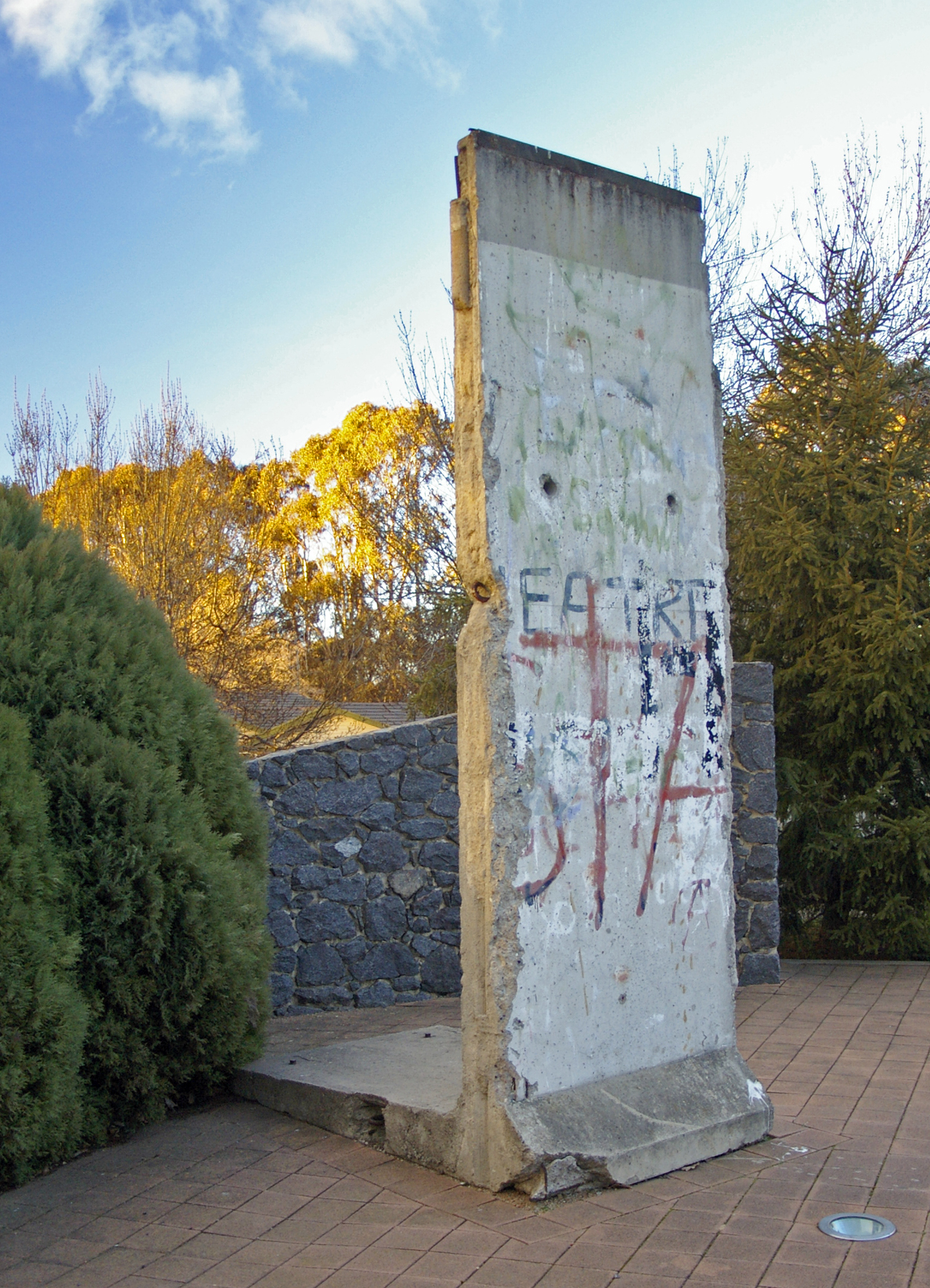
A section of the wall at the Harmonie German Club

- Canberra – a section of the Berlin Wall has been placed in front of the clubhouse of the Harmonie German Club in the suburb of Narrabundah in the Australian capital. The segment weighs 3.5 tonnes, is 3.6 metres high and nearly two metres wide. It once stood in Potsdamer Platz, close to the Brandenburg Gate. It was unveiled on 3 October 1992.
- Sydney – a section of the Berlin Wall was placed on display outside the Goethe Institute in the suburb of Woollahra in 2019. It had been imported to Australia in the early 1990s, but held in storage in a warehouse.

=== New Zealand ===
- Christchurch – two sections of the Berlin Wall were placed in Rauora Park, near Cashel Street, in the center of the city. These segments were imported in 2017, stored for some time, and then placed in the park having been decorated with street art by Kophie Su'a-Hulsbosch (Meep) and Jessie Rawcliffe.

== Europe ==
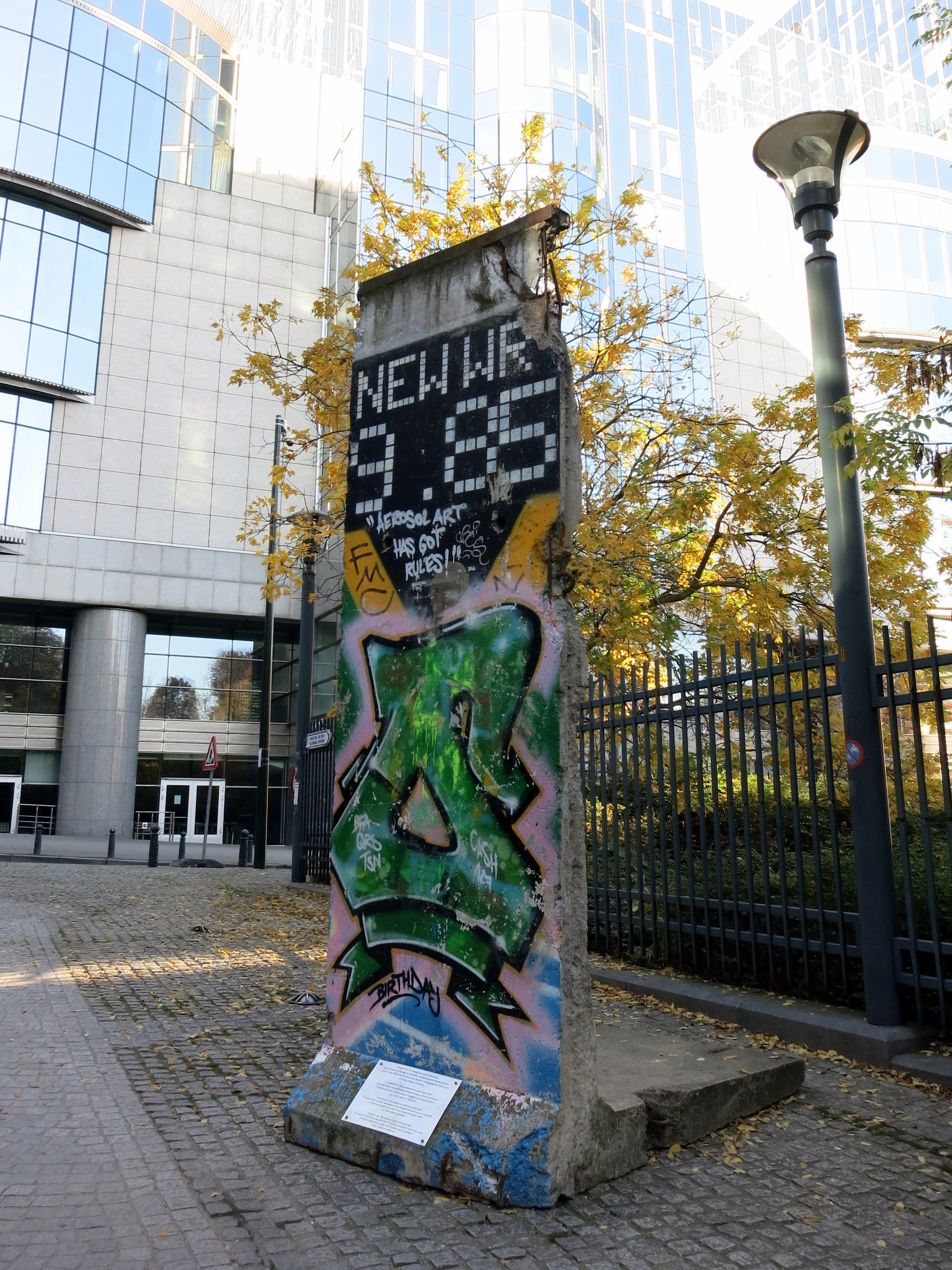
The section of the Berlin Wall outside the EU Parliament in Brussels

=== Albania ===
- Tirana – unveiled in 2013 in the Blloku district, as part of a memorial to victims of the Communist Regime.

=== Belgium ===
- Brussels – two segments of the wall are on display outside the European Commission, a segment also stands outside the European Parliament offices. A further two segments are on display in front of the NATO Headquarters building inaugurated in 2017. A segment stands in Leopold Park – moved to be next to the segment found outside the European Parliament in 2021, and at the headquarters of Elia Group in Schaerbeek. In 2009, 16 wall segments were temporarily exhibited in the Place du Luxembourg to commemorate the twentieth anniversary of the fall of the Wall.
- Ghent – a segment of wall is on display outside the Flanders Expo convention center. This segment originally stood on Potsdamer Platz. A second segment stands in the Zwevezele garden of the former Flanders Expo executive who arranged the display of the wall.
- Antwerp – in 2015, a segment was installed outside the Ampere nightclub.
- Kemmel – a segment stands outside the former NATO command bunker which is now a visitor center.
- Mons – a segment stands outside Supreme Headquarters Allied Powers Europe.

=== Bulgaria ===
- Sofia – a section is part of a memorial in the park in front of the National Palace of Culture in the city center.
- Plovdiv – a segment of the wall, painted by French artist Thierry Noir, was unveiled in front of Exhibition Hall 2019 in Bulgaria's city of Plovdiv on December 19, 2019.

=== Croatia ===
- Zagreb – a segment was unveiled in 2009 outside the German embassy in Zagreb.

=== Czech Republic ===
- Prague – in 2018, a section of the Wall was unveiled outside the newly opened A&O Hostel in Strašnice.

=== Denmark ===
- Langeland – since 2011, a segment has been on display at the Koldkrigsmuseum Langelandsfort (Cold War Museum Langelandsfort), a former Danish Navy submarine bunker. This segment was a gift from the City of Berlin and was originally located at Potsdamer Platz.

=== Estonia ===
- Tallinn – a segment of the wall was installed outside the Museum of Occupations in November 2014. The segment was a gift to Estonia from the Senate of Berlin, and originally formed part of the wall along Potsdamer Platz.

=== Finland ===
- Tampere – a segment of the wall was gifted to the city of Tampere in 2008. In 2019 it was put on display in front of a local library, accompanied by a photograph exhibition, for two weeks.

=== France ===
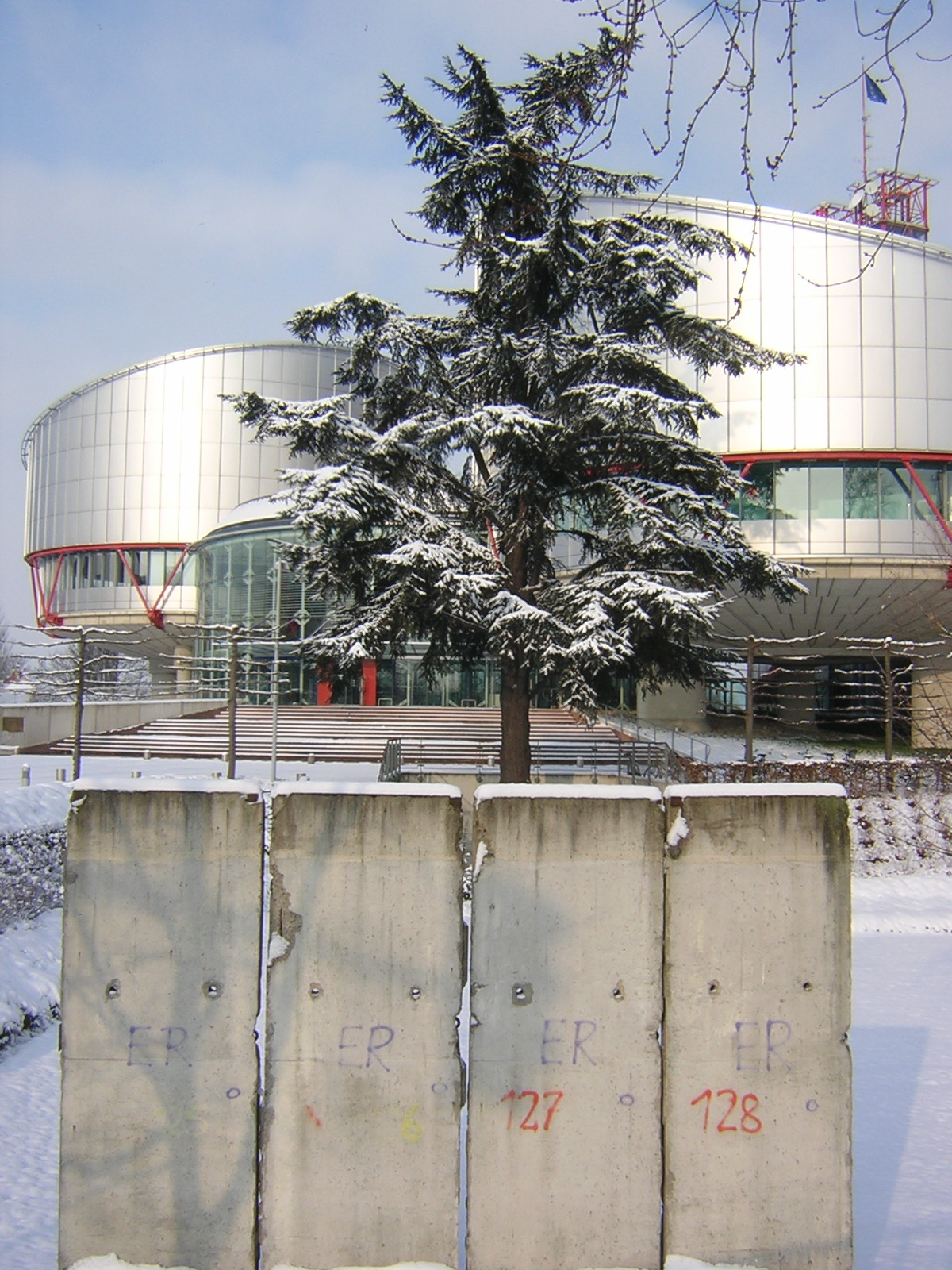
A section of the Berlin Wall outside the European Court of Human Rights in Strasbourg

- Angers – a segment of the wall is on display in front of the movie theater Pathé. Several were on display inside a contemporary theatre called Le Quai. It played a central role in the 2011 edition of the Les Accroche-coeurs festival.
- Caen – a segment of the wall is on display inside the Mémorial pour la Paix.
- Camphin-en-Pévèle – a segment of the wall, decorated with a graffiti of the footballer Eden Hazard by French artist C215, is on display inside the Domaine de Luchin, the training ground of Lille OSC, near Lille.
- Paris – a segment is displayed in La Défense. A segment is displayed outside the Porte de Versailles metro station. The segment outside the Maison de la Radio et de la Musique was a gift on the twentieth anniversary of the wall's fall in 2009, to commemorate Radio France's work broadcasting to Berlin during the Cold War.
- Miramas – a segment of the wall is on a sculpture, in front of the Lycée Jean Cocteau of Miramas.
- Saumur - a segment of the wall is on display in the Cold War room in the Musée des Blindés.
- Strasbourg – a segment of the wall is on display outside the European Court of Human Rights.
- Verdun – a segment of the wall is at the Centre Mondial de la Paix.

=== Germany ===
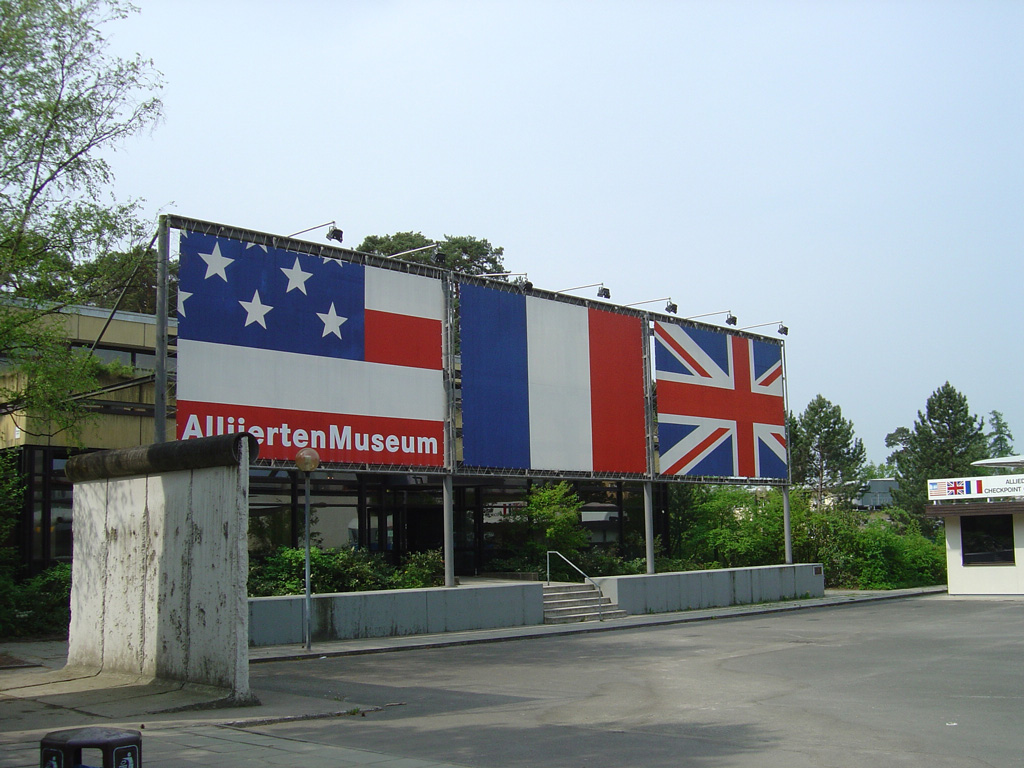
The Allied Museum in Berlin

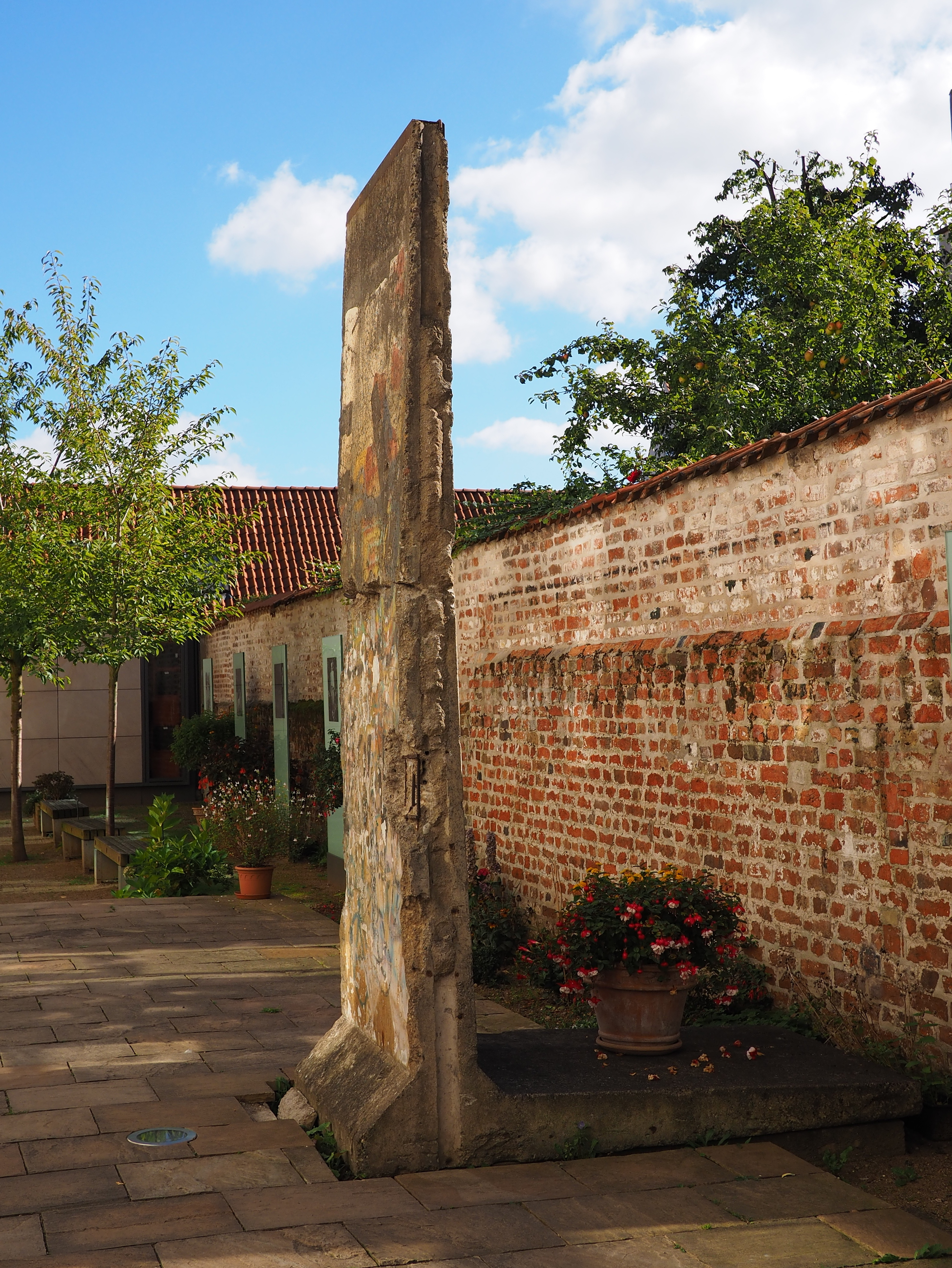
A segment of the Berlin Wall in the garden of the Willy Brandt House in Lübeck

- Berlin – a section of four segments is on display with the external exhibits of the Allied Museum along with a border guard tower and the Checkpoint Charlie guard house. On 13 February 2008, a segment of the Berlin Wall was installed in the courtyard of the U.S. Embassy Berlin on 13 February 2008, "to serve as a reminder of the past and a symbol of hope for the future". A growing collection of painted sections of the wall are on permanent display in Stralauer Allee 3. On Friedrichstrasse, a segment of the wall can be seen next to the Mauermuseum, 40m south of Checkpoint Charlie. On the 20th anniversary of the fall of the Wall in November 2009, two wall segments were set up in front the John F. Kennedy high school building. The two segments were cemented back-to-back, whereby the respective short foot extensions of the bases were cut off. The "West" side is painted with colorful graffiti whereas the "East" side is colored historical plain white.
- Bremen – a segment of the wall is situated near the Übersee Museum Bremen, in front of the Bremen Hauptbahnhof
- Diedorf – seven segments of the wall displayed near Schmutterhalle. The segments are owned by Mathias Maresch who bought them for DM 2000,- after the fall of the Berlin Wall.
- Düsseldorf - a segment of the wall is situated in the Buergerpark near the state parliament building.
- Frankfurt – a segment of the wall is on display, possibly temporarily (as of August 2019), near the Goethe House. It is outside of the Leica store at the intersection of Am Salzhaus and Großer Hirschgraben. There is also one segment of the wall on display in the Luftbrückendenkmal (Airlift Memorial) near the Frankfurt Airport.
- Hamburg – a segment of the wall is in front of the Elbphilharmonie at Platz der Deutschen Einheit, Hamburg.
- Hamm – a segment of the wall can be found at Harringholzstr. 37.
- Hanover – a segment of the wall is located on Weißekreuzplatz.
- Herford – a segment of the wall is located on Berliner Straße.
- Kiel – a segment of the wall has been installed outside of the Landeshaus, the seat of the Landtag of Schleswig-Holstein.
- Koblenz – three segments of the Berlin Wall on permanent display on the Deutsches Eck promontory, in memorial to the division of Germany.
- Lübeck – a segment of the wall is in the garden of the Willy Brandt House.
- Munich – a segment of the wall is at the south west corner of Englischer Garten, next to the U.S. Consulate General.
- Ramstein Air Base – a segment of the wall is in front of the base Passenger Terminal on base.
- Rheindahlen – until its closure in 2013, a segment of the wall was displayed at British Forces Germany's Joint Headquarters (JHQ) compound.
- Rust – two segments of the wall stand near the entrance of Europa-Park, the largest theme park in Germany.
- Speyer – there are two Berlin Wall segments on display at the Technik Museum Speyer.
- Stuttgart – a segment of the wall is displayed at Kelley Barracks in Mohringen. A second segment is displayed outside Patch Barracks in front of the headquarters of U.S. European Command.
- Weimar – two segments are installed outside the Atrium shopping Center.
- Witten – segments of the wall signed by the Thierry Noir can be found in Witten.
- Würzburg – A segment of the wall is standing in the Berliner Platz near the Würzburg central railway station.

=== Greece ===
- Thessaloniki – a segment of Berlin wall can be found in the garden of Goethe Institut. It was formerly located in a square of the citadel of Lagadas, given as a gift by city of Steglitz-Zehlendorf (the sixth borough of Berlin), upon the twinning of the two cities in 2012.

=== Hungary ===
- Budapest – two sections of the Berlin Wall were originally placed on Krisztina Blvd, in the Tabán district of the city. These were later moved, after someone painted them completely red, to the garden of the Maltese Charity Service in Budapest, where they still stand. Another section of the Berlin Wall was erected in front of Budapest's House of Terror Museum on Thursday, November 11, 2010, in the presence of Hungarian and German politicians. The ceremony marked the 21st anniversary of the fall of the wall.

=== Iceland ===
- Reykjavík – a segment of wall was gifted to the City of Reykjavík from the Neu West Berlin Art Gallery on October 3, 2015, the Day of German Unity, coinciding with the 25th anniversary of German unification in 1990. As of 2022, this segment of the Berlin Wall is on display at the end of the parking for the Höfði House, where Ronald Reagan and Mikhail Gorbachev held their Reykjavík Summit in October 1986.

=== Ireland ===
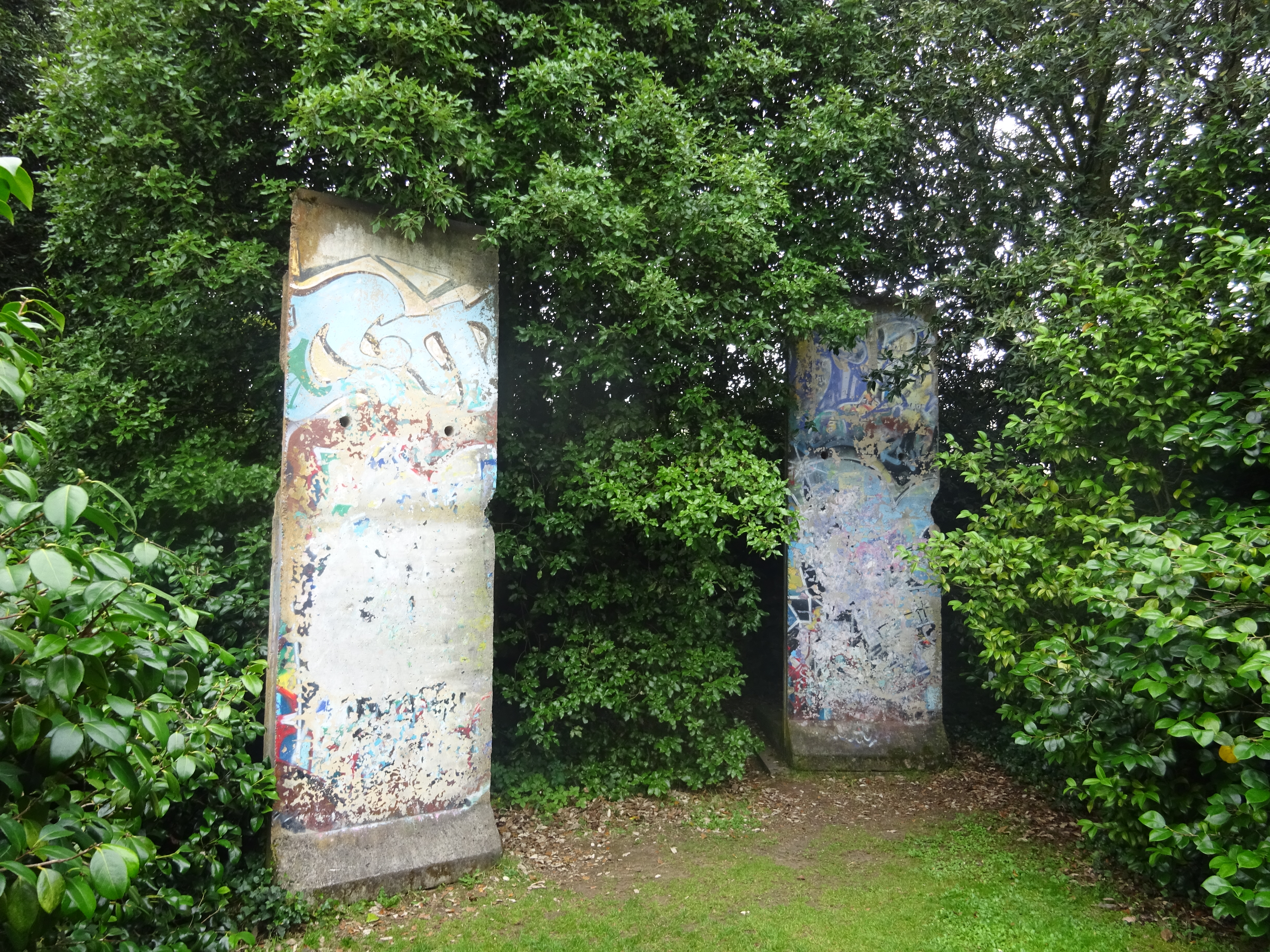
Segments in Lismore Castle gardens

- Lismore – two segments were installed in the public gardens of Lismore Castle, County Waterford in 2015.

=== Italy ===
- Spilamberto – on Valentine's Day 2008, ten segments of the Berlin Wall were delivered to the town of Spilamberto, near Modena. Three of these segments are in public display in the garden of the Rocca Rangoni. By displaying the pieces the town of Spilamberto hopes to affirm its self-proclaimed identity as a town of diversity.

=== Latvia ===
- Riga – a segment of the Berlin Wall has been placed in Kronvalda Park, in front of the former Communist Party Central Committee headquarters.

=== Luxembourg ===
- Schengen – a segment stands about 100 m from the place where the Schengen Agreement was signed in 1985.

=== Norway ===
- Trondheim – displayed with the word "SALE" on four pieces, it is located beside Solsiden Mall and Portalen.

=== Poland ===
- Gdańsk – a complete section is displayed at the entrance to Roads to Freedom exhibition at the Solidarity Museum, adjacent to a section of the wall Lech Wałęsa climbed to lead the shipyard workers campaign.
- Warsaw – four sections are located in the open air, at the corner of Świętokrzyska and Kopernika Streetz, as part of the Solidarity Memorial monument. Another section is in the Museum of John Paul II and Primate Wyszyński in the Temple of Divine Providence.

=== Portugal ===
- Fátima – the Sanctuary of Our Lady of Fátima, in Cova da Iria, contains a segment of the Wall on the south side of the Rectory. This segment was offered by means of Virgilio Casimiro Ferreira, a Portuguese immigrant to Germany, and is incorporated into a memorial designed by the architect J. Carlos Loureiro, inaugurated on 13 August 1994.
- São João da Madeira – a segment of wall is on display in the sculpture park of Oliva Creative Factory, home to the Centro de Arte Oliva. This segment of the Berlin Wall from Potsdamer Platz was acquired by collectors Norlinda and José Lima in 2018 and donated to the local municipality in 2021, 30 km outside Porto.

=== Romania ===
- Timișoara – a segment of the Berlin Wall outside of the Revolution Memorial in the city where the 1989 Romanian Revolution against Nicolae Ceaușescu began.

=== Russia ===
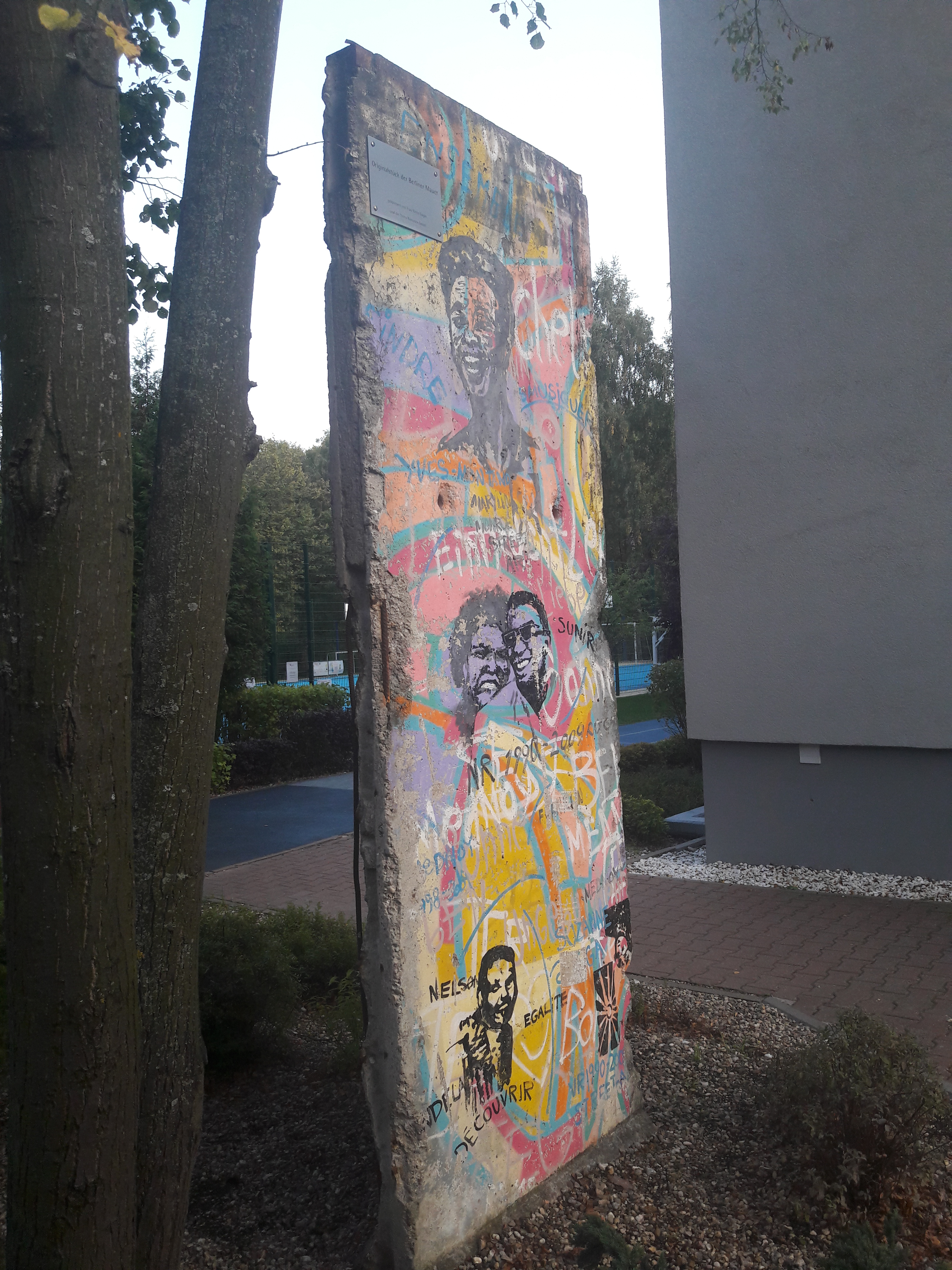
Fragment of the original part of the Berlin wall in Moscow (on the grounds of a German school)

- Moscow – in 1990 the fragment of the wall was presented by the Berlin authorities to the Saharov Museum and Public Centre. Another fragment of the Berlin Wall has been installed on the grounds of a German school.

=== Spain ===
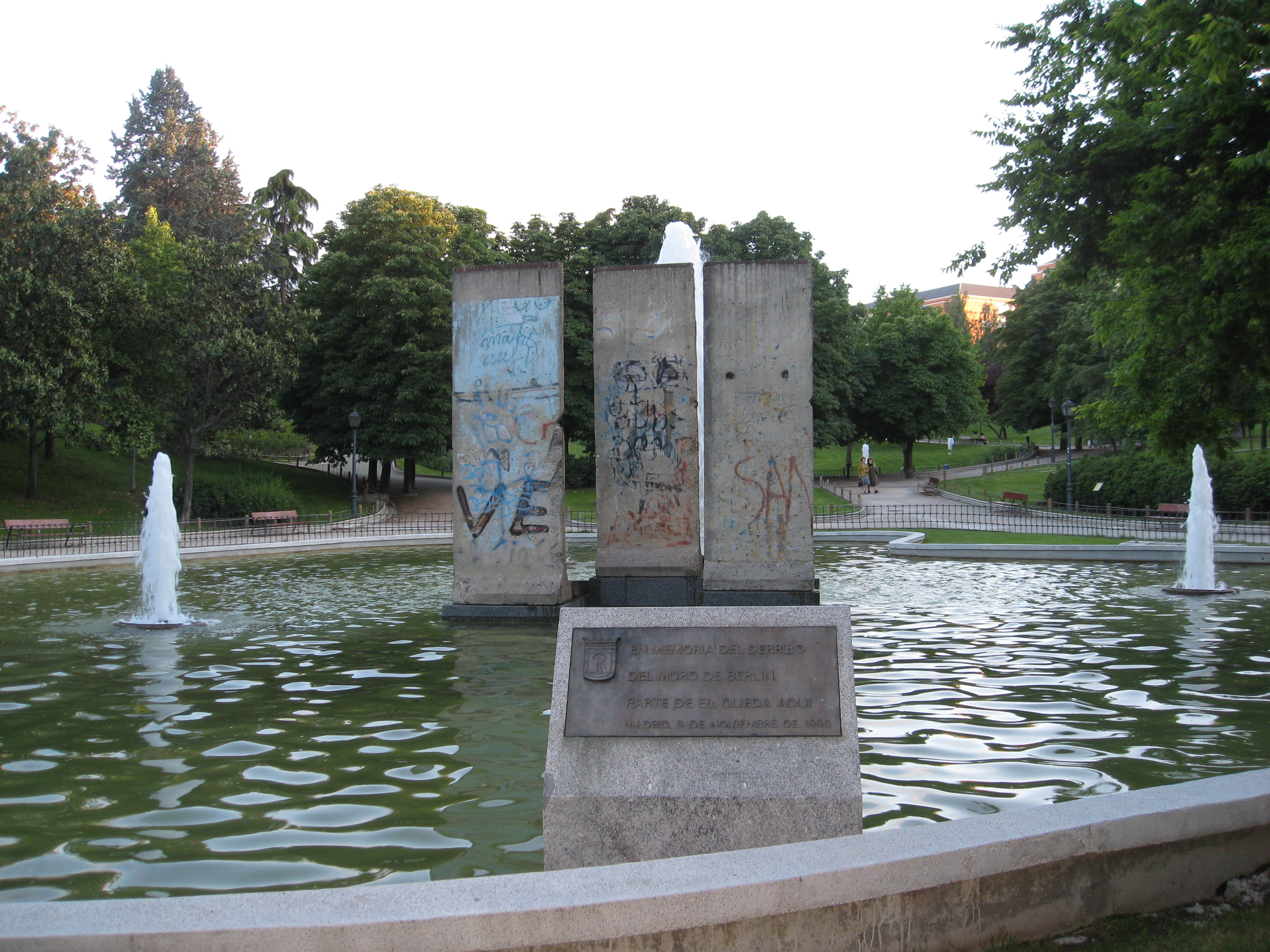
Three segments of the Berlin wall in the Parque de Berlín (Berlin Park), Madrid, Spain

- Madrid – three sections of the Berlin Wall are installed as the centrepiece of a pond in the Parque de Berlín, in the Chamartín district. These segments were a present from the City of Berlin to the City of Madrid and were inaugurated on November 9, 1990 (first anniversary of the fall). Another segment of wall can be found in Torrejón de Ardoz outside Madrid, in the Parque Europa.
- Redondela, Galicia – a segment of wall stands outside the Multiusos da Xunqueira.
- Seville – a section of wall stands in the Isla Mágica theme park.

=== Sweden ===
- Trelleborg – a segment stands on the Astrid Lindgren Allé, outside town library.

=== Ukraine ===
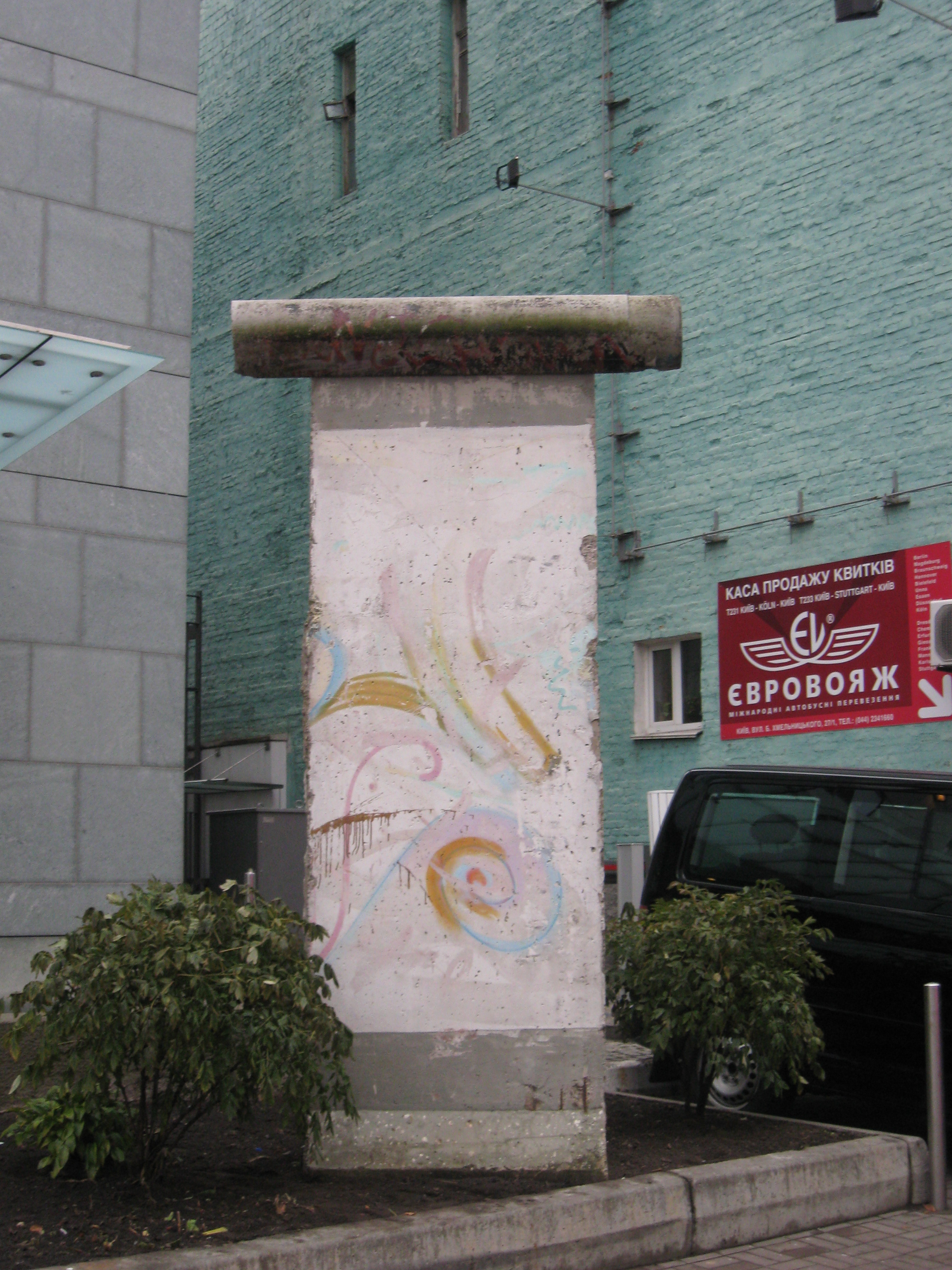
A segment of the wall is on display outside the German embassy building in Kyiv, Ukraine

- Kyiv – a segment of the wall is on display outside the German Embassy.

=== United Kingdom ===
- Berwick-upon-Tweed – a segment stands outside Berwick Barracks.
- Bodmin – a large piece of the Berlin Wall (believed to be one of the largest in the UK after the Imperial War Museum London) is on display at the Cornwall Regimental Museum in Bodmin.
- Cosford – a segment of the Berlin Wall stands in the Checkpoint Charlie exhibit at the Royal Air Force Museum at Cosford. A major display, dealing with the British role in the Four Power Control of Berlin, is centred upon a dramatised section of the wall as part of the National Cold War Exhibition.
- Duxford – a segment of the Berlin Wall stands in the American Air Museum Hangar at the Imperial War Museum Duxford.
- Eastnor estate - a segment that previously stood near Meyenburg was installed in the grounds of Eastnor Castle, Herefordshire in December 2025.
- Gillingham – three segments are part of the BAOR display at the Royal Engineers Museum. Until 2011 these sections were displayed outside the museum.

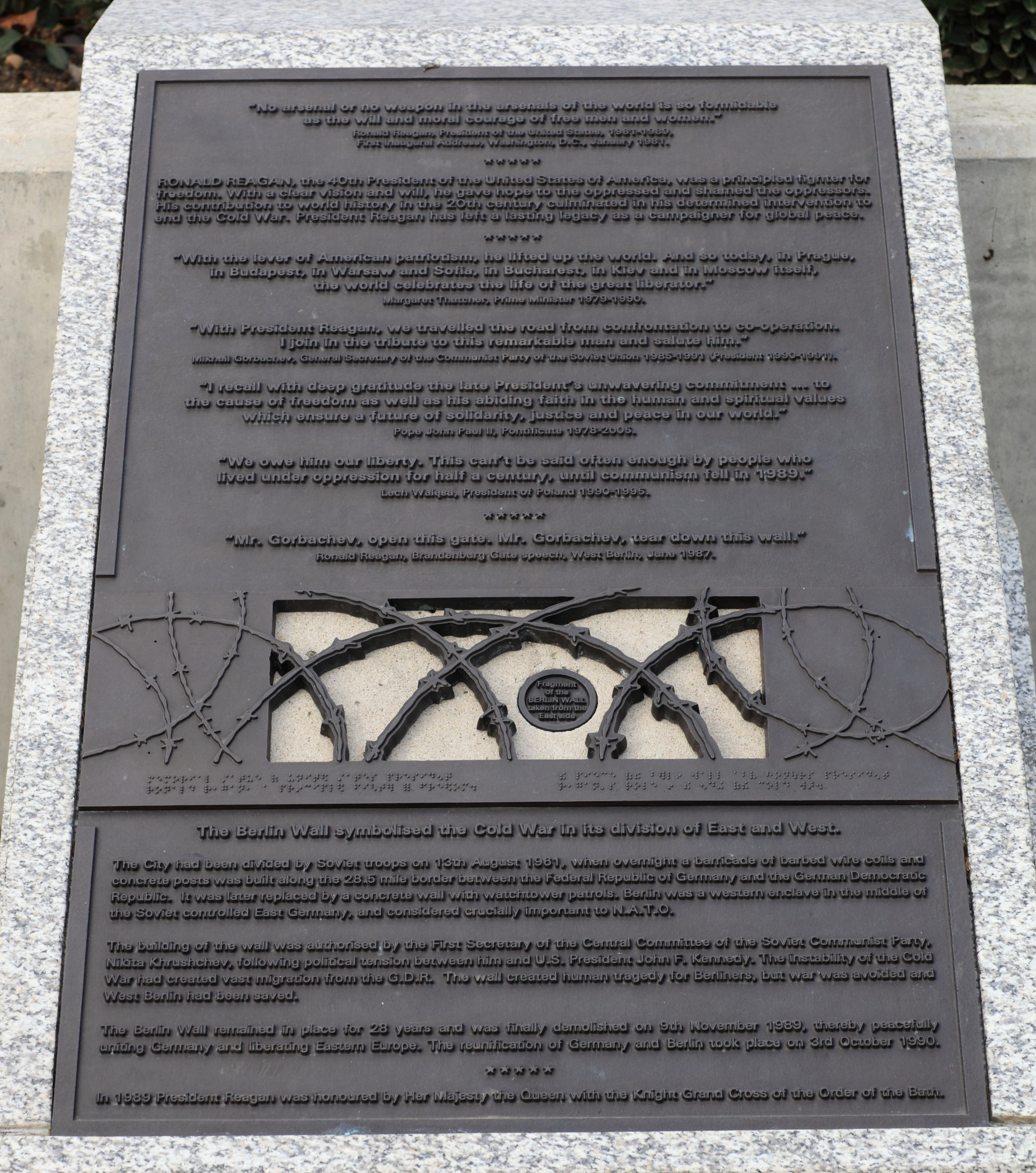
A segment of the Berlin Wall is in front of Ronald Reagan's statue in Grosvenor Square in London

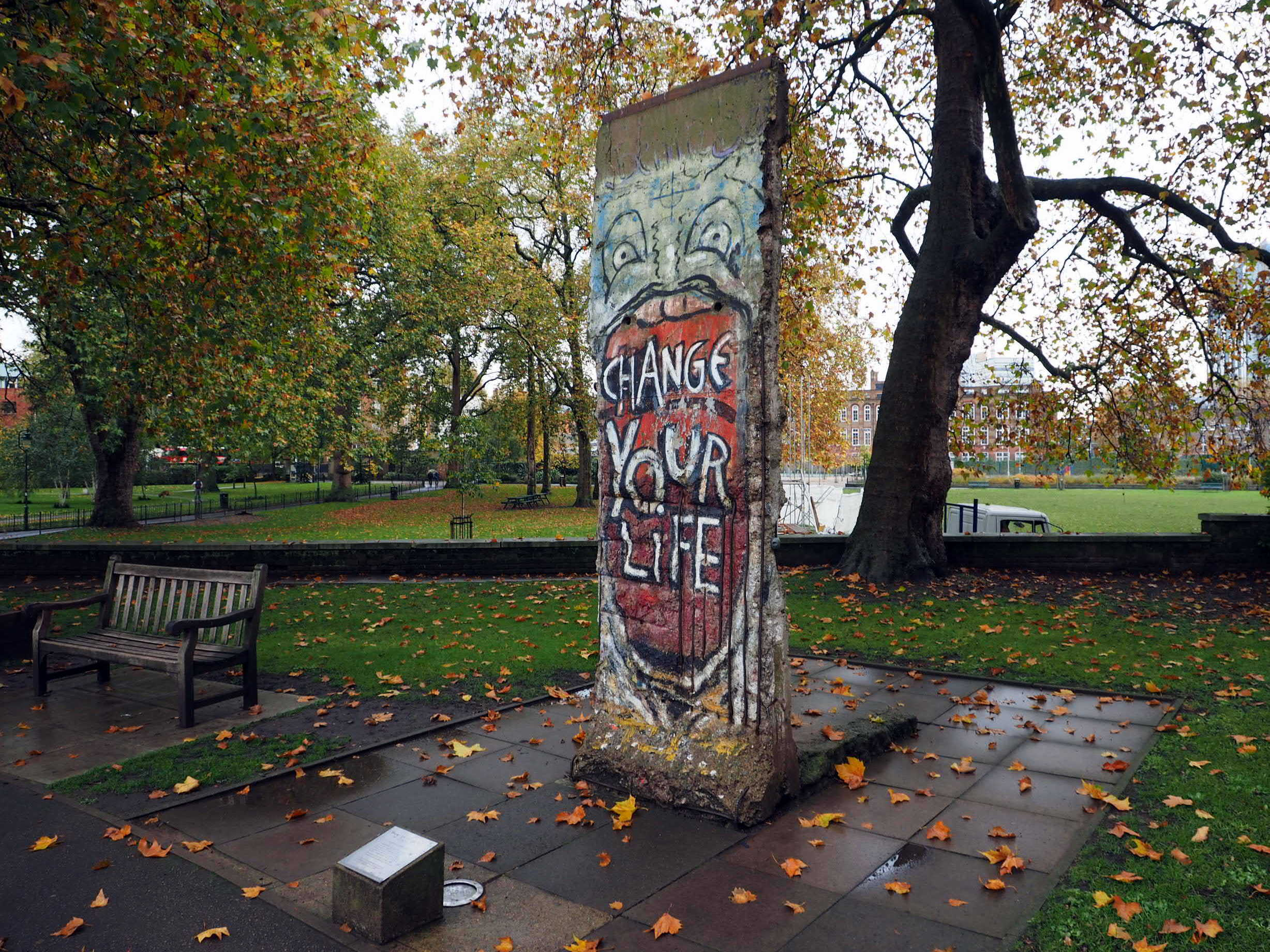
A segment of the Berlin Wall stands outside the Imperial War Museum in London

- London
  - A segment of the Berlin Wall forms part of a large monumental plaque, next to the memorial to Ronald Reagan in Grosvenor Square in Mayfair.
  - A section stands near the sports hall of the German School in Richmond.
  - In Southwark the Imperial War Museum, displays segments inside the museum, and in Geraldine Mary Harmsworth Park just outside it. Another segment is on display inside the museum.
  - In Lewisham Shopping Centre, outside the Migration Museum, WALL, two separate surviving segments of the Berlin Wall are on display with artwork painted on by contemporary artists STIK and Thierry Noir.
  - At the National Army Museum in Chelsea, three segments are displayed outside the museum, with another segment displayed internally.
- Manchester – a segment is on display at Imperial War Museum North.
- Wareham - seven segments are displayed in a forest at Carey's Secret Garden.

=== Vatican City ===
- The Vatican – a section of Berlin wall is displayed in the Vatican Gardens. It was gifted to the Vatican by Marco Piccininni in August 1994 after Piccininni acquired it in an auction of wall segments in Monte Carlo in 1990. The segments from the Oranienplatz show part of St Michael's Church in Mitte; the parish of which was divided by the wall. A clear view of St Michael's from the Oranienplatz was not possible between 1961 and 1990, because of the Berlin Wall. The lower half of the church, which could not be seen because of the concrete segments of the wall, was painted on the western part of the wall, as Trompe-l'œil, by the Berlin-based, Iranian artist Yadegar Asisi on the initiative of Berlin architect Bernhard Strecker, in order to demonstrate the "permeability" of the wall (Mauerdurchblick).

== North America ==
=== Canada ===
Manitoba

- Steinbach – a section of the Berlin Wall is on permanent display on the grounds of the Mennonite Heritage Village.

Nova Scotia

- Dartmouth – a piece of the Berlin Wall is on display at the World Peace Pavilion in the Halifax Regional Municipality on city waterfront. It is encased in a display case, along with other items of importance from around the world.
- Lunenburg – there is a large piece of the wall situated on Duke St in front of the Royal Canadian Legion branch.
- Truro – six large pieces of the Berlin Wall are in the possession of the town and are currently on display at Dalhousie's Agricultural Campus in Bible Hill. There are plans to move them to the nearby Diefenbunker museum in Debert in the near future.

Ontario

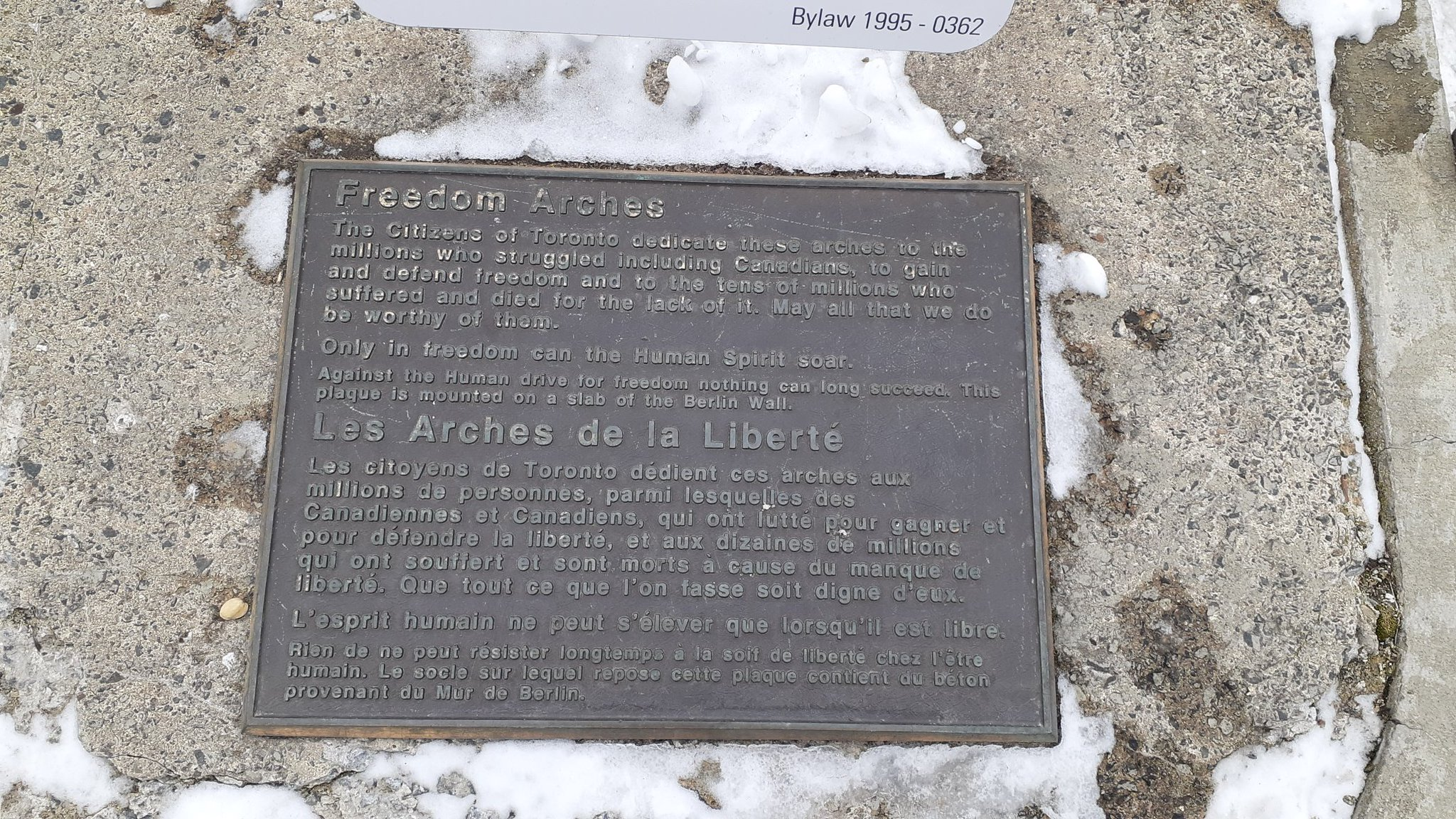
Plaque located at the base of the Freedom Arches at Nathan Phillips Square which rests on a piece of the Berlin Wall

- Toronto – a small chunk of the Berlin Wall is embedded into the base of the Freedom Arches in Nathan Phillips Square near Toronto City Hall. The arches were dedicated in 1989, to commemorate those who fought to obtain or defend freedom.
- Ottawa – a section of the Berlin Wall is on permanent display in the Canadian War Museum.
- Niagara Falls - a section of the Berlin Wall is on display at the Ripley's Believe it or Not Museum.

Québec

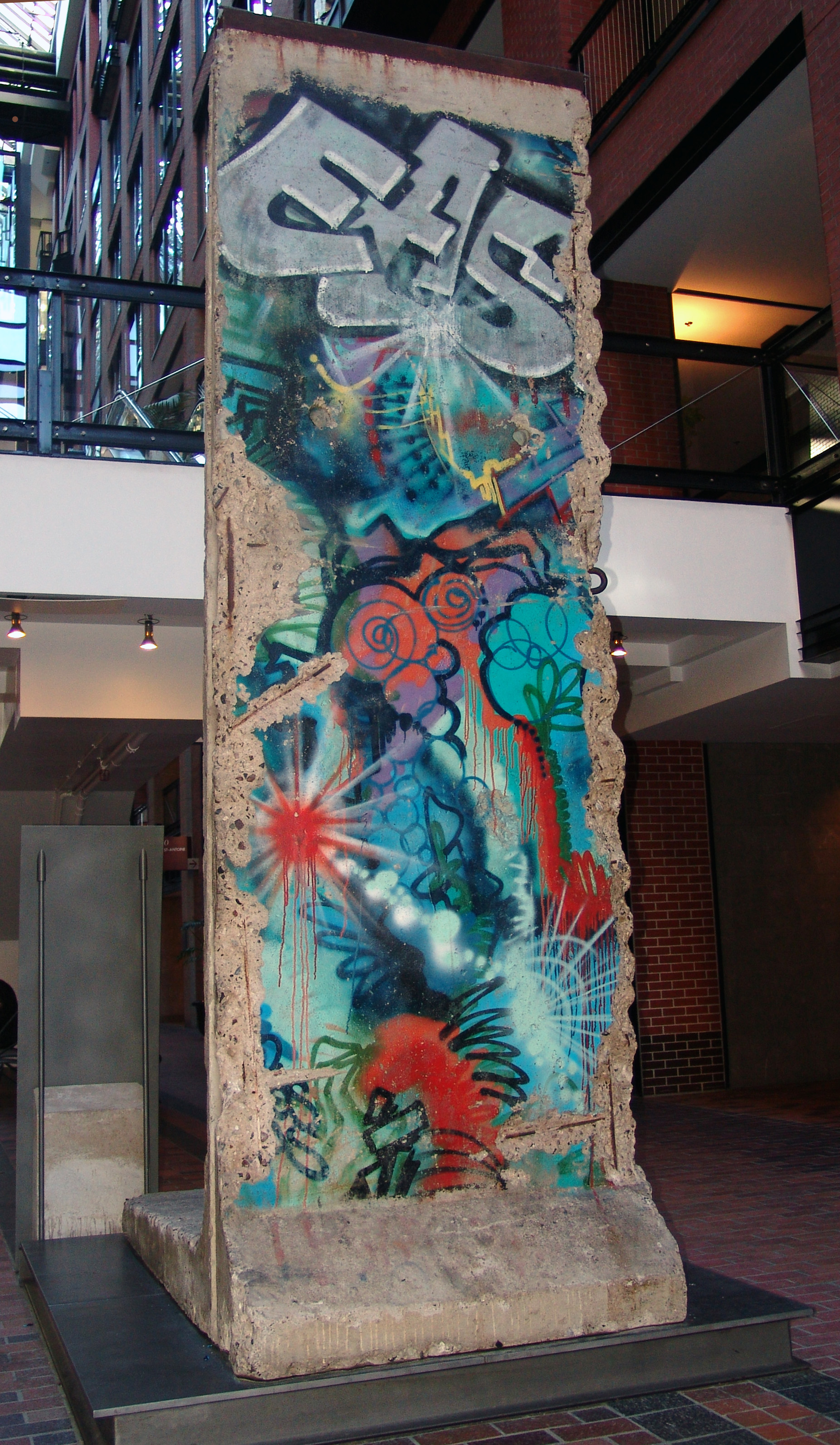
Western side of the Montréal segment of the Berlin Wall at Centre de Commerce Mondial

- Montréal – a segment of the Berlin Wall has been given by the city of Berlin to the city of Montréal in 1992 for its 350th birthday. The segment comes from a location near Brandenburg Gate and is now displayed in the Centre de Commerce Mondial.

=== Mexico ===
- Mexico City- a large segment of the Berlin Wall is located in the Colegio Alemán Alexander von Humboldt in the Xochimilco district.
- Mexico City- a segment of wall is in display at the entrance of the Memory and Tolerance Museum.

=== United States ===
Alabama

- Birmingham - a segment of the wall is in display at the Southern Museum of Flight.

Arizona

- Flagstaff – a segment of wall showing the reinforcing rebars within it, is on display in the Student's Union at Northern Arizona University.
- Fort Huachuca – a section of the wall is displayed in the Military Intelligence Heritage Museum.

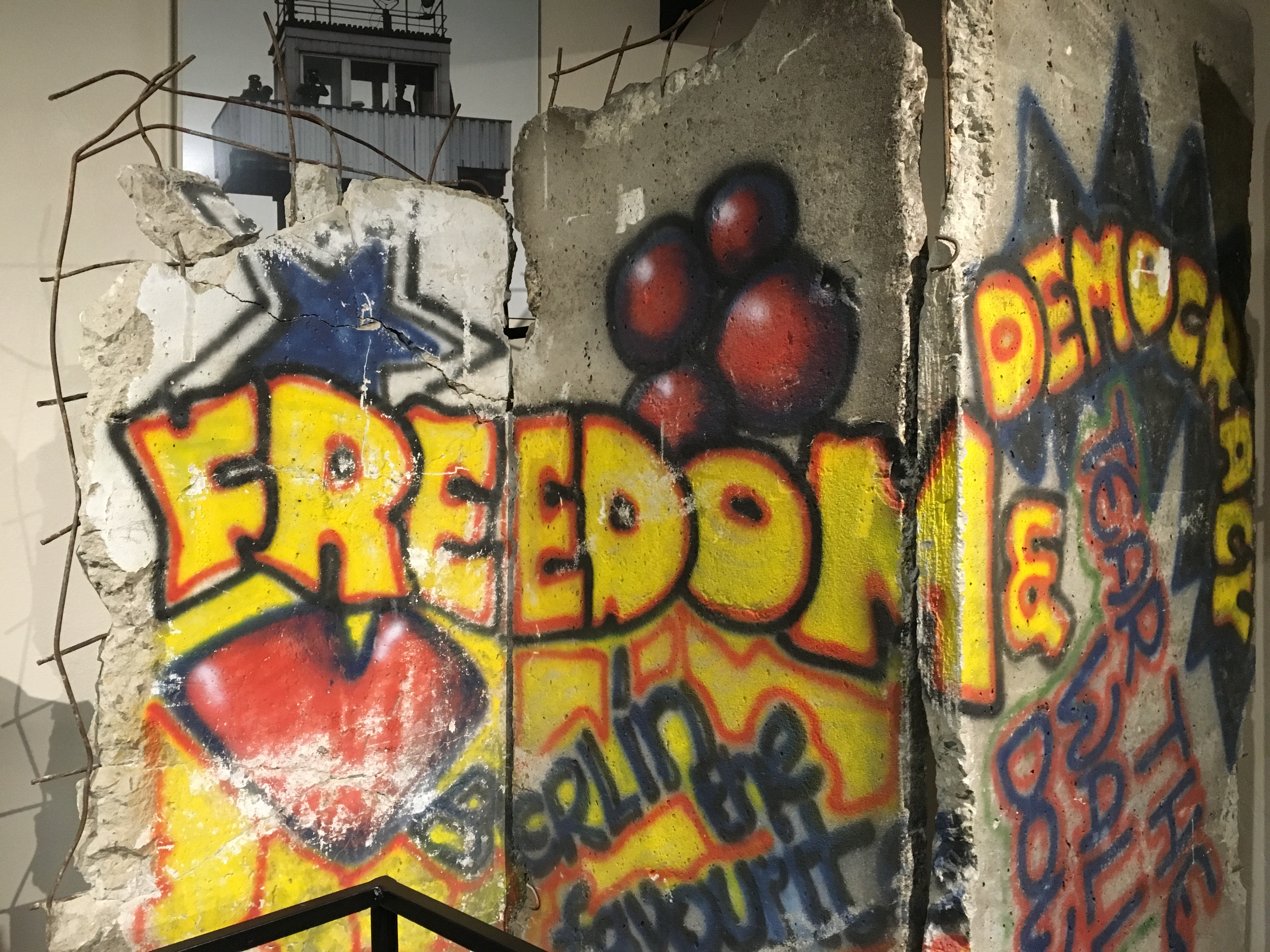
Section at Fort Huachuca, Arizona

Arkansas

- Eureka Springs – a ten-foot by ten-foot section of the Berlin Wall was erected next to the Church in the Grove. On it, is painted in German "though I walk through the dark valley, I will not fear" from Psalm 23. The church acquired this piece as a tribute and celebration of the Christian faith in the face of adversity.

California

- Culver City – the Wende Museum and Archive of the Cold War features a wall segment that stands at the museum's entrance, which was painted by the French-born, Berlin-based artist Thierry Noir. The exhibition Facing the Wall: Living with the Berlin Wall, currently on display at the Wende Museum explores how the Wall became part of the urban fabric of Berlin, and the place where the realities of political ideology and personal experience came face to face. The museum's Berlin Wall segment was augmented in 2010 by 10 additional sections, constituting the longest stretch outside of Berlin. They are currently on display in front of the 5900 Wilshire Boulevard building, painted and installed as part of the Wende's project organized to commemorate the 20th anniversary of the fall of the Berlin Wall.

Berlin Wall segment in the Wende Museum, Los Angeles

- Los Angeles – a segment of wall is displayed on the main campus of Loyola Marymount University. Other segments can be found at the Variety Building on 5900 Wilshire and the Reef Building Downtown at 1933 S Broadway as part of the LUME Street art Exhibit. At the latter, RISK (graffiti artist) decorated the segments with his signature Butterflies while the Svetlana Talabolina dedicated a section statelessness.
- Monterey – three segments are on display at the U.S. Army Defense Language Institute-Foreign Language Center.

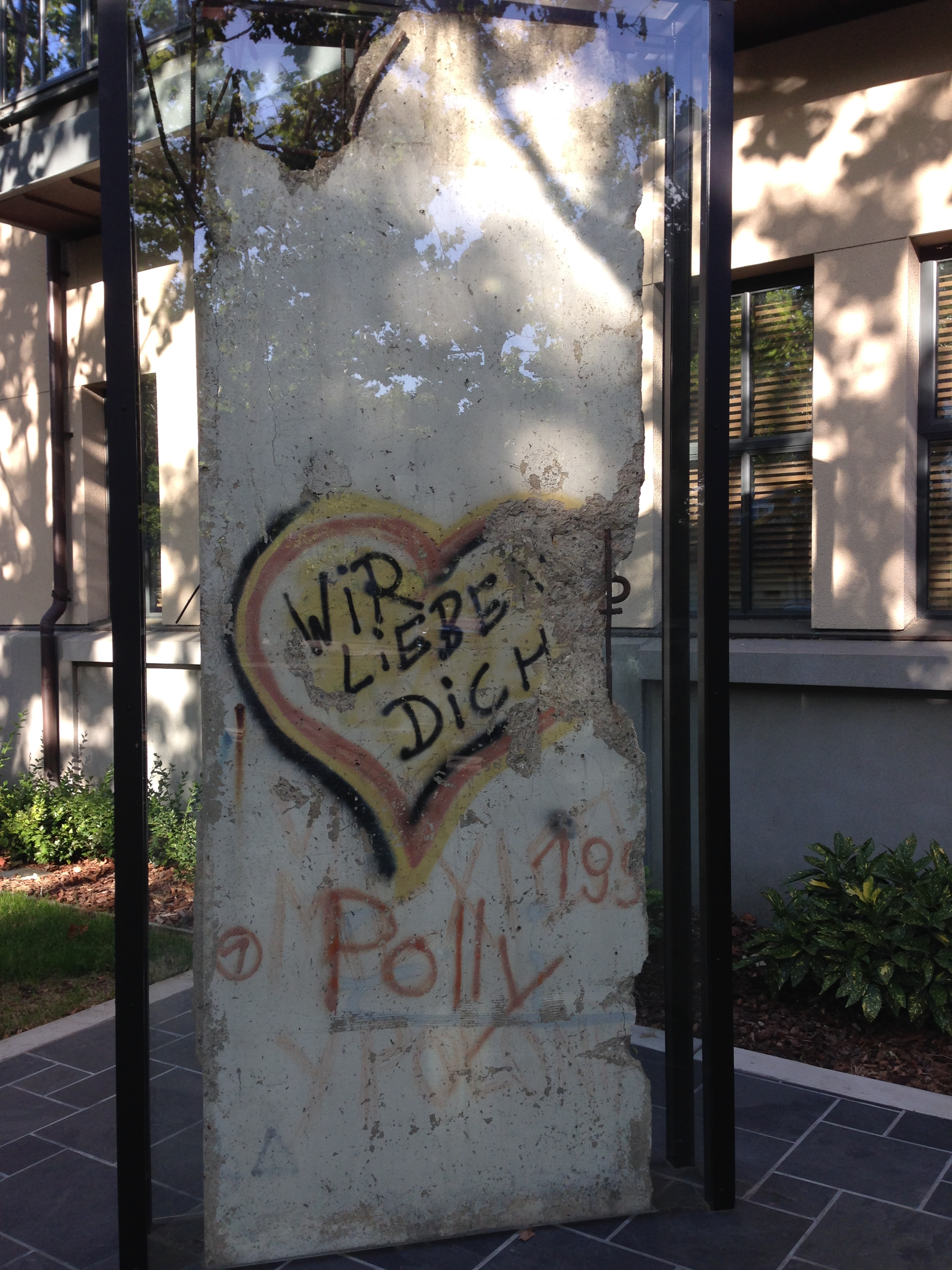
Segment at Mountain View Public Library

- Mountain View – two segments of the wall are displayed outside of the Mountain View Public Library. A plaque memorializes the fall of the wall as "a tribute to American resolve." A cartoon of Elvis is painted on one segment, and the other has a heart drawn around the words "Wir lieben Dich" (We love you), along with "Polly" and "1990". The segments and plaque were relocated to this location after they were donated to the city by the descendants of a German-born American businessman, Frank Golzen, who originally displayed them on the grounds of his own office park at 2685 Marine Way in Mountain View. In 2015, the original painter of this heart graffito, a Berliner named Robin Pohle, discovered via his friend Christoph Schmidt that the wall section they had decorated in 1990 somehow made its way to Mountain View. Robin Pohle and two other friends painted the farewell message on the wall in 1990 because their friend "Polly", whose real name is Andrea von Coburg, was moving away from Berlin to Munich. They snapped a photo of themselves next to the graffito in its original location in Berlin, and gave Coburg a framed print as a farewell gift. In 2015, after the rediscovery, Merkur.de published a snapshot of "Polly" (von Coburg) holding the photo. She identifies the original location of the wall segment and photo as Engelbecken ("angel's corner") but this name loosely referred to the entire border area that long ago used to be a canal, the Luisenstädtischer Kanal ("Luisenstadt Canal"), running from today's Engelbecken along what is now Bethaniendamm, next to the Baumhaus an der Mauer.

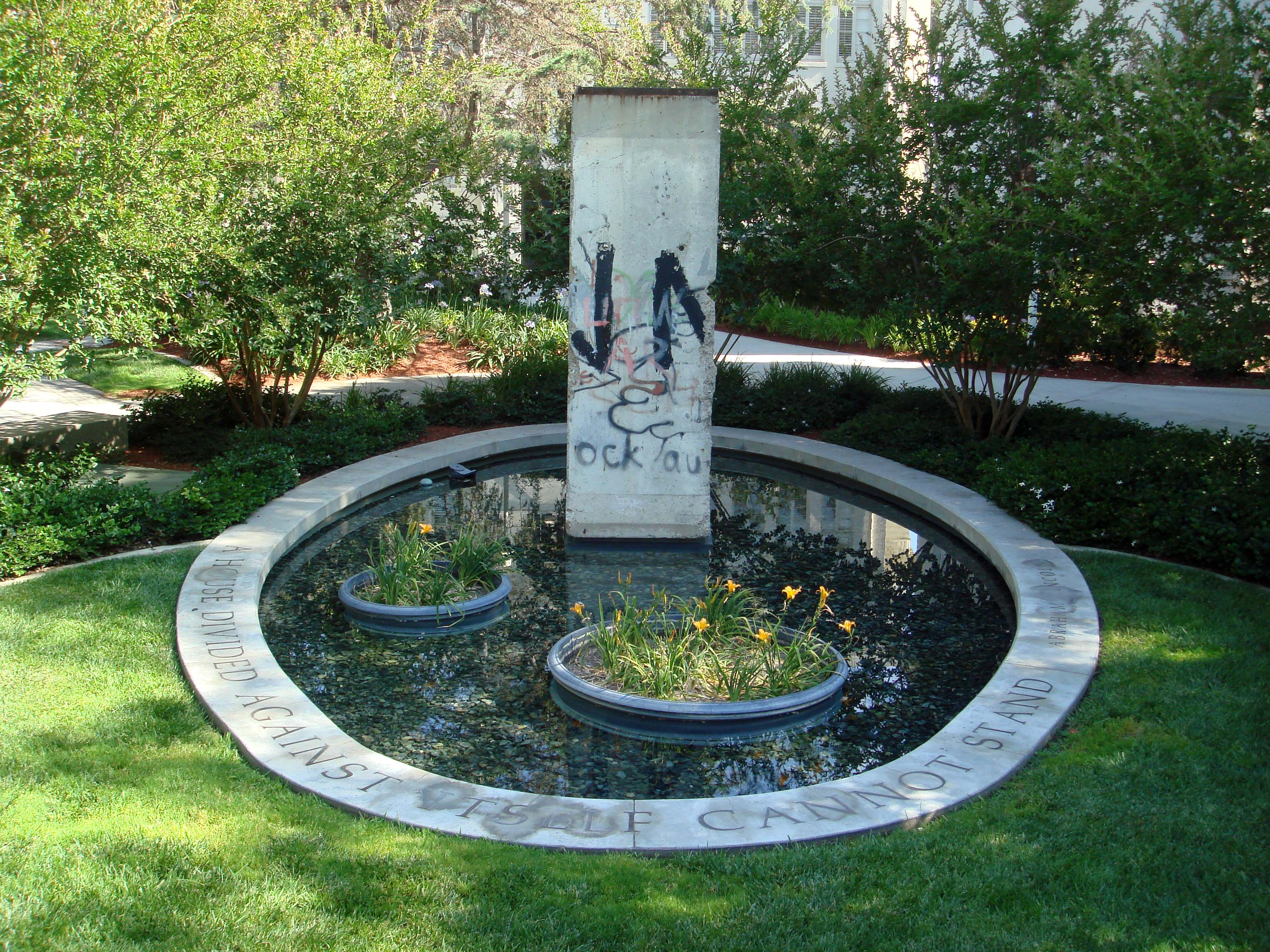
Segment at Chapman University

- Orange – Chapman University's main campus displays the second largest piece of the Berlin Wall owned by an American university west of the Mississippi River.
- San Bernardino – a 4-meter (13 ft) segment of the Berlin Wall was dedicated at the Ronald Reagan Park as part of the Reagan centenary celebrations. The wall segment has been repainted with a black and white image of President Reagan along with his quote "Mr. Gorbachev, tear down this wall! 6/12/1987 adorning one side.
- Santa Barbara – a section of the Berlin Wall greets visitors as they arrive at the Rancho del Cielo, reminding of Ronald Reagan's role in calling for the Wall to be torn down.
- Simi Valley – a segment of the Berlin Wall is on display in Ronald Reagan Presidential Library.
- Yorba Linda – a segment of the Berlin Wall is on display at the Richard Nixon Library & Birthplace. The Nixon Library's segment of the wall is similar in size to the segment of the wall displayed at the Reagan Library.

Colorado

- Denver – Captain Herbert Light brought a piece of the Berlin Wall to Colorado, where it is paired with a sculpture by Veryl Goodnight called "The Day the Wall Came Down at the Mizel Museum."

Florida

- Miami – four segments of the wall are now in the public art collection of Ironside. They were temporarily displayed in South Beach during Art Basel 2013 fair before becoming the symbol of the district.
- Orlando – a segment of the wall stands outside of the Hard Rock Cafe at Universal CityWalk.

Georgia

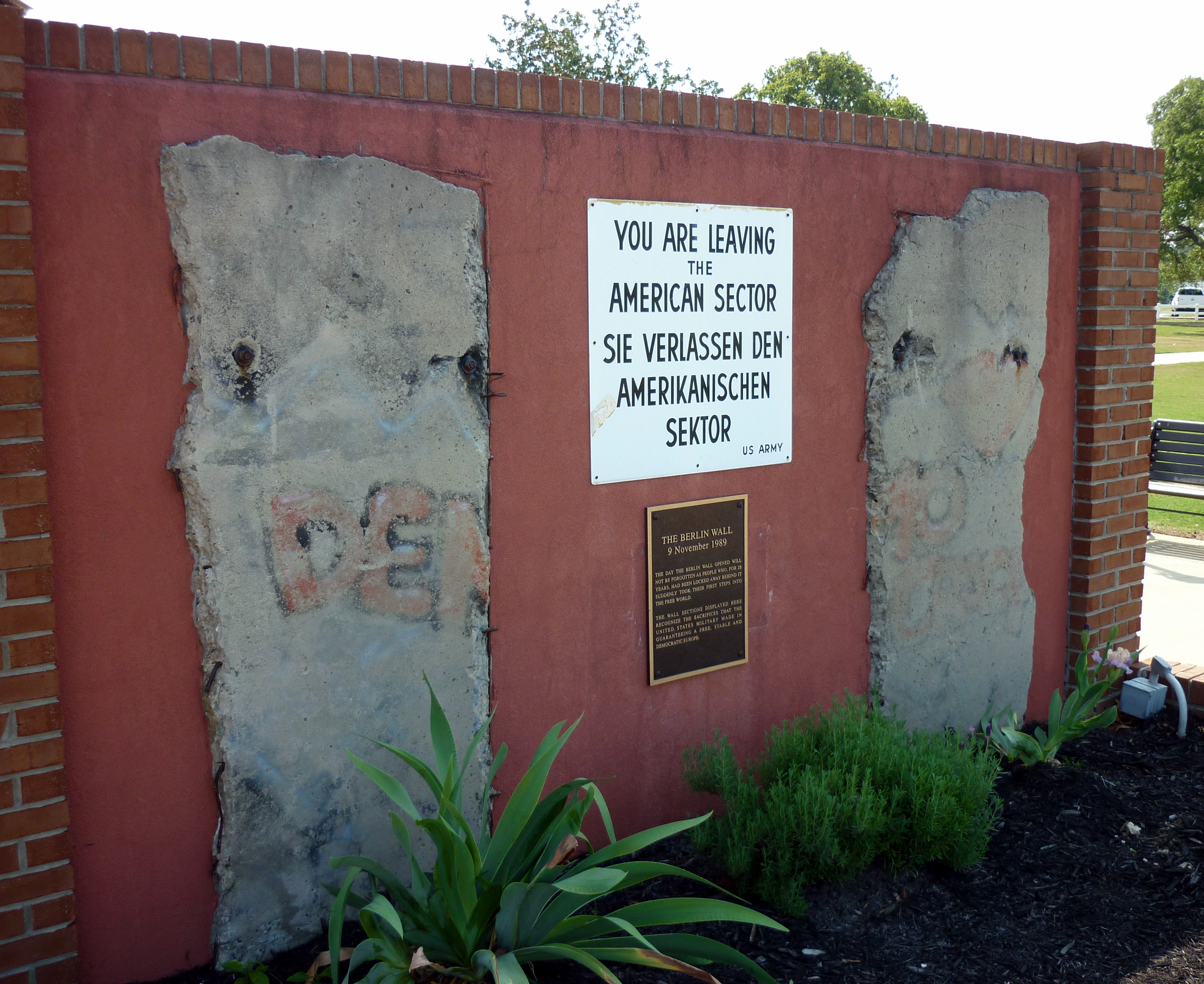
Fort Gordon's display of sections of the Berlin Wall

- Atlanta – a segment of the wall stands on the campus of the Atlanta International School.
- Fort Benning – three sections of the Wall are part of the U.S. Army's collection on display at the National Infantry Museum in the "Cold War" gallery.
- Fort Eisenhower – two sections of the Berlin Wall are incorporated in a display that includes a plaque inscribed to "recognize the sacrifices that the United States military made in guaranteeing a free, stable and democratic Europe" in Freedom Park on this US Army installation near Augusta. There is also a segment of the wall at the Signal Corps Museum located within Fort Eisenhower.
- Kennesaw – a piece of the Berlin Wall was given to Kennesaw State University on loan, which is being displayed outside of the Social Science building.
- Suwannee – a piece of the Berlin Wall is on display in the town center park.

Hawaii

- Honolulu – a slab of the wall rests secretly behind the University of Hawaii Honolulu Community College book store on campus.

Idaho

- Sandpoint – a segment of the Berlin Wall, protected by plexiglass, is located on the Hope Peninsula.

Illinois

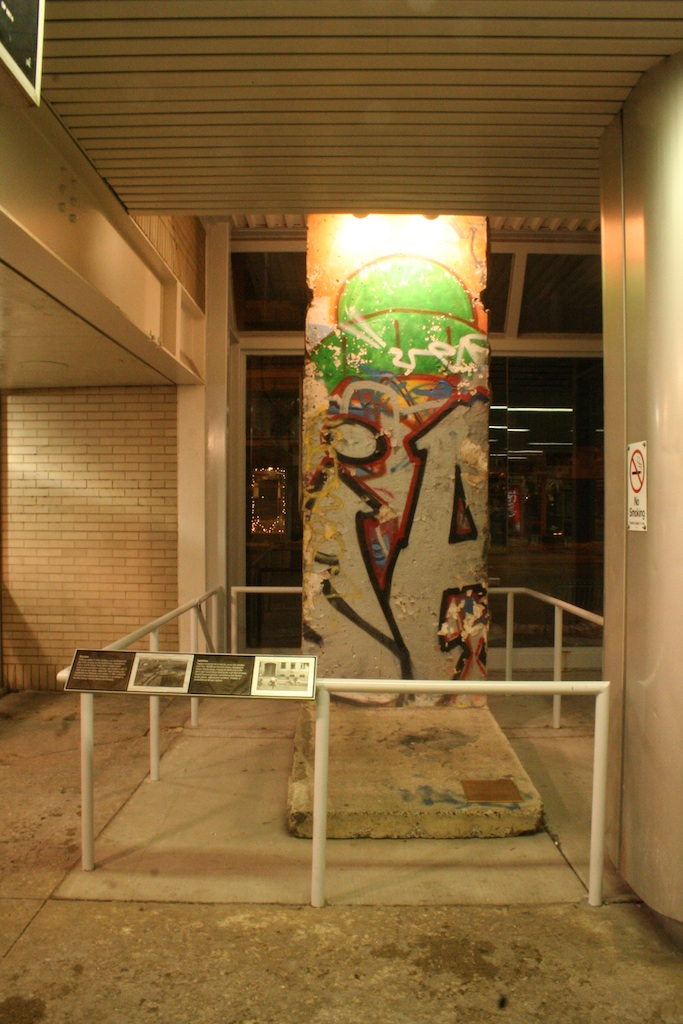
Segment of the Berlin Wall inside the Brown Line Western station on the Chicago "L"

- Chicago – the Chicago Berlin Monument contains a segment of the wall inside the Western station on the Chicago "L" Brown Line. The Lincoln Square neighborhood that the station serves has been historically German.

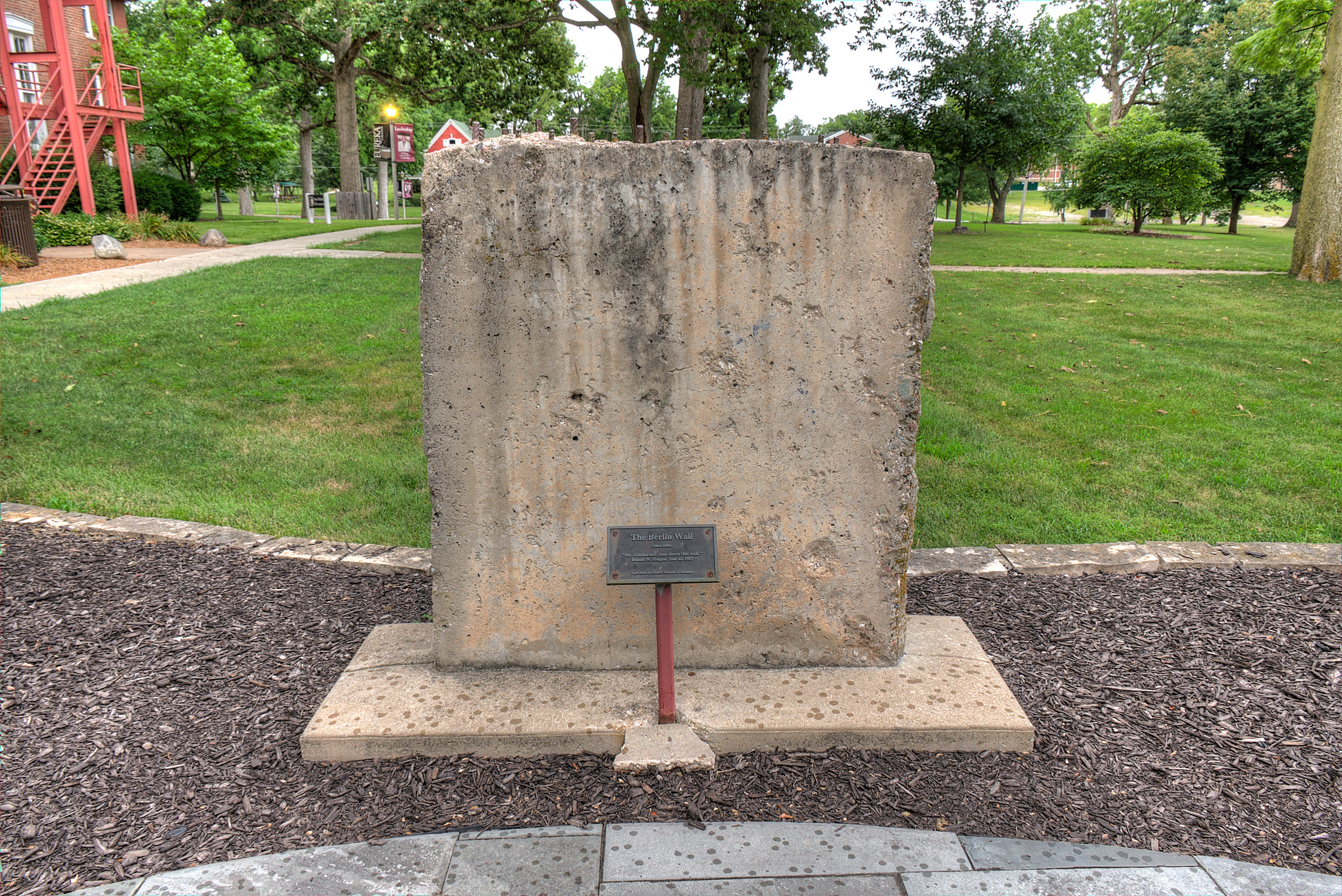
Segment of Berlin Wall at Eureka College

- Eureka – In a May 9, 1982 speech at Eureka College, President Reagan challenged the Soviet Union to a new era of negotiations to reduce nuclear arms—called START. A segment of the Berlin Wall is on display in the Ronald Reagan Peace Garden on campus.
- Wheaton – a segment of the wall is located at Cantigny Park's First Division museum.

Kansas

- Hutchinson – a section of the wall is in the Cosmosphere's Hall of Space exhibit at the Kansas Cosmosphere and Space Center.
- Fort Leavenworth – three sections are displayed in a "falling position" just east of the fort's lake near the Buffalo Soldiers Monument.
- Wichita – a section of the wall is on loan to the Museum of World Treasures from the American Overseas Schools Historical Society. The section was originally purchased by the Berlin Brats Alumni Association.

Kentucky

- Fort Knox – a section of the Berlin Wall containing graffiti with the words "democracy", "freedom", and the phrase "Tear the wall down" written on it can be found at the Patton Museum of Cavalry and Armor as a permanent exhibit.

Maine

- Portland – a 6 ft × 10 ft (2 m × 3 m) segment of the Berlin Wall is located on Long Wharf in the Old Port.

Maryland

- Ocean City – inside Ripley's Believe It or Not!

Massachusetts

- Amherst – a segment of the wall is located on the grounds of the University of Massachusetts Amherst.
- Boston – a section of the Wall was donated in 1989 by the German government and brought to the John F. Kennedy Library, with the help of Jean Kennedy Smith, the President's sister.

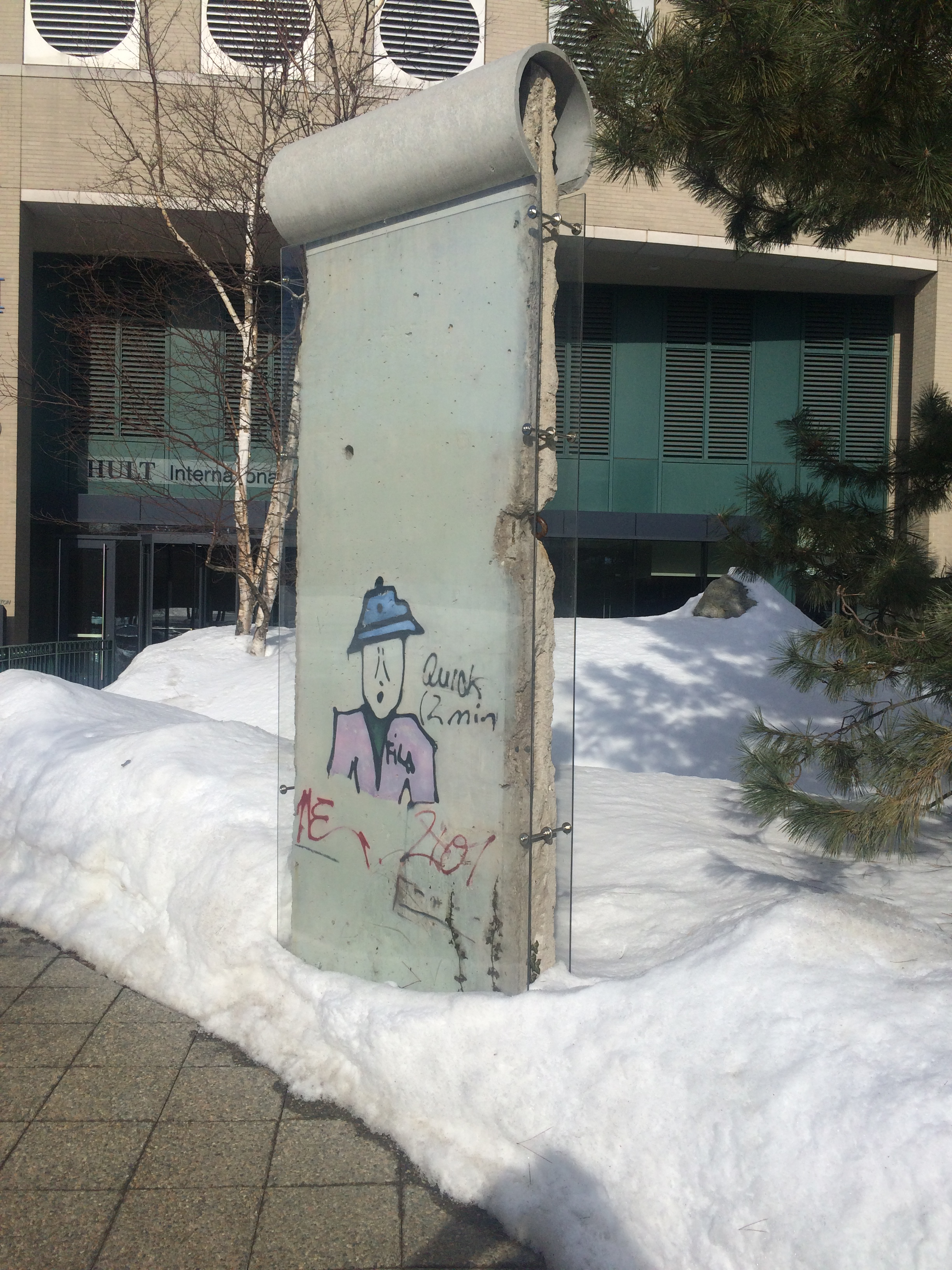
Section of the Berlin Wall in front of the Hult International Business School, Cambridge, Massachusetts

- Cambridge – a segment of the wall is located outside the main entrance to Hult International Business School.
- Stow – a segment of the wall is located in the American Heritage Museum on the grounds of the Collings Foundation.

Michigan

- Allendale - a segment of the wall is located on the campus at Grand Valley State University.
- Grand Rapids- sections of wall can be found: at the Gerald R. Ford Presidential Museum in the Meijer Lobby; in the lobby of the Grand Rapids Public Museum;.

Missouri

- Fort Leonard Wood – a segment of the Berlin Wall is located at the US Army Engineer Museum.

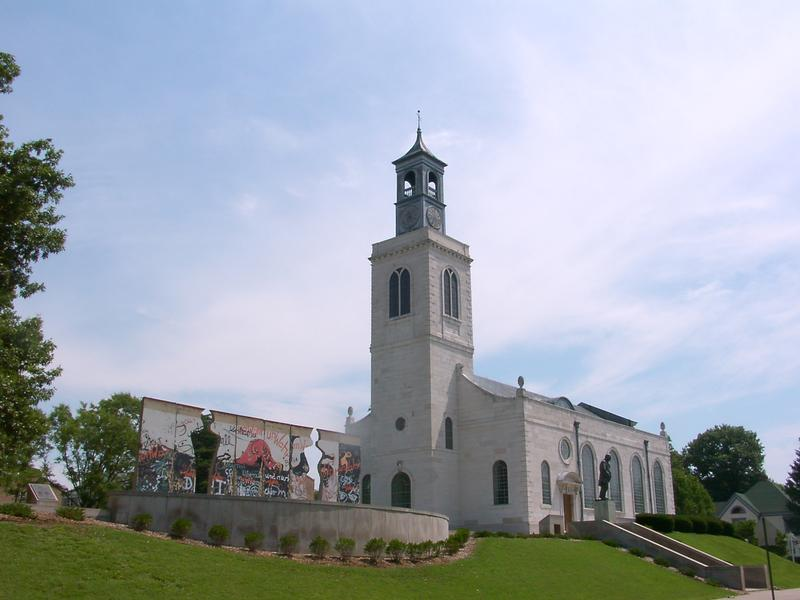
Winston Churchill Memorial Library at Westminster College in Fulton, Missouri; segment of the Berlin Wall in the lower left

- Fulton – eight segments of the Wall can be seen at Westminster College, where Winston Churchill gave his famous Iron Curtain speech. The pieces of wall chosen by Churchill's granddaughter Edwina Sandys from an area near the Brandenburg Gate, and they were gifted by the Berlin authorities to the college in 1990, to become part of the Winston Churchill Memorial Library.

New Jersey

- Camden – a section of the Berlin Wall is located on private property.
- Secaucus - a small portion of the Berlin Wall is located in Laurel Hill Park. The piece was donated in 2025.

New York

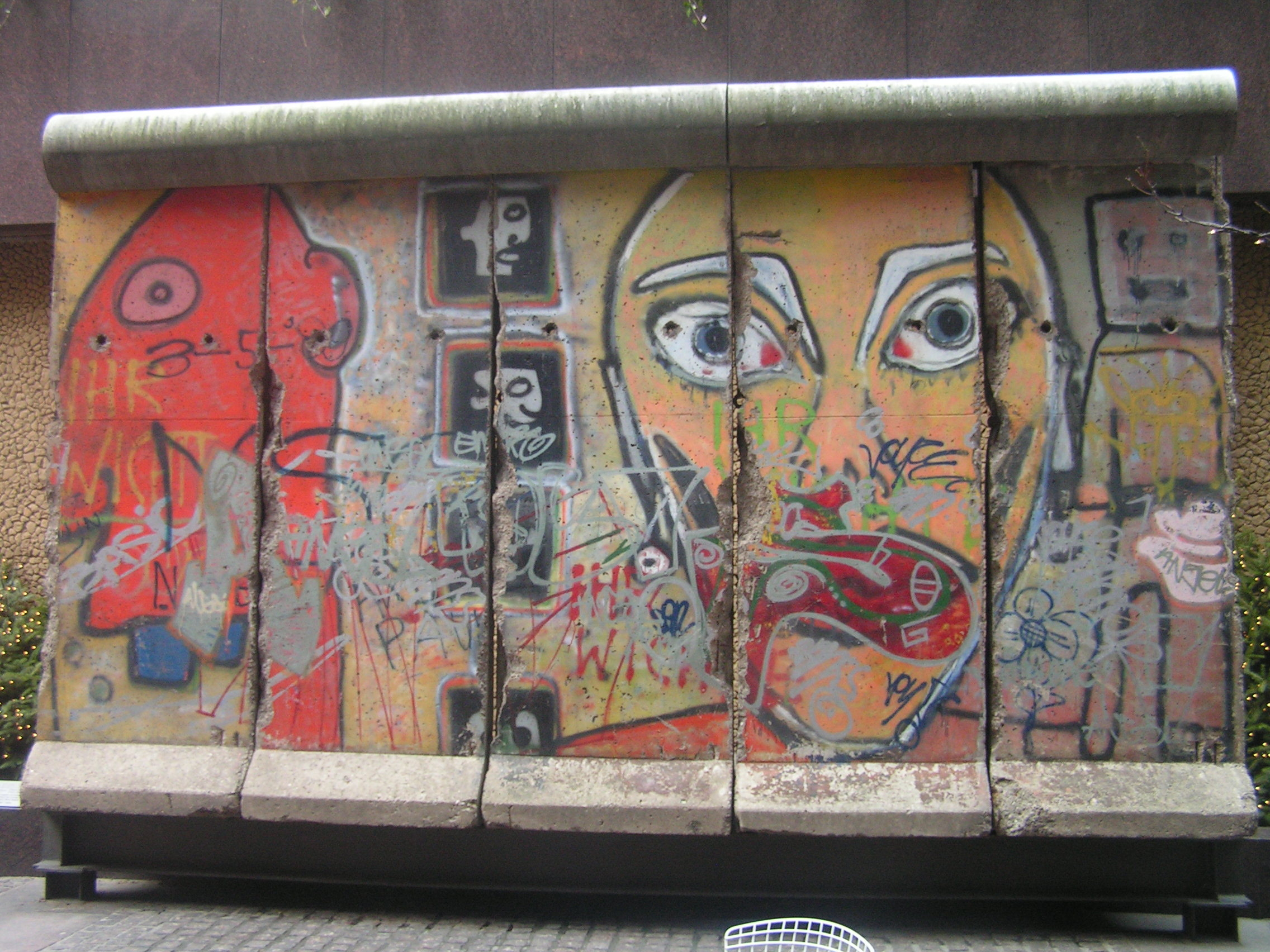
Segment of the Berlin Wall in Paley Park on 53rd Street between Fifth and Madison Avenues, now relocated to the lobby of the building next door

- Hamilton – a fragment of the wall is located on the campus of Colgate University.
- Hyde Park – two wall sections originally at Fulton, Missouri are displayed outside the Franklin D. Roosevelt Presidential Library and Museum, standing on a base inscribed with Franklin D. Roosevelt's Four Freedoms (freedom of speech, freedom of worship, freedom from want, freedom from fear), and flanked by busts of Roosevelt and Winston Churchill.
- New York City – at least four segments of the wall are located in New York City. One can be found between Gateway Plaza and the North Cove marina in the World Financial Center near the World Trade Center site. A second segment can be found in the gardens at the United Nations headquarters, among the sculptures. A third segment exists on 53rd Street between Fifth and Madison Avenues. A fourth segment was to be found at the Ripley's Believe It or Not! Museum (now closed) in Times Square. Thierry Noir and Kiddy Citny are the two painters of those five pieces of the Berlin Wall, painted in September 1985 along the Waldemarstrasse in Berlin Kreuzberg. The segment of the Berlin Wall shown at the right was originally located at Waldemarstrasse in Berlin. This graffiti among others along Waldemarstreet were well documented in 1985 through ten poster photos made by photographers Liselotte and Armin Orgel-Köhne.
- Rochester – Every Wall Falls Eventually is the name of a piece of the Berlin Wall on display in the food court area of the Bausch and Lomb Headquarters. It was installed there in 1995. This no longer resides in Rochester, NY because in 2013 Bausch and Lomb was purchased by Valeant Pharmaceuticals. The wall was given to a CEO in Switzerland as part of the business deal in August 2014.
- Stony Point – a section of the wall is located outside of the Stony Point Justice Court.
- Syracuse – a section of the wall stands behind the Milton J. Rubenstein Museum of Science and Technology in Armory Square.

Nevada

- Las Vegas – a section of the Berlin Wall is located in the Main Street Station Hotel and Casino and Brewery. Another section is in the permanent exhibition of the National Atomic Testing Museum in Las Vegas, Nevada.

North Carolina

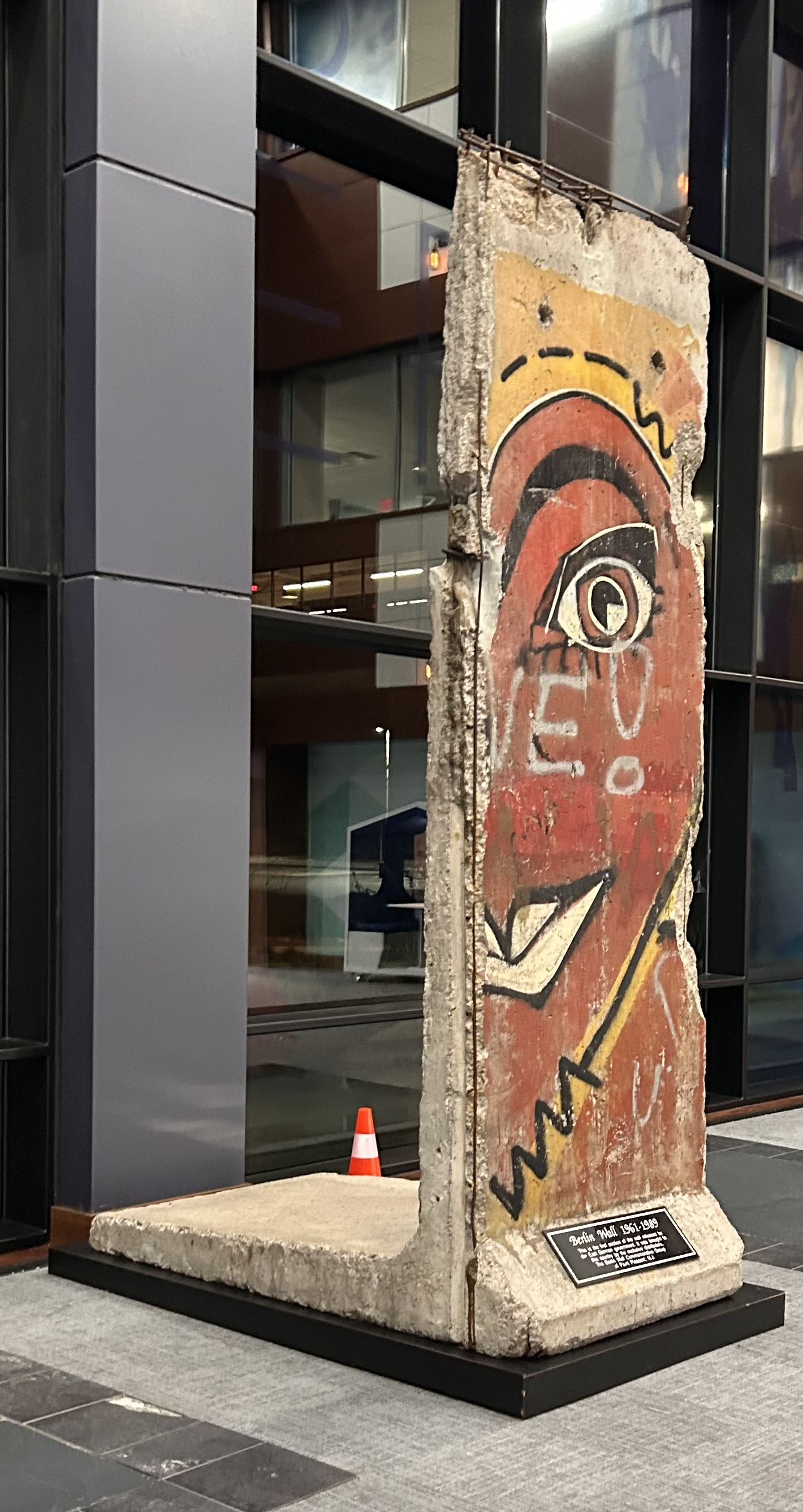

- Durham – a segment of Berlin Wall from Waldemarstrasse can be found at The Frontier in Research Triangle Park today displaying graffiti by Kiddy Citny dating from 1985, and is one of the two famous graffiti "hearts" made by this artist.

Oregon

- McMinnville, Oregon – A piece of the Berlin Wall is located inside the Evergreen Aviation & Space Museum. A piece of it reads "Adolf Honnecker" a combination of the names Adolf Hitler and Erich Honecker to criticize the German communist politician that led the German Democratic Republic.

Ohio

- Bexley – Capital University's Blackmore Library once housed the largest section of the Berlin Wall in the United States. When Blackmore Library was renovated, this section was moved outside behind Huber-Spielman Hall and sprayed with a protective layer to preserve the concrete and keep it from eroding. The segment was moved once again to its current location outside the entrance of Blackmore Library.
- Cincinnati – a section of the Berlin Wall is on display outside of the National Underground Railroad Freedom Center in downtown. This section is said to be a gift from the city of Berlin, Germany and depicts in red paint what appears to be half of a woman's face.

Pennsylvania

- Chalk Hill – two segments of the wall are on the property of the Frank Lloyd Wright-designed I.N. Hagan house. Lord Peter Palumbo, after purchasing the house in 1986, put one section of the wall in the sculpture meadow, and the other along the drive leading up to the house.
- Seven Springs – one section is at Seven Springs Resort in Pennsylvania.
- Warminster – a section of wall is on display at Vereinigung Erzgebirge, Warminster's local German-American club in 1991. It was the first segment that was sent to America after the fall of the wall and was presented in the 1990 Steuben parade in Philadelphia.

South Carolina

- Spartanburg – two segments of the Berlin Wall are located on the front lawn of a German business, Menzel Inc. They are easily seen from Interstate 85 Business.

South Dakota

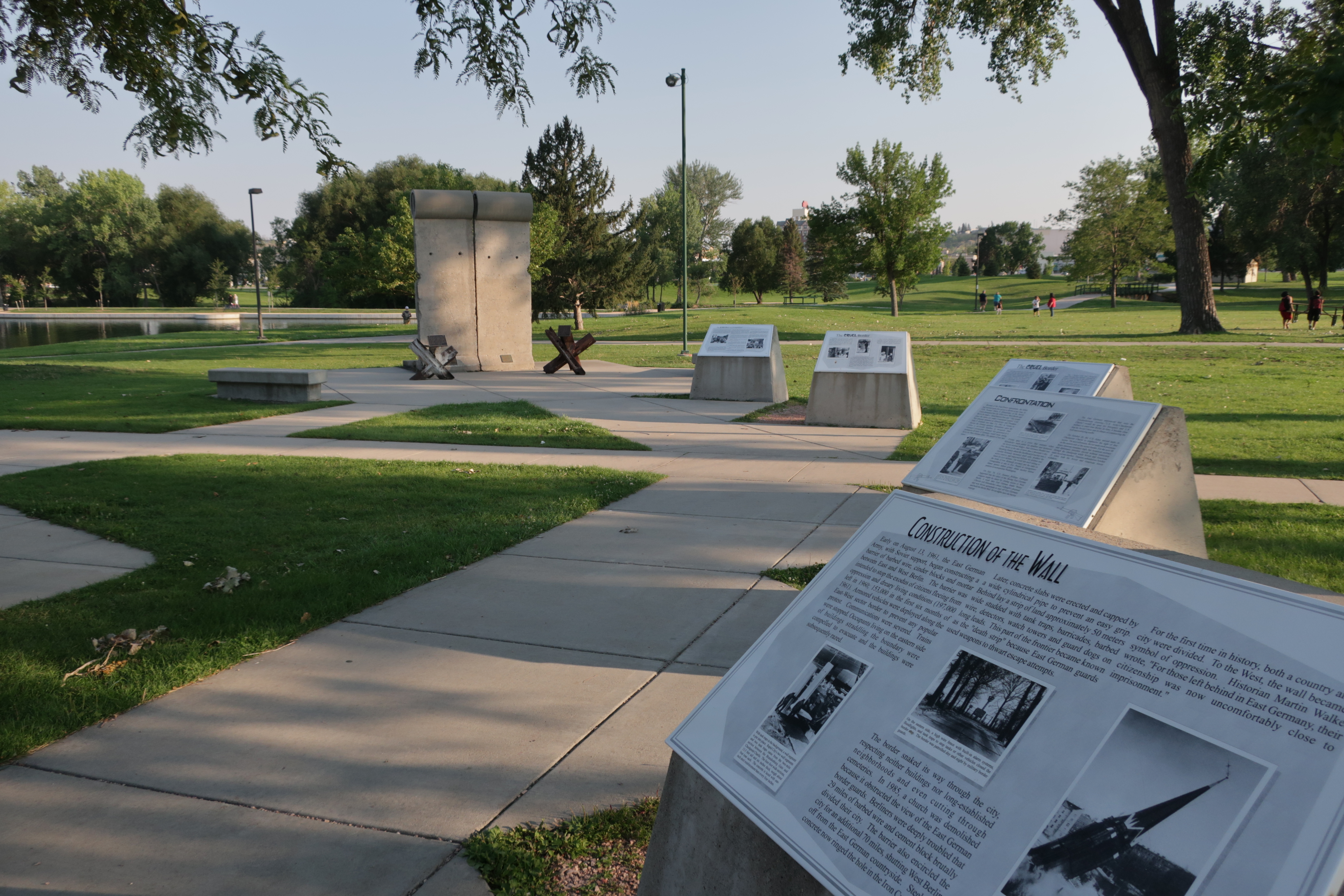
Berlin Wall Exhibit at Memorial Park in Rapid City, South Dakota

- Mount Rushmore – a small section of the wall is contained in the "Honoring Native American Veterans" exhibit in one of the visitor centers.
- Rapid City – a section of the Berlin Wall is located near the downtown area.

Texas

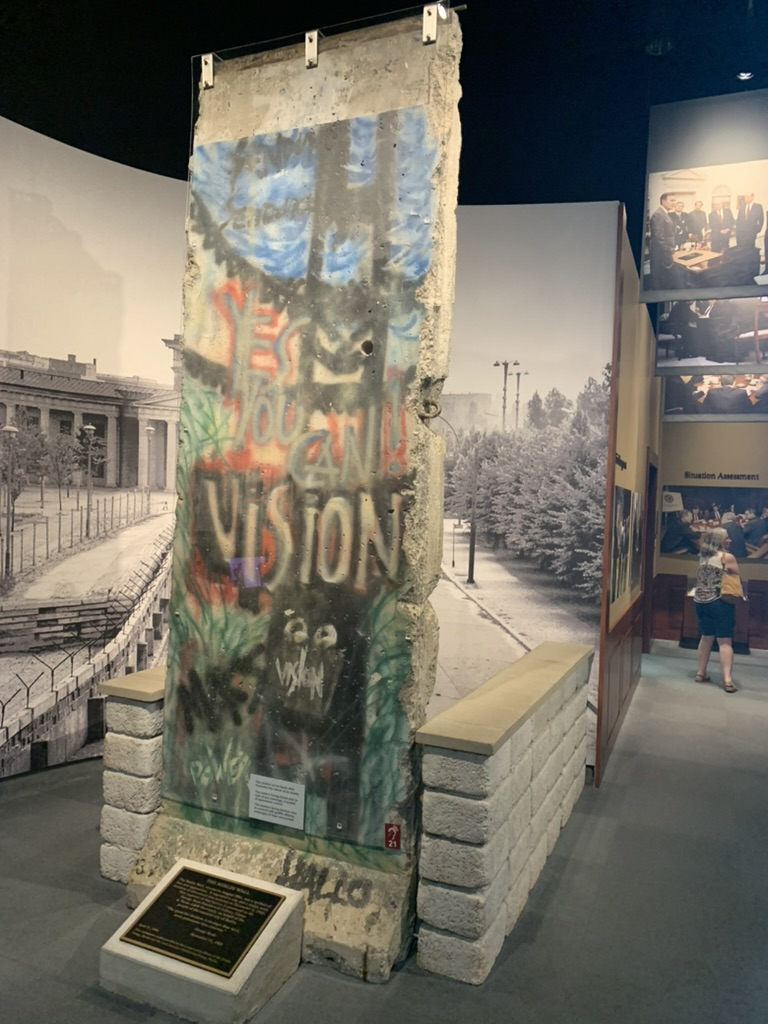
Wall segment on display inside the George Bush Presidential Library located in College Station, Texas,

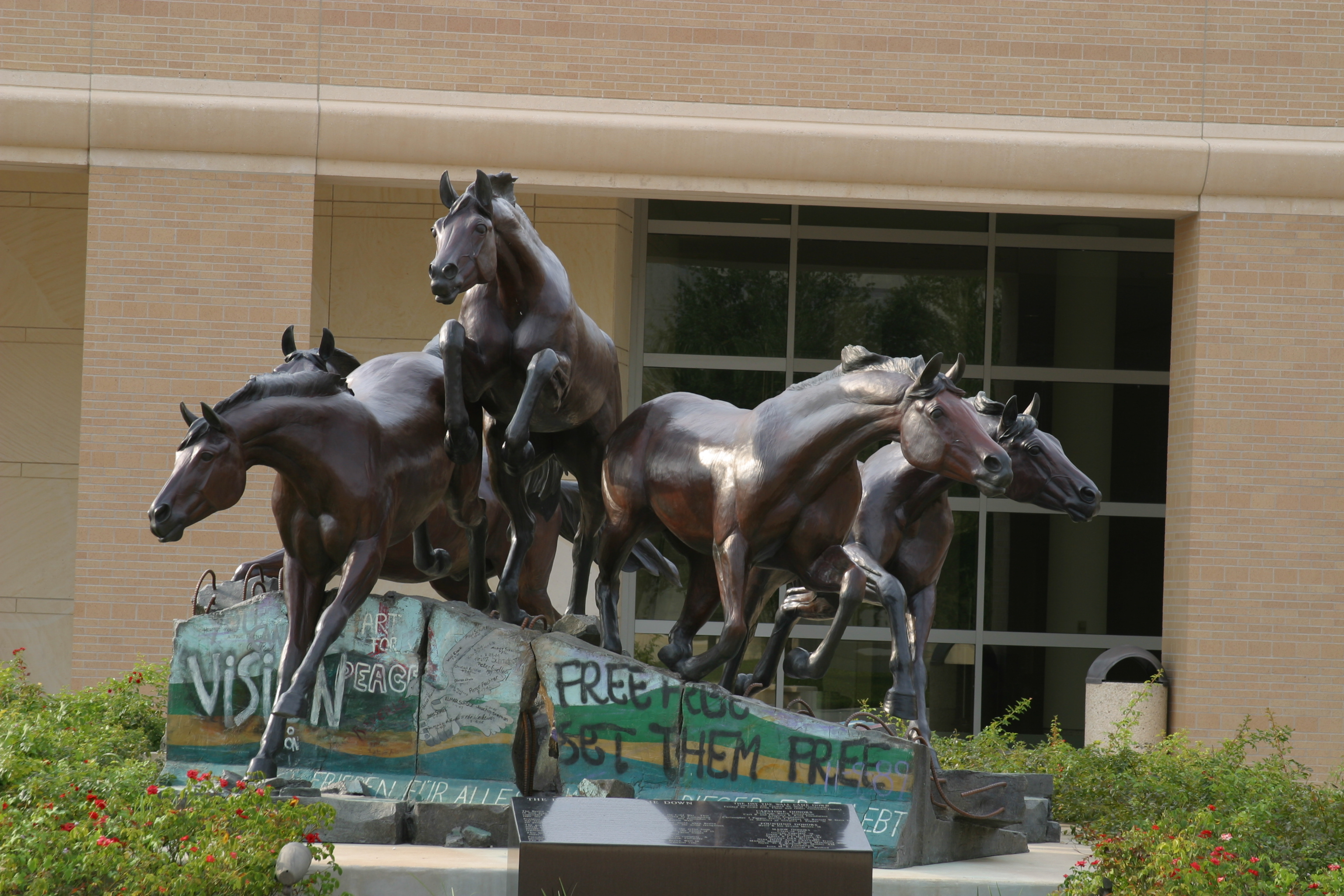
The Day the Wall Came Down (1996) by Veryl Goodnight, depicts five horses running through the rubble of the wall, exhibited at the George Bush Presidential Library in College Station, Texas

- College Station – a section of the Wall is on display inside the George Bush Presidential Library, as well as outside the museum as part of a 1997 sculpture entitled The Day the Wall Came Down, by Veryl Goodnight, which depicts five horses running through rubble of the wall. A similar 1998 sculpture, also containing pieces of the Berlin Wall, is located at the Allied Museum in Berlin. This was given as a gift from the United States to Germany.

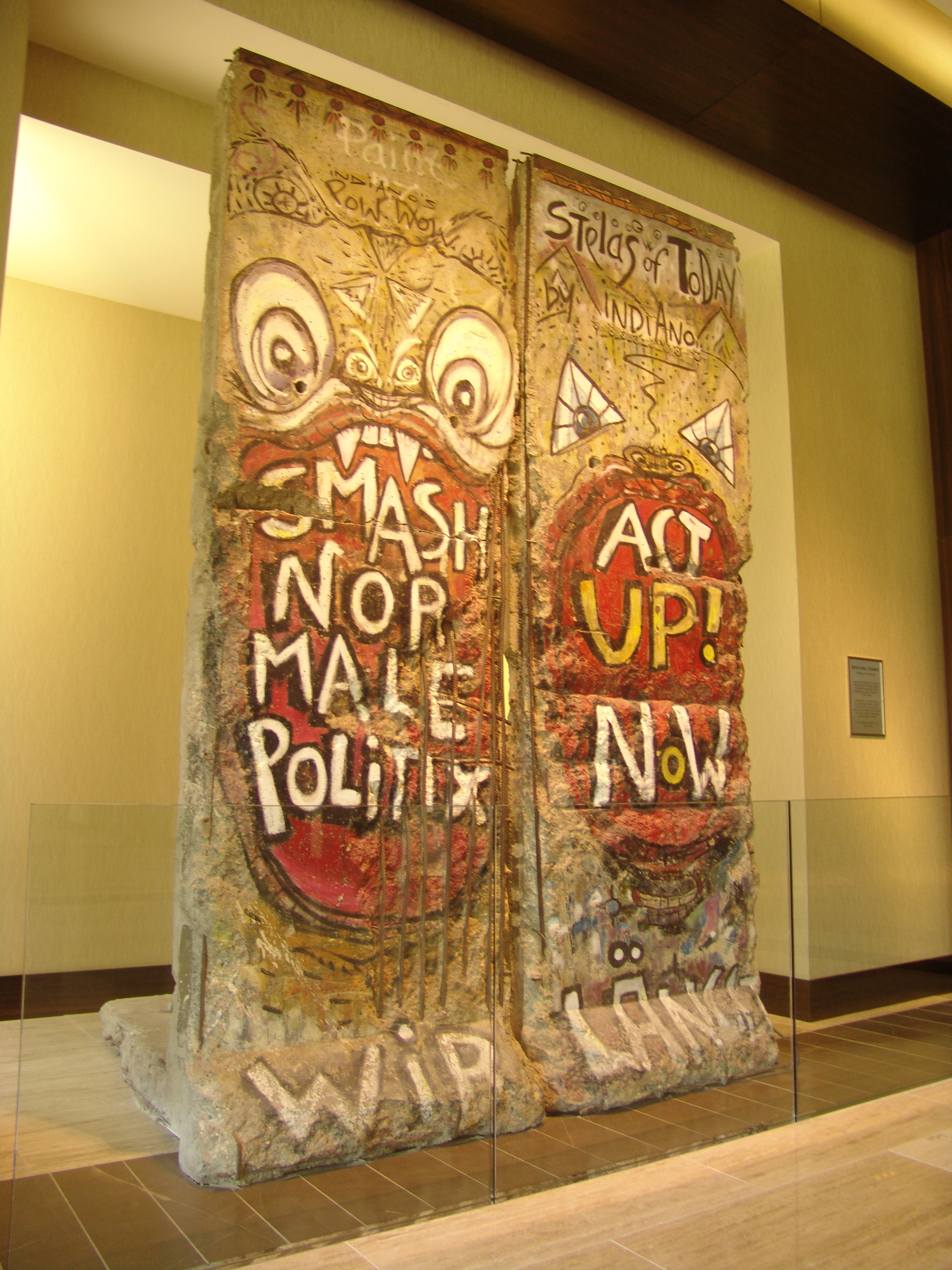
Fragments of the wall at the Dallas Hilton Anatole

- Dallas – Two segments of the wall are on display in the sculpture garden of the Hilton Anatole hotel. The two sections are each 12 feet (3.7 m) tall.
- Malakoff – A forty foot section of the wall is on display in the gated community of Long Cove, as an art installation.
- Houston – a segment of the wall is on display outside the James Baker Institute for Public Policy at Rice University in Houston, Texas. Baker was U.S. Secretary of State during the reunification of Germany.
- San Antonio – a segment is displayed at Ripley's Believe It or Not!.

Virginia

- Charlottesville – a segment of the wall is on display outside of Alderman Library at the University of Virginia.
- Newport News – a 3-meter (9.8 ft) section of the Wall is on display at the Virginia War Museum.
- Reston – a segment of the wall is on display at the Bundeswehr – German Military Liaison Office for North America in Reston, Virginia.

Washington

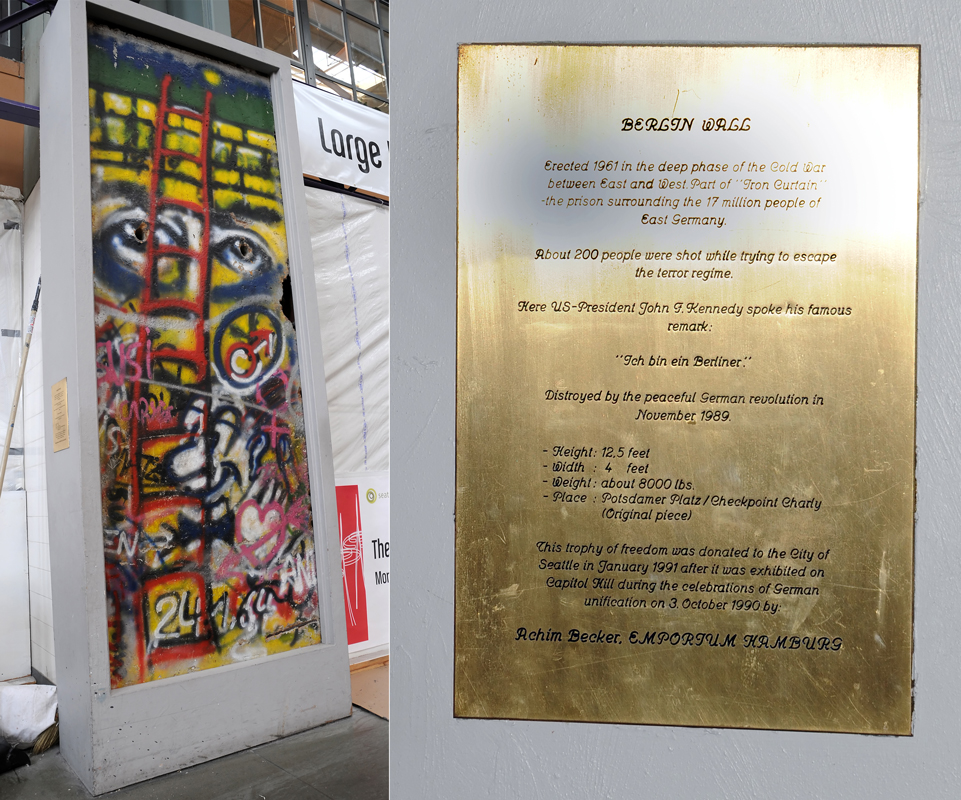
Segment at Seattle Center, Center House, Seattle

- Redmond – the Microsoft Art Collection in Redmond, Washington contains a section of the wall donated by Daimler-Benz AG.
- Seattle – a piece of the wall rests in the Center House at Seattle Center. A section of the wall is also on display on the sidewalk at North 34th Street and Troll Avenue in Fremont, at the location of the former History House of Greater Seattle.

Washington, D.C.

- Johns Hopkins University – a segment of the wall was given to the university by the Senate of Berlin in 1997. It was given to the Nitze School and the American Institute for Contemporary German Studies and stands in tribute to the success of the German-American partnership and as a symbol of the peaceful end of the Cold War. It was on display outside of the School of Advanced International Studies (SAIS) building entrance just south of Dupont Circle on Massachusetts Avenue, N.W. It has been moved to the Bloomberg Center at 555 Pennslyvania Ave, NW.
- Ronald Reagan Building and International Trade Center – a section of wall is displayed in the lobby at 1300 Pennsylvania Avenue.
- Newseum – until it closed in 2019 the largest section of the Berlin Wall outside of Germany could be found in the Newseum's Berlin Wall gallery. This had previously been displayed at Freedom Park in Rosslyn, Virginia. The exhibit included eight sections of the wall and an East German guard tower from Checkpoint Charlie.

== Central America ==
=== Guatemala ===
- Guatemala City – three fragments of the Berlin Wall are displayed at the Berlin Square, at the end of Las Américas Avenue.

=== Costa Rica ===
- San José – a fragment of the Berlin Wall is on display on the northeast side of Ministry of Foreign Affairs.

== South America ==
=== Argentina ===
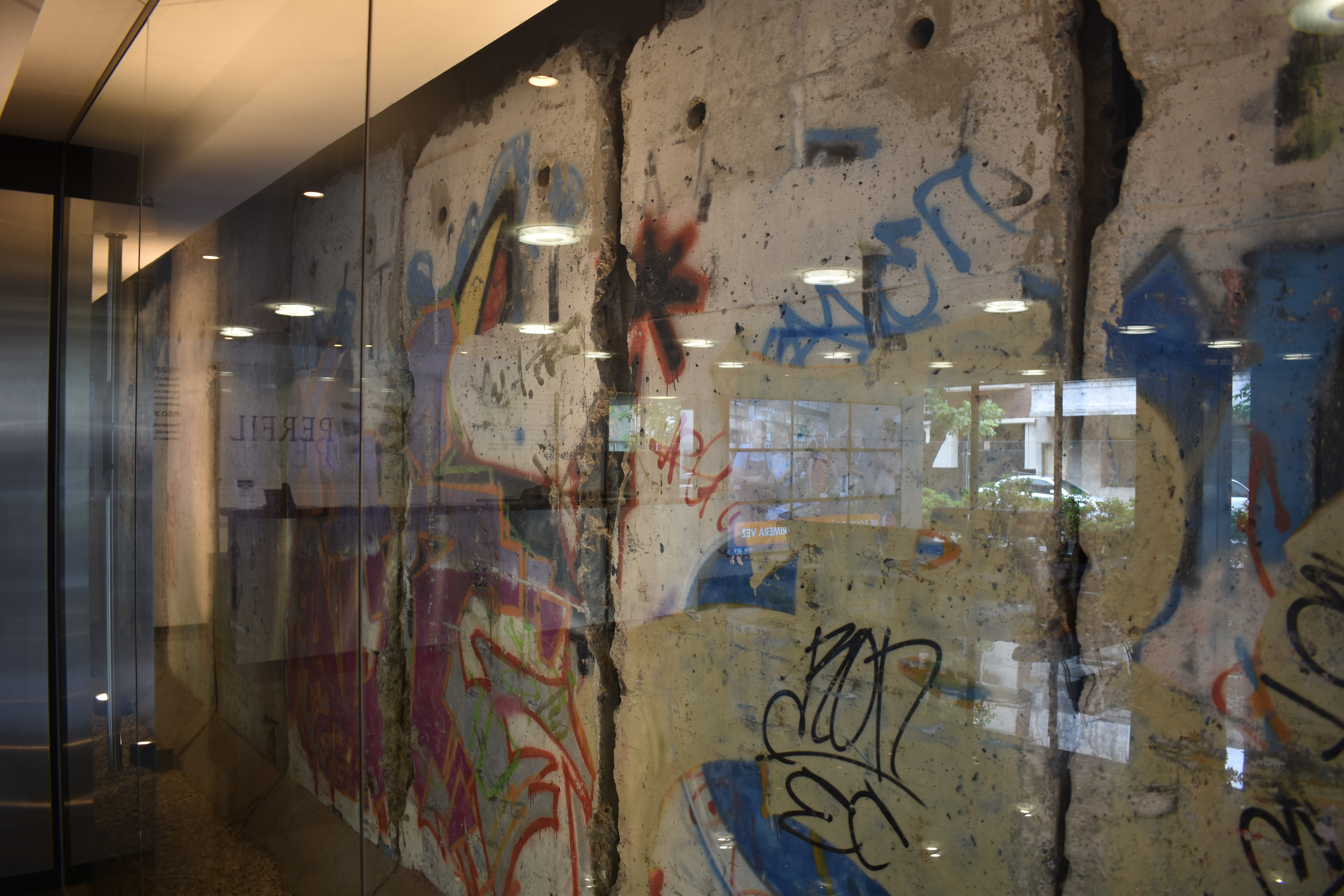
Segments at the entrance hall of Editorial Perfil.

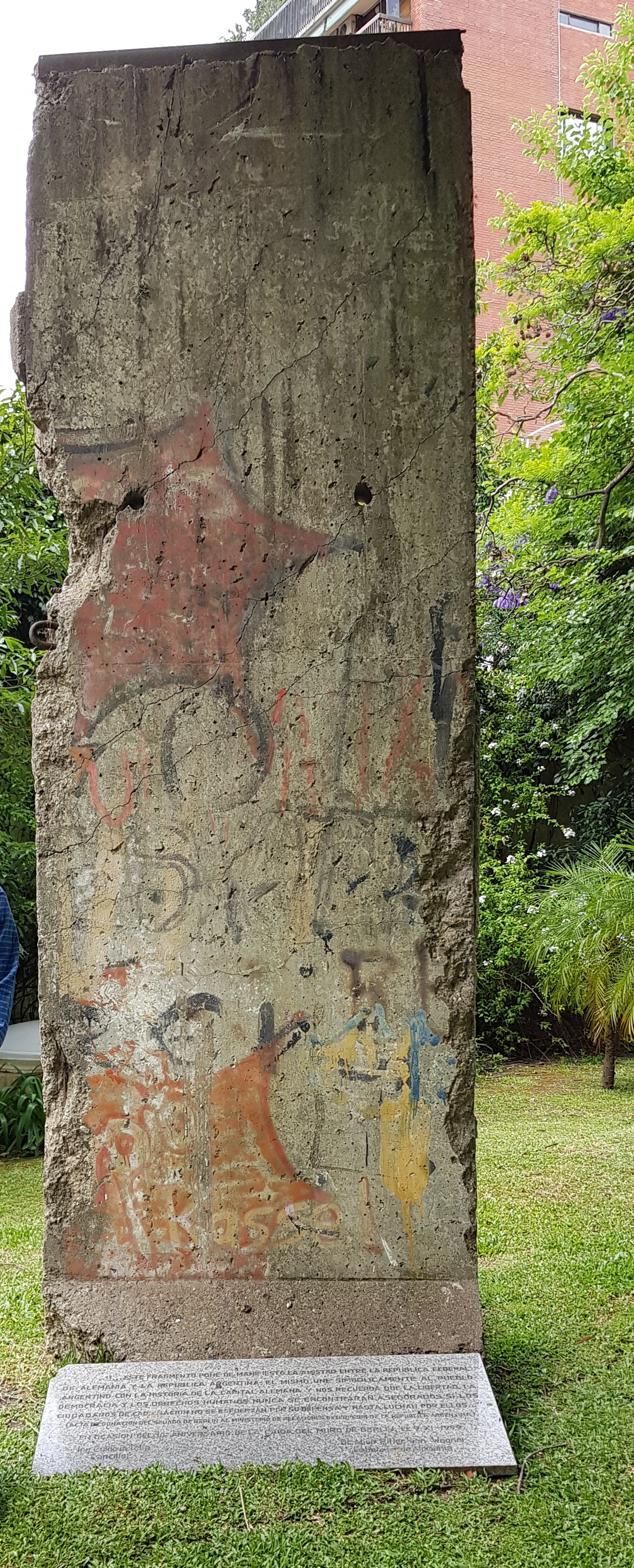
Segment at San Martin Palace.

- Buenos Aires – a segment can be found in the gardens of the San Martin Palace. It was a gift of German government to Argentina in November 1999 on the tenth anniversary of the fall of the wall. A number of segments can also be found in the lobby of the office of the Argentine newspaper Perfil. Editorial Perfil, the publishers, claims that these segments were obtained in exchange for funds to build a school in Germany.

=== Chile ===
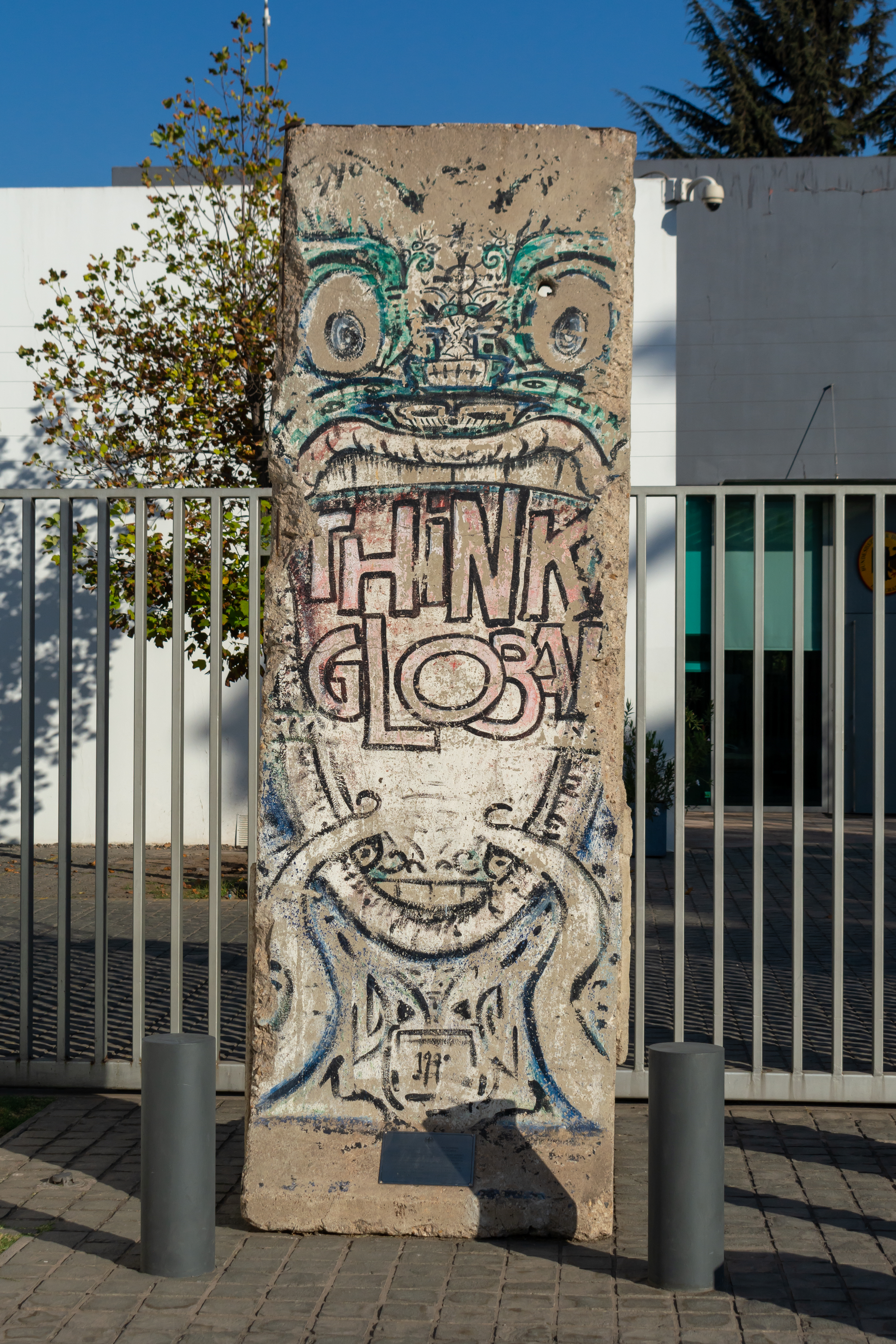
Segment at German Embassy in Santiago.

- Santiago – a segment can be found at the entrance of the German Embassy. The piece arrived at Chile in 1991, being shown at different places and in April 2012 it was definitely installed at the entrance of the embassy, at Las Hualtatas 5677, Vitacura.

=== Uruguay ===
- Nuevo Berlín - a 5 kg segment of the wall was donated to the city of Nuevo Berlín by the Uruguayan-German Chamber of Commerce in 1991.

== Unknown locations ==
Eight 4-meter-tall (13 ft) pieces of the wall, measuring ten meters in length, with the logo of the Toronto punk band Bunchofuckingoofs were put up for auction at Sotheby's in 2007 after an exhibition in Basel, Switzerland, and then New York City. Their current location is unknown.
