= Heinz Schäfer =

Former East German Stasi officer

Heinz Schäfer (born c. 1930/31) is a former East German Stasi officer who was present during at least two significant European events of the Cold War, the Berlin Crisis of 1961 and the Fall of the Berlin Wall.

== Checkpoint Charlie ==
On 27 October 1961, Soviet and US forces confronted one another at Berlin's Checkpoint Charlie, creating the potential for all-out war between the powers. Heinz Schäfer was an East German border guard at the time, and states that only by keeping calm did both sides avoid catastrophic confrontation.

== Opening of the Berlin Wall ==
9 November 1989 marked the opening of the Berlin Wall. Schäfer—at the time a Stasi colonel—claims to have been the first to open the wall, having ordered his men to deactivate the automatically triggered weapons at his Waltersdorf Chaussee/Rudow Chaussee border crossing, and then to have ordered the opening of the gate. His account places his actions hours ahead of Harald Jäger, who has long been recognized as the first East German officer to breach the wall, at the Bornholmer crossing. However, unlike Jäger's station, Schäfer's facility at Waltersdorf-Rudow was small and had no television coverage. Therefore, there is no confirming documentation of Schäfer's account. Jäger maintains that Schäfer is lying.

Schäfer came forward with these conflicting claims during a 2009 gathering of school girls. If true, his actions would explain reports of East Berliners in West Berlin hours before the opening of Jäger's Bornholmer checkpoint.

From accounts by both Schäfer and Jäger, the two made their decisions independently of one other, without orders from supervisors.
