= Gerhard Lauter =

German jurist (1950–2022)

- Born: 9 April 1950; Dresden, Saxony, German Democratic Republic
- Died: 19 September 2022; Leipzig, Saxony, Germany
- Education: KMU, Leipzig
- Occupations: Police colonel Head of the Department for Passports and Registration; Lawyer
- Known for: his role in choreographing the Fall of the Berlin Wall
- Spouse: Erika
- Children: 2
- Parent: Hans Lauter (1914–2012)

Gerhard Lauter was a former senior officer of the East German People's Police.

On 1 January 1989 Lauter started a new job, joining the Interior Ministry ("Home Office" / "Department of the Interior") as deputy head of the department responsible for the registration of citizens and for the issuance of passports and identity cards. The transfer to the ministry had come as a surprise, and the transfer away from the detective work, at which he evidently excelled, was unwelcome, but it would have been unusual (and unwise) to turn down a government job offer. Rapid promotion within the department ensued. In November of that year he played a central role in the events that led to the ending of the East German one-party dictatorship: one headline writer identified him in 2015 as "the "ghost-writer" [for the] Fall of the Berlin Wall".

== Provenance and police career ==
=== Early years: early opportunities ===
Gerhard Lauter was born in Dresden in 1950. Hans Lauter (1914–2012), his father, was a respected party official and a university lecturer in Marxism–Leninism who had spent more than nine of the twelve Hitler years in state detention, reflecting his time before 1933 as a Communist Party activist. Gerhard Lauter's grandparents, similarly, had come from "humble backgrounds" and been politically active as Communists or Socialists, thereby attracting persecution from the National Socialists. In Communist East Germany (1949–1989), it was a politically impressive pedigree.

As a school boy who longed to travel, he was thrilled by reports and documentary films about the vast Neft Daşları oil fields that had been created beneath the Caspian Sea during the 1950s (and subsequently). Permission to travel abroad was a privilege not automatically available to comrades, but Lauter had a particular aptitude for Chemistry, and he formulated a strategy to study Petrochemistry in Baku. Events took an unexpected turn, however, in around 1967, when he was invited to a meeting with the head of the security department at the Leipzig regional party leadership ("SED-Bezirksleitung") headquarters. He was informed that a career plan had already been devised for him, and it did not involve studying petrochemicals in the Soviet Union. The Ministry for State Security (Stasi) would recruit him as a counter-intelligence officer: in return he would be excused from Military service (which was normally compulsory) and would have the opportunity to study Law at the university, supported by a "Karl Marx scholarship" ("Karl-Marx-Stipendium"). Many years later, when he came to publish his autobiography in 2015, Lauter would recall his strongly positive reaction, at the age of 17, to being picked out by the party for the "honour and duty" to be a "party sword- and shield-bearer".

=== University ===
Lauter was enrolled in 1969 at the prestigious Karl Marx University (as it was known between 1953 and 1991) in Leipzig, and studied Jurisprudence. In 1971, as a third year student, he was elected a delegate to the regional conference of the FDJ (the party's stiflingly politicised youth wing), scheduled for December of that year. After he graduated the offer of a career as a Stasi officer seemed to have been withdrawn. He later speculated that this might have been because his father had fallen out of favour with the local party leadership, although there is nothing obvious in his father's own career trajectory as a university lecturer at the university to suggest any significant conflict with the party hierarchy locally or nationally. Lauter was instead assigned to legal-administrative work at the Public prosecutor's office in Bitterfeld, a short distance to the north of Leipzig.

=== People's police ===
His time in the prosecutor's office was relatively short.After a further intervention on his behalf by the regional party leadership he was appointed to a position as Task Force Group Leader (Einsatzgruppenleiter) with the People's Police in 1976.The mission assigned to him involved the creation of the "9th People's Police Company", a specialist counter-terrorist unit under the direct control of Colonel General Karl-Heinz Wagner who combined the role of a senior police officer with that of a minister at the Interior Ministry.Sources indicate that the decision of the East German government to create a specialist counter-terrorist police unit (and an equivalent decision taken at around the same time by the government in West Germany was a belated response to the terrorist massacre at the 1972 Munich Olympics. It was later suggested to Lauter that since East Germany did not face the same level of terrorist threats in the 1970s as West Germany (or Italy or Britain) it was surprising that the authorities thought it necessary to create a specialist counter-terrorist unit inside the police service. While studiously avoiding a direct response, he did not disagree. There was, however, nothing unusual about manifestations of extreme political nervousness in the East German politburo. For Gerhard Lauter, still aged just 26, his new position represented a remarkable promotion, but it nevertheless involved relocating to Berlin. There was initially no family apartment available for him in Berlin and for the time being his wife and two children remained behind in Leipzig-Rattenloch. The actual nature of his police duties is not entirely clear, although over the next few years it was in criminal police work that he excelled. In the more immediate term, one of the key duties of "9th People's Police Company" was to provide personal protection for the Soviet Police Chief and prominent Brezhnev backer, Nikolai Shchelokov. (Note: According to at least one source, Nikolai Shchelokov was not merely a backer of Leonid Brezhnev: he was a son-in-law of the Soviet leader.) The first foreign language taught in East German schools was Russian (although Lauter was proficient in a number of different languages). One duty included in the 9th Company's protection duties which has found its way into the available sources, and which Lauter undertook personally, involved accompanying Shchelokov to the Centrum-Warenhaus (main department store) and providing advice in Russian on buying kitchen curtains.

Within the police service he quickly built himself a formidable reputation as a criminal investigator, with a particular flair for the difficult cases. His caseload was not restricted to murder and manslaughter suspects, but also covered other categories that needed an exceptionally sure detective's instinct. East Germany, founded in 1949, remained under the fraternal sponsorship of the Soviet Union, which meant an ongoing trickle of cases involving Soviet army deserters, armed and desperate to avoid being recaptured and returned to the rough care of their Red Army commanders at the Soviet military bases. In reality, the re-arrest of Soviet army deserters was the only task for which he regularly invoked his small carefully trained group of "9th People's Police Company" specialist counter-terrorist officers. He was also given important responsibilities in respect the politically explosive cases of West German RAF terrorist "activist-deserters" who during the early 1980s were given new homes and meticulously constructed new identities in East Germany. (Note: There were at least twelve former RAF activist members who fled to new lives in East Germany including, in 1980, Silke Maier-Witt and, in 1982, Inge Viett.) During his career as a criminal investigator his case portfolio also included the usual quota of missing children cases. A particularly important promotion came during 1985 when, still aged only 35, Gerhard Lauter became Head of Investigation for the East German Criminal Police, following the death of Deputy Interior Minister Lt. Gen. Rudolf Riss to whom, alongside his other duties, he became, as he later recalled, a de facto personal assistant during the early 1980s. It was clear during the later 1980s that his time and energies were increasingly dominated not by detective work but by related administrative and quasi-political responsibilities straddling the important interface between the People's Police and the Interior Ministry.

== 1989 ==
=== Passport administration ===
It nevertheless came as a "biographical shock" when he was suddenly appointed vice-head of the Interior Ministry's national office for passports and citizens' registration. Despite his Law degree, he could muster no enthusiasm for running a department concerned with government administration. Nevertheless, as a government employee there was no obvious way in which he should contemplate resisting his unexpected transfer out of the police service. His new department was concerned with administering identity cards, passports and visas. Importantly, however, it was not responsible for decisions on travel permissions. Foreign travel – especially to the "Non-Socialist" countries outside the "Soviet Bloc", had become a rare privilege for East Germans following the acute labour shortages generated by the slaughter of war in the 1940s and the mass-migrations to the west of the 1950s. Especially since August 1961, the foreign travel privilege was one jealously controlled by the government through another section in the Department for Internal Affairs and through the Ministry for State Security. "If a 'no' came through from next door, there could be no approval [for travel documentation]", Lauter later explained.

The department did, however, collate and maintain the statistics on citizens leaving the country, including a subset of those seeking to visit "the west". At the start of 1989 Party General Secretary (i.e. leader of the government) Erich Honecker made a public pronouncement that the Berlin Wall would still be in place "in fifty years and indeed in a hundred years". This triggered an immediate increase in the number of people wishing to leave the country, not merely for a foreign trip, but permanently. The development came in the wider context of an intensifying surge through 1989 in anti-government streets protests. In the past government security services might have "cracked down" on citizen street protests, using whatever level of savagery was necessary, and supported as necessary by Soviet troops and tanks. That had happened in 1953. But in 1989, with the winds of Glasnost blowing across from (of all places) Moscow, and with Erich Honecker seriously unwell, the politburo became paralysed with indecision. That would create a vacuum which officials lower down in the hierarchy of power would sometimes find themselves called upon to fill. Meanwhile, Gerhard Lauter's formidable mental abilities, coupled with his work in the department that controlled the relevant statistics, made him one of the best informed people in East Germany about emigration applications and emigration figures. During the first six months of 1989 almost 22,000 East Germans applied for permission to emigrate. That compared with just 30,000 emigration applications processed during the entire twelve months if the previous year. "That was a clear signal that people were voting with their feet", in Lauter's judgement.

=== Looming emigration crisis ===
Government leaders knew the figures too – and did nothing. When Günter Mittag, a member of parliament and Party Secretary for the Economy, flew to Bonn for a meeting with West-German Chancellor Kohl (which he undertook in place of his friend Party Secretary Honecker, who was too ill to make the trip), he prepared for his meeting by asking Lauter how many private visits from East Germany to the west had been approved by the East German authorities. The figure had increased each year for a considerable period, and Mittag wanted to be able to boast about the trend to his West German interlocutors. The number had indeed increased again during the first part of 1989, but only because of an increase in the number of trips approved for retired East Germans. For East Germans of working age the quota of those permitted to travel abroad had actually declined by slightly 19.8%. "People made more applications for permission to emigrate permanently, which explained the reduction in the number of permits available for visitor trips", Lauter subsequently told an interviewer, later adding that for him there was never any question of falsifying the data. That was done by Party Secretary Honecker in person, when the sheet of paper showing the total number of visitor trips undertaken was handed to him. It showed the number of approved visitor trips to the west for the first part of 1989 to have been 390,922: he took out his pen and changed the figure to 290,922. At the same time he changed the per centage reduction from 19.8% to 9.8%. "Even the maths didn't work any more", Lauter pointed out: he never found out whether Honecker's figures were actually presented at the meeting with the West German chancellor. Over the next few months, Lauter was confronted by Honecker's arbitrary approach with increasing frequency.

=== Porous borders ===
After six month as deputy head of department, and following the retirement of Günther Fischer, on 1 July 1989 Gerhard Lautner took over the department. It was a remarkable promotion, given that he was still only 38. Reflecting the overlap between a number of government service departments and the East German military, Lauter's final service grade, which he had now reached, was "Colonel of the People's Police". By the middle of 1989 there was a widespread perception that change – possibly unwelcome and certainly uncertain – was on the horizon. The so-called Iron Curtain down the centre of Europe had become porous. For weeks more and more East Germans had been escaping to West Germany, not via the direct route (which would still have been impossible) but by taking a "vacation" through Czechoslovakia and into Hungary, from where it had become possible to cross into Austria at the point where the electric fencing between the two countries had been dismantled in May 1989. By August 1989, as lines of Trabants chugged resolutely across Czechoslovakia, Hungary and Austria to West Germany, it is thought that approximately 60,000 East Germans had made their way using this route. The crisis became personal when a postcard arrived at Lauter's home from Copacabana in Brazil. It was good to know that their daughter, who had last been seen heading towards Hungary with some friends and a tent, was alive and apparently well; but there was a more pressing challenge at home in the form of the Lauter's grandson. "We were very happy to look after the little chap [while his mother took a holiday]". But now it was entirely uncertain whether or when the child would see his mother again. The man in charge of the statistics of East Germans travelling abroad now had to add his daughter to the list. "If the decision had been down to me at that time, then we would have had complete travel freedom, if only to stabilise the situation in East Germany .... Travel freedom was one of the greatest wishes [of the ever more restive East German population]. But the German Democratic Republic was actually driving people out of the country". He could not know that less than three months later, through a series of bizarre circumstances and government mis-steps, the decision would indeed be "down to him".

=== Government paralysis ===
But before that, in August 1989, Erich Honecker decided to order a universal passport requirement. He seemed to believe that this would make it possible to stop the stream of traffic crossing the border into Czechoslovakia en route to Hungary and the west. (Czechoslovakia was significant as the only country that citizens were permitted to visit without obtaining express authorisation from the East German authorities.) From a practical point of view, Lauter was able to inform the government that approximately six million blue passports were already in circulation, and another six million unused blank passports were in stock, available for relatively rapid allocation and distribution. That would be enough for slightly above two thirds of the population. It then became evident that Honecker was insisting on completely new red passports: there could be no possibility of using the existing blue ones. Lauter arranged for the rapid production of 18 sample passports. But producing sixteen million quickly enough to be used for whatever it was Honecker might be planning in respect of the Czechoslovak border crossings was simply impossible. It is not clear whether or how far Lauter confronted government with the practicalities of the situation. "We simply 'boycotted' this irrational demand", he would later acknowledge. Nobody asked about it any more. "These old men were hopelessly overwhelmed. I believe that after a couple of days they no longer knew what they had decided [about passports]". The ones who needed to take decisions had become incapable of doing so: they had allowed themselves to become overwhelmed by events. "That meant that the operational effectiveness of the country's administrative apparatus, of which I was a part, was seriously constrained."

During September a rumour took off that East Germany was about to close its frontier with Czechoslovakia. The flow of refugees was increasing. The destination of many was the West German embassy in Prague. Their objective was not a two-week trip to West Germany to meet up with relatives, but permanent emigration, for which they needed to obtain paperwork from the embassy. When the gates to the compound were closed they simply claimed over the wall. By the end of September an estimated 4,000 East Germans (Note: Estimates vary.) were camping in the embassy grounds, causing "serious problems of supply and hygiene". The West German government made furious and urgent attempts to negotiate with the East German government to find a solution. On 30 September 1989 the West German Foreign Minister, Hans-Dietrich Genscher, personally visited the Prague embassy in order to deliver to the East Germans camped in the embassy grounds the outcome of those negotiations. Party General Secretary Honecker had taken another decision, apparently without involving politburo comrades. The people would be allowed out. But the trains taking them would not travel directly from Prague to West Germany via the border at Passau. Instead the campers would take the train from Prague back to East Germany, and would then be permitted to cross into West Germany to East Germany. "Sovereignty" must be respected. When Genscher reached this part of his announcement in his speech in the embassy gardens it is not clear how many heard him, since the angry calls from those standing closest to him drowned out his words. Lauter's assessment, shared in a subsequent interview, was that this was "a completely absurd [stipulation]". Interior Ministry officials would have to join the already badly overcrowded trains between Dresden and Hof min order to stamp the passports of the would-be emigrants in order to "release them from East German citizenship" (as the matter was officially expressed).

A few days later, on 3 October, Lauter heard on the news that the border between East Germany and Czechoslovakia had been closed to comrades. Thousands of East Germans were now trapped in Czechoslovakia. Secretary Honecker had taken another of his quick decisions. The passport office was deluged with 'phone calls from regional party secretaries seeking clarification on the situation. Lauter was unable to provide any. From his comrades in Interior Ministry, who seem to have been surprised by the news reports as he had been, came the suggestion that he should "create exceptions" in order to construct a way round "the decision". "Czechoslovakia was a preferred holiday destination. Summer holidays had been booked and hotels prepaid ... at the least, people ought to be allowed to go there". Within a few days thirteen classes of exception had been devised "... which in practical terms meant that the previous situation [with the border] had been restored".

=== Régime change? ===
Erich Honecker, sick and bewildered, was deposed by politburo comrades on 18 October 1989. The next day Egon Krenz, the new man in charge, instructed Gerhard Lauter to draft a new Travel Law. The only guidance from Krenz was that anyone wishing to leave the country permanently should be permitted to do so immediately. For visitor trips abroad, Lauter should be able to come up with something. (Note: "Für Besuchsreisen sollte ich mir etwas einfallen lassen".) Lauter pulled together a working group that included comrades from the Interior Ministry, the Foreign Ministry, the Defence Ministry, the Ministry for National Security (Stasi), the Finance Ministry, the Transport Ministry and the Justice Ministry. Lauter, who seems to have taken a leading role within the group, would later recall that their discussions were often heated: "and yet we never noticed how much we were falling back into our traditional workplace roles. .... Free Travel would mean that citizens would no longer have to ask the government for permission [to travel abroad] and the government would no longer be able to block trips". The group also talked about money. Hitherto the system in place had meant that a comrade obtaining permission to travel to the west was also permitted to exchange fifteen East German marks into West German marks at the artificially favourable rate of 1:1, regardless of the intended duration of their trip. But the group member from the Finance Ministry reported that even if the amount per visit remained at the (by now rather low) level of 15 marks, the government could not afford to continue the arrangement once everyone was permitted to visit the west. In the end the group came up with a draft Travel Law which stated that every East German citizen should be entitled to travel abroad for up to one month in any one year, but there would be no particular entitlement in respect of foreign currency, and the entitlement was subject to the citizen being in possession of a current passport containing an appropriate visa. The government was to approve and issue visas within thirty days.

Under the uncertain circumstances of the times, Lauter took the precaution of having the draft law signed off personally by all the ministers with responsibility for the affected government departments. Unexpectedly it was Erich Mielke the man in charge of the feared Ministry for State Security, whose signature was the easiest to obtain: "So you're Lauter? Way young, huh?". (Note: „Du bist der Lauter? Janz schön jung, wa?“ (Mielke lapsed into Berlin dialect which made the conversation memorable.))And he signed immediately. The hardest ministerial signature to obtain was that of Willi Stoph, who had chaired the Council of Ministers since 1964. He was disturbed by the inclusion in the draft law of the term "Rechtsmittelbelehrung", belatedly displaying a hitherto unsuspected interest in citizens' rights in the event of a government refusal to issue travel visas timely. However, Stoph agreed to sign off the draft law once the term "Rechtsmittelbelehrung" had been replaced with the arguably less prescriptive term "Rechtsmittelinformation".

=== Intensifying public pressure ===
The draft law was published on Monday 6 November. That evening Gerhard Lauter was invited to appear on a television talk show in order to explain it. Also featuring on the talk show was Gregor Gysi, "a small bald lawyer from Berlin with round John Lennon glasses", who at that time was also emerging as a high-profile Gorbachev fan and advocate of political reform. Gysi and Lauter already knew one another from the time when Lauter had been a top criminal investigator and Gysi had been chairman of the Lawyers' Association in East Berlin. Gysi used the television show to deliver his verdict that the draft law was completely inadequate, and displayed his lawyerly sense of drama by tearing up the draft legislation before the cameras. Lauter became more convinced than ever that he had been sent out to defend something completely hopeless.

The next day mountains of letters deluged Lauter's office. Students, pensioners and experts and even entire worker collectives all had opinions to share with the head of the passport office. Most rejected the draft Travel Law. Many added suggestions of their own. Lauter set up a working group within the office to handle the correspondence, which in the end exceeded 60,000 items of mail. "Long after the wall came down, we were still getting letters about it". It was soon clear that Lauter's television appearance had not only resonated adversely with the general public. The parliamentary Justice Committee also began a flirtation with insurrection. It was already common for commentators – especially western commentators – to dismiss the East German parliament (Volkskammer) as a mere "rubber stamp parliament", but by November it had become clear that 1989 was to be a year like no other for the country. but by November it had become obvious that for East Germany there was little that was "normal" about 1989. The parliamentary Justice Committee determined on 7 November 1989 that the draft Travel Law was "not enough" and sent it back. Pressure mounted further. News came through that the Czechoslovak government were threatening to reclose the Czech frontier with East Germany, this time from the Czech side. The border crossings had only been re-opened from the East German side at the beginning of November: "refugees" from East Germany were again flooding across and heading for the West German embassy in Prague. On 8 November 1989, acknowledging that the draft Travel Law was unsatisfactory and aware of the urgency of the position, but unsure how to find a permanent solution to the travel issue, a frightened politburo called for an interim solution. That same day the entire politburo submitted their resignation. Importantly, they had only requested an interim solution on the travel issues in respect of citizens wishing to emigrate permanently: they saw no commensurate urgency in respect of the situation facing citizens wishing to take a two-week vacation abroad. Friedrich Dickel, the Interior Minister, immediately issued the necessary order, and Gerhard Lauter found himself mandated to draft up the proposal. This time there was no time for a "working group" solution. They asked that Lauter's proposal should be handed over to them the next day.

=== The Travel Law: "interim solution" draft ===
On the morning of 9 November 1989 Gerhard Lauter sat in his office with Gotthard Hubrich, the head of the department for domestic affairs (a subdivision of the Interior Ministry) and Colonels Krüger and Lemme from the Ministry for State Security. The Stasi colonels had taken the precaution of bringing their own draft of Lauter's proposal with them. It was engagingly simple, stating in effect that citizens wishing to emigrate permanently could do so without precondition and with immediate effect. Lauter was still feeling bruised by the reception that his own draft for a permanent solution had received in the media and from the government. He became exasperated and attempted to explain to the colonels the problem with their draft: "That is not how it works ... Anyone wanting to emigrate permanently can just get in the car and drive. Yet if someone just wants to visit an aunt in West Germany or see the Eiffel Tower, and then come home again, should they still not be permitted to do that? This is how we will drive people out of the country more than ever!" (Note: „Das geht so nicht ... Wer für immer weg will, kann fahren, und wer nur mal seine Tante besuchen oder den Eiffelturm sehen und wiederkommen will, soll das immer noch nicht dürfen? Damit treiben wir die Leute erst recht aus dem Land!“) Lauter was not at all certain that any of the other participants in the ad hoc meeting understood either the issues or the text he had been mandated to prepare. He himself, following discussion with senior passport office colleagues, had already concluded that it would be absurd to try and draft a policy that purported to deal only with permanent emigration, without making any provision for comrade-citizens who still wished to live in East Germany, but nevertheless wished to be allowed to undertake trips abroad.

Lauter was more convinced than ever of the need for all citizens to be permitted to travel abroad without restriction, just as they were in West Germany. Among the "socialist" states that had lived under Soviet sponsorship for more than forty years, in 1988, the Socialist Hungarian government started making it easier for its own citizens to travel to the west, liberalising the process further during 1989. Although Lauter's preference fell far outside the guidelines of the mandate he had received from the politburo via Interior Minister Dickel, he was able to win round the others attending the meeting in his office on the morning of 9 November. During or immediately after the meeting he had three extra sentences added to the "draft interim proposal", as follows: "Applications can be made for private trips abroad without the requirement to provide the [hitherto necessary] justifications (reasons for travel and family relationships). Permits will be granted without delay. Reasons for the refusal of applications will be applied only in exceptional cases." (Note: "Privatreisen nach dem Ausland können ohne Vorliegen von Voraussetzungen (Reiseanlässe und Verwandtschaftsverhältnisse) beantragt werden. Die Genehmigungen werden kurzfristig erteilt. Versagungsgründe werden nur in besonderen Ausnahmefällen angewandt.") As well as a draft interim travel law, the four men drew up an accompanying proposal for a press release, to be embargoed till 16.00 on 10 November 1989, when it was envisaged the new arrangements would be formally announced. By that time there would have been a chance to make sure that policemen on border duty had been appropriately briefed.

The draft was to apply until a permanent Travel Law could be passed, and would be published at 16.00 in Friday 10 November 1989. The authorities were to be ready to accept and process visa applications with effect from that moment. At around lunchtime he draft was taken to the large Central Committee building in Werderscher Markt where the Party Central Committee, to which most government ministers belonged, had already been discussing "management matters" and the country's impending economic collapse for hours. Shortly after lunch Egon Krenz announced a smoking break and disappeared with a dozen senior central committee members into the adjacent office. He read out Lauter's proposed draft interim Travel Law. There were no objections. At 15.30, after an unusually long smoking break, the main meeting resumed and passed the draft without dissent before returning to the prepared agenda. All 44 of East Germany's government ministers had now "agreed" Lauter's text, though the risk remained that someone might take a closer look ahead of the public announcement later that day, and ministerial consent might yet be revoked. Minister Dickel telephoned Lauter during the afternoon to confirm curtly that "his matter" had thereby been decided. (Note: »Deine Sache ist so beschlossen. Ende.«) Lauter now embarked on a frantic telexing operation to prepare the police registration offices round the country for the administrative processes that were to be announced later that day. Even at this stage, it never occurred to Gerhard Lauter that by the end of the day there would apparently be no one left in East Germany who saw the point of obtaining official permission - however perfunctory - before crossing the border into West Germany.

It remains unclear whether any of the central committee members, even Krenz, had understood the interim Travel Law to which they had assented. Egon Krenz may have felt he had more important concerns. On the evening of 31 October 1989 he had set off for a trip to Moscow and an urgent meeting with Mikhail Gorbachev. The meeting had been explosive on several levels. Krenz had been obliged to ask for increased financial support, while informing the Soviet leader that East Germany had been "living beyond it means" since the early 1970s: without continued financial support Krenz was advised that East Germany faced an overnight 30% drop in living standards. The country was bankrupt, with a snowballing government deficit. Gorbachev had been visibly shocked by the extent of the problem. He was supportive, but admitted he could do little economically: he could, however, support Krenz in obtaining help "from the west", despite the obvious risk that elements in the west might use increased financial help as a bargaining chip in pressing for future German reunification, which was already featuring in one or two "behind the scenes" political rumour mills. It was important, Gorbachev coolly pointed out, to continue the "flexible in principle" approach to relations with West Germany. Abruptly changing the subject, the Soviet leader observed that time was ripe for finding a satisfactory "formula" to resolve the Travel and Refugee problem which, he said, was now featuring prominently on the West German political agenda. Krenz was able to provide hasty reassurance that the matter was in hand, and outlined the new Travel Law being drafted by Lauter's working group (which would be ridilculed on East German television and rejected by the East German parliament a few days later). The Soviet Party Secretary did not, at that meeting, bother to spell out the extent of the discussions about future east–west rapprochement that he had already held with Chancellor Helmut Kohl during lengthy "walks in the woods" behind Deidesheim, near Kohl's Oggersheim home. Nor did he mention that he was already in contact with Hans Modrow (who later emerged as East German president in succession to Egon Krenz). Nevertheless, by the time the East German Party Central Committee signed off on Lauter's draft on 9 November 1989, it is likely that Krenz was aware on some level that the Kremlin viewed him merely as "an interim figure". When Lauter's draft was handed to Central Committee comrades by Krenz, it appeared under the title, "To change the situation concerning East German citizens seeking permanent emigration to West Germany through Czechoslovakia it is established that:" (Note: "Zur Veränderung der Situation der ständigen Ausreise von DDR-Bürgern nach der BRD über die ČSSR wird festgelegt:") which was a less than complete summary of the accompanying draft document itself. Probably Central Committee members assumed that the draft concerned only permanent emigration, and never took the opportunity to familiarise themselves with, in particular, the final three sentences concerning short trips abroad.

Despite feeling exhausted and unwell, Lauter remained in his office for the rest of the day in case the politburo assent to the draft interim Travel Law might yet be revoked. By 19.00 it had not been, so he packed his papers into his case and headed off in his Wartburg. His wife had bought theatre tickets for an evening show at the Palace of the Republic. Eberhard Esche was giving a performance of The Story of Reynard the Fox, Goethe's twelve part set of scathing insights of life at the royal court.

=== Theatre ===
As Lauter settled down with his wife to enjoy a Goethe night at the theatre, his draft interim Travel Law was about to take centre stage at the International Press Centre.

Günter Schabowski had not returned to the Central Committee meeting with the others after the extended cigarette break. He joined the meeting only at 17.00, and then did not stay for very long. The first secretary of the District Party leadership for Berlin had recently acquired a supplementary post as a government press spokesman and had to prepare for an important press conference. If any further discussion of Lauter's paper had taken place between Central Committee members that afternoon, formally or in the corridor, it is likely that Schabowski would have missed it. Shortly before 18.00 Schabowski arrived at the Press Centre in his chauffeur-driven Volvo, entering the crowded hall at 17.54 with a fat folder of papers under one arm. Before he left for the press conference Egon Krenz had passed him a copy of Lauter's draft press statement. Sources differ over what Krenz said as he handed over the paper, but apart from stressing its importance he evidently provided only, at most, a very brief explanation of it. As the press conference opened, everything seemed eerily normal. A number of East German journalists dutifully asked about that morning's Central Committee meeting and received routinely bland answers. A frustrated West German journalist, Peter Brinkmann, asked when the East German government would finally abolish press censorship and received a predictably meaningless reply. One of the last journalists to arrive had been the Italian Riccardo Ehrman. Ehrmann had known Schabowski personally for many years: unable to find a spare seat, Ehrman perched on the edge of the podium from which Schabowski was addressing an audience of bored journalists. Sources speculate that Ehrmann had been late because he had been on the telephone, receiving a last minute tip-off from someone who had been present at that day's Central Committee meeting. At 18.53 he took his turn at the journalists' microphone and tried a direct question: "Mr. Schabowski, you have spoken of mistakes. Do you believe that the draft Travel Law which you presented a few days ago was a major mistake?"

Schabowski's reaction to the question quickly triggered conspiracy theories among the assembled pressmen. He appeared to have been caught off guard by the question, but there would those who wrote up his reaction as an implausibly theatrical pretence. Suddenly (he later recalled) he remembered the exchange with the leader a couple of hours earlier when Egon Krenz had passed him that important piece of paper: "...it flashed through me like a lightning bolt. My God I wanted to and still needed to provide information on this point". He took a deep breath and began to waffle, using what one reporter thought sounded like "endlessly nested sentences of Chinese partyspeak". His delivery became ever less focused as he rummaged through the papers on the desk in front of him and failed to find whatever it was he was looking for. According to the same reporter, this lasted for seven minutes. Eventually a comrade from the party rushed to help and managed to produce a copy of the press release on the interim Travel Law which Lauter had drafted that morning. Schabowski took another deep breath, put on his reading glasses, and began to read the document to the assembled reporters. Evidently it was the first time he had seen it. As he read on, there was intensifying restlessness among his audience as they slowly understood the significance of what they were hearing. Under the pressure of the moment, Schabowski left out the final section of the press release in which Lauter had thoughtfully stipulated that the Travel Law should come into force at 04.00 the next morning. Brinkmann filled the silence with a critical question: "You only said West Germany: does this also include West Berlin?" It seemed that the import of what he had just announced was beginning to dawn on Schabowski, and he tried to ignore the question. Brinkmann pressed the point and Schabowski sought an answer from the papers on his desk but failed to find one. Based on what he thought he knew, he extemporised: "Yes, yes: those wishing to emigrate permanently can cross any of the crossing points from East Germany into West Germany or West Berlin". Peter Brinkmann left the press conference to use a telephone: he had his headline.

Manfred Banaschak, editor-in-chief of the party's monthly political magazine "Einheit", had entered at the start of the press conference as part of the retinue of party officials accompanying Schabowski. He was the one who now remembered to ask when the new arrangements would come into force. Schabowski scratched his head, became even more flustered and waffled "I was told that ... this information had already been distributed. It really should be in your possession already". He consulted his papers again. When pressed Schabowski blustered on, more consequentially than ever: "it comes in, as far as I know ... is immediate ... at once". (Note: "Das tritt nach meiner Kenntnis ... ist das sofort ... unverzüglich".) He looked for reassurance at comrades sitting alongside him on the stage. The microphones did not pick up their muttered responses which, according to a journalist who was sitting in the front row, varied. Schabowski's glaring uncertainty on the timelines was on display to television viewers of the press conference, but by 19.30, when the news reader Angelika Unterlauf read out the new regulation with the same emotionless face that she used for every Central Committee announcement, it had, for the most part been edited out of television news reports. As the evening wore on the news was picked up beyond the "internal border" with West Germany: East Germans were accustomed to having to "interpret" East German television news reports, which were sometimes unfathomable, but once the respected Hanns Joachim Friedrichs had reported the Fall of the Berlin Wall from the studios in Cologne, those reports gained credibility and the numbers surging joyously between the two halves of Berlin increased. Many viewers who had been watching the press conference itself had in any case kept hold of the Schabowski's use of the word "immediate".

=== After the theatre ===
Gerhard Lauter could have followed the start of Schabowski's press conference before leaving for the theatre, but he had not done so. After he left the theatre he might have passed close to The Wall and picked up that something was going on at the border crossings, but his route home did not take him that way. The Lauters returned home at around 22.00. Their son greeted them: "It's going mad here, your minister keeps telephoning .... incidentally, the wall's open". (Note: "Hier war der Teufel los, dein Minister hat ständig angerufen ... Ach übrigens, die Mauer ist offen.")

All the telephones in the office, to which he now returned. incorporated lights which flashed when someone was trying to get through. They were all flashing. District party offices were calling to find out what the new rules meant. The US embassy also 'phoned repeatedly, trying to find out from Lauter what had actually been decided. Even the East German government kept calling, keen to know just what had been determined. Lauter triggered the emergency procedure and summoned all his department officials back to the ministry. They worked the telephones through the night. The next morning, shattered by the developments of the previous 24 hours, Lauter was back on television, explaining the new rules.

And then it was over. Looking back a quarter of century later Lauter expressed his huge relief that during that night no border guard obeyed his standing order to shoot anyone crossing the border without the proper paperwork. Confusion among their commanders and the lack of any clear orders could very easily have had tragic consequences: "Colleagues on the border acted very courageously and prudently .... I admire them for that".

== Later years ==
The entire Party Central Committee resigned on 3 December 1989, meaning that the resignation offers submitted the previous month by its inner politburo members also became effective. An extraordinary (two part) Party Congress was held on 8/9 December and 16/17 December 1989 at which the Socialist Unity Party rebranded itself as the Party of Democratic Socialism (PDS) and began the lengthy preparations for a more democratic future. Gerd Lauter was elected a member of the party's newly constituted so-called "Arbitration Commission" ("Schiedskommission"), mandated to investigate the misdeeds of the old politburo. One of his first pieces of investigation involved forcing open a very large very heavy trunk. Gold and coins fell out. Lauter would later recall his shock over the nature and scale of sheer old-fashioned corruption in the higher echelons of the old ruling party that the commission uncovered. In a secret ballot, commission members voted to exclude from the relaunched rebranded PDS almost all those who had been leading members of the Socialist Unity Party before November 1989, including Günter Schabowski.

Gerhard Lauter remained at the Interior Ministry throughout the final months of the German Democratic Republic. He was offered a job with the Interior Ministry after reunification and carefully considered the possibility, but in the end turned the offer down. Instead, like thousands of others who had grown up and built their careers in the German Democratic Republic, he found himself "on the labour market". After working his way through endless job application he ended up in a consultancy position, working for a small airline. After the airline collapsed he moved back to Leipzig with his wife. Together they set up "Kanzlei Lauter & Lauter", a law firm specialising in labour and social law. Due to his deteriorating eyesight he was obliged to resign from the firm in 2012. In 2009 he was reported to be still active on the Leipzig city council and as a member of Die Linke, the current successor party to the old East German Socialist Unity Party.

The first edition of Gerhard Lauter's book, "Chefermittler: Der oberste Fahnder der K in der DDR berichtet", an autobiographical work recalling the momentous events of 1989, appeared in 2012.
