= Harald Jäger =

Stasi officer who opened Berlin Wall

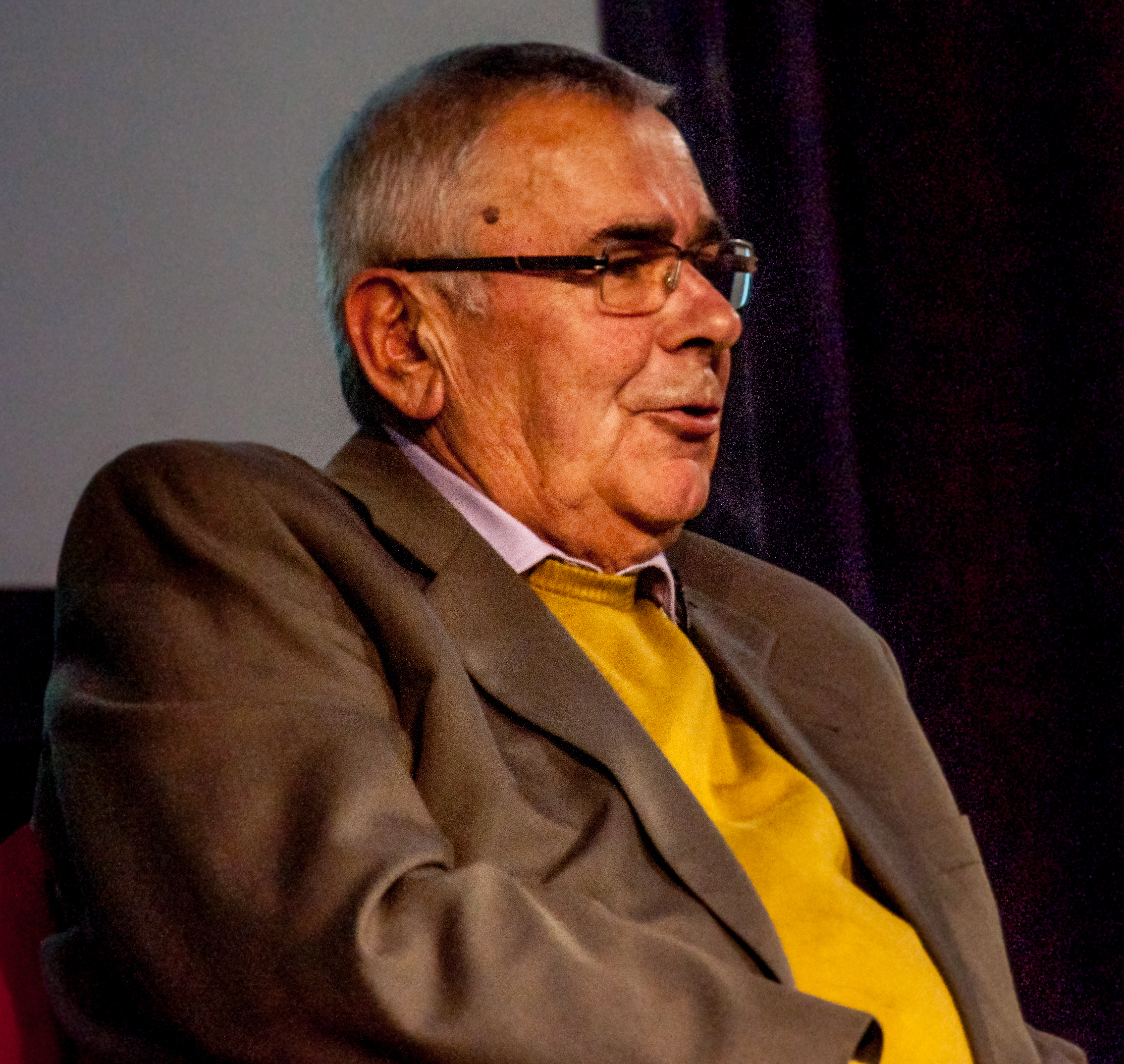
- Born: 27 April 1945 (age 81); Bautzen, Nazi Germany
- Education: University of the Ministry of State Security, Potsdam
- Known for: Opening the Bornholmer Straße border crossing of the Berlin Wall on 9 November 1989
- Notable work: The Man Who Opened the Berlin Wall
- Police career
- Allegiance: East Germany
- Department: Stasi; Border Troops
- Branch: Passport Control
- Service years: 1961-1989
- Status: Retired
- Rank: Major (1982)
- Other work: Newspaper shop owner

Harald Jäger (born 27 April 1943) is a former East German Stasi officer and border guard who was in charge of a passport control unit. On 9 November 1989, he opened the Bornholmer Straße border crossing of the Berlin Wall, under pressure from a large crowd of protesters and without orders to do so.

== Early life and education ==
Jäger grew up in Bautzen, and was educated in the manufacture of stoves. In 1961, he volunteered with the border police (who later became troops of the Nationale Volksarmee). Three years later, he entered service with the Stasi.

Between 1976 and 1979, he attended the University of the Ministry of State Security in Potsdam. His final thesis to graduate before attaining the rank of major in 1981 was titled "The education of specialist forces, security and counter-terrorism in the border customs offices of the Customs Administration of the GDR as a prerequisite for targeted and differentiated inclusion of the members of the customs administration of the GDR in the system of counter-terrorism at the border crossing points of the GDR."

== Opening of the Wall ==
Jäger later said that for him, the Wall had partially lost its meaning after Hungary had opened its border to Austria in September 1989 (following the Pan-European Picnic)—making it possible to circumvent the Berlin Wall—and he expected further changes. On 9 November, he was eating a sandwich in the break room for border crossing guards when Günter Schabowski delivered a speech on the impending passport changes for the republic's citizens. On hearing this speech, he almost choked on his sandwich requiring one of his soldiers to perform a Heimlich maneuver. On the same day, Major Manfred Sens had informed the guards as usual to "shoot, capture or eliminate trespassers" ("Grenzverletzer festzunehmen bzw. zu vernichten"). Jäger called his superior Rudi Ziegenhorn and other border crossing officers along the Wall, who told him to turn people away from the Bornholmer Straße border crossing, but allow through the "provocateurs"—but without telling them that they could never return. After realizing that keeping the gate closed could imperil the lives of people in the crowd and his own officers, he ordered the border open at 23:30.

The claim that he was the first to open the Wall was questioned in 2009, when Heinz Schäfer, a former Stasi colonel, claimed that he had opened his crossing at Waltersdorf in the south of the city a few hours earlier, which would explain the supposed presence of East Berliners in the area before Jäger opened his gate.

== Later life ==
Following the fall of the Wall, he was unemployed. In 1997, he was able to save up enough to open a newspaper shop in Berlin with his wife. He has since written a book about his experience called The Man Who Opened the Berlin Wall.
