= Bornholmer Straße border crossing =

Former border checkpoint in Berlin

Coordinates: 52°33′17″N 13°23′55″E

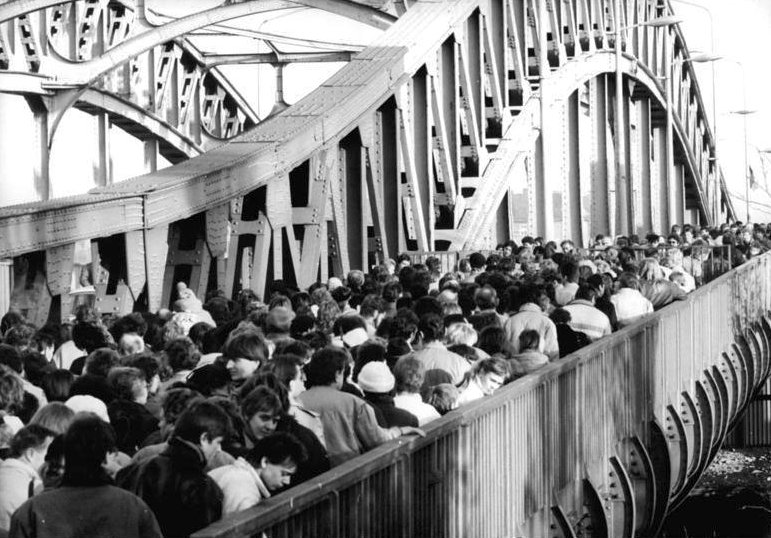
Crowds crossing the Bösebrücke at the Bornholmer Straße border crossing on 18 November 1989

The Bornholmer Straße border crossing was one of the border crossings between East Berlin and West Berlin between 1961 and 1990. The crossing was named after the street on which it is located, Bornholmer Straße ("Bornholm Street"), which in turn was named after the Danish Baltic Sea island of Bornholm. The actual border between East and West Berlin ran along railway lines which were crossed by the Bösebrücke.

The Bornholmer Straße border crossing played the historic role of being the first border crossing to be opened during the fall of the Berlin Wall on 9 November 1989.

== Events of 9 November 1989 ==
Immediately after news of East Germany's somewhat mistaken announcement on the removal of border controls by Socialist Unity Party of Germany (SED) official Günter Schabowski was broadcast at 8:00pm on 9 November 1989, thousands of East Germans began gathering at the Bornholmer Straße border crossing, demanding that border guards immediately open its gates to let them through to West Berlin.

The surprised and overwhelmed guards made many hectic telephone calls to their superiors about the problem but it became clear that no one among the East German authorities would take personal responsibility for issuing orders to use lethal force. As a result, the vastly outnumbered soldiers had no way to hold back the huge crowd of East German citizens. In face of the growing crowd, the guards finally yielded.

At 9:20 p.m., in order to relieve some of the pressure created by the crowds, the guards let the first few people leave for West Berlin, although the head of the passport control unit Lieutenant-Colonel Harald Jäger had their passports stamped invalid, thus expatriating the passport holders without their knowledge. By 11:30 p.m., however, the crowds had grown so large that he – still without official orders – finally raised the barrier. In the hour that followed, around 20,000 people were able to cross the Bösebrücke bridge without being checked, and were greeted by French soldiers and gendarmes in full combat gear and armed with machine guns and assault rifles. By then, similarly large crowds had gathered at the other border crossings, and controls were similarly lifted.

== Gallery ==
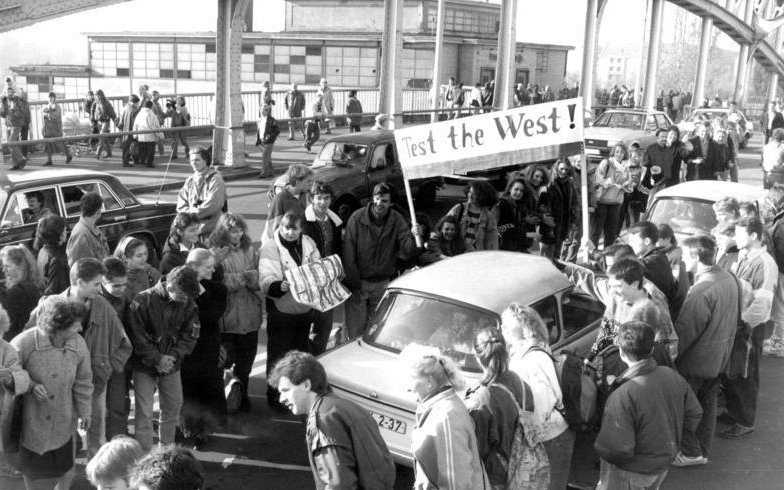
Students from West Berlin encouraging East Berliners as they cross the border the day after the fall of the Berlin Wall.

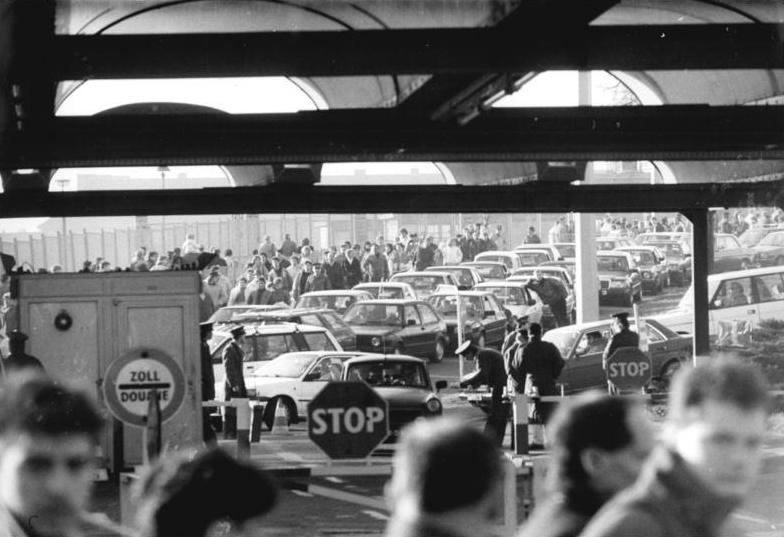
Crowds at the border crossing on 18 November 1989.

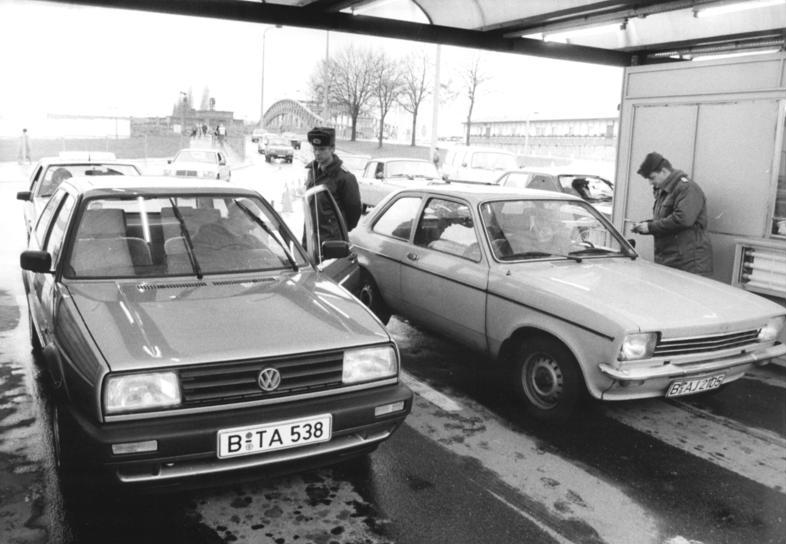
East German border guards check cars on the first day of visa-free entry into East Germany for West Berlin and West Germany citizens on 24 December 1989.

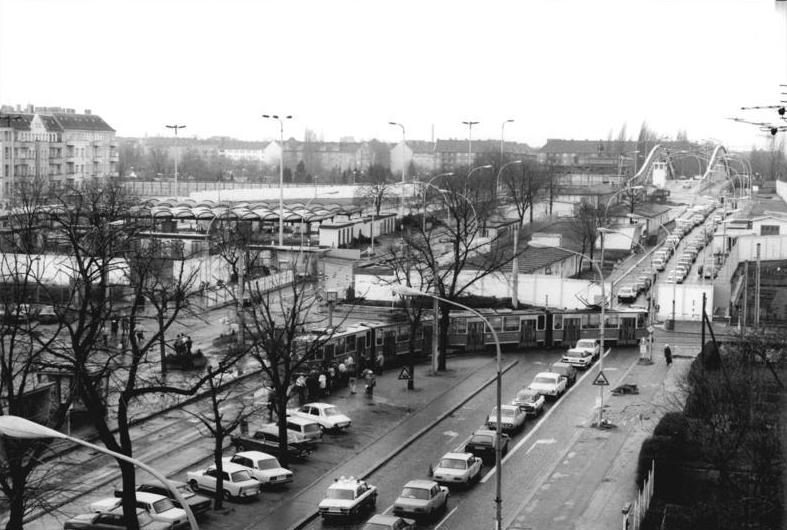
Queues of cars heading towards the border crossing in February 1990.

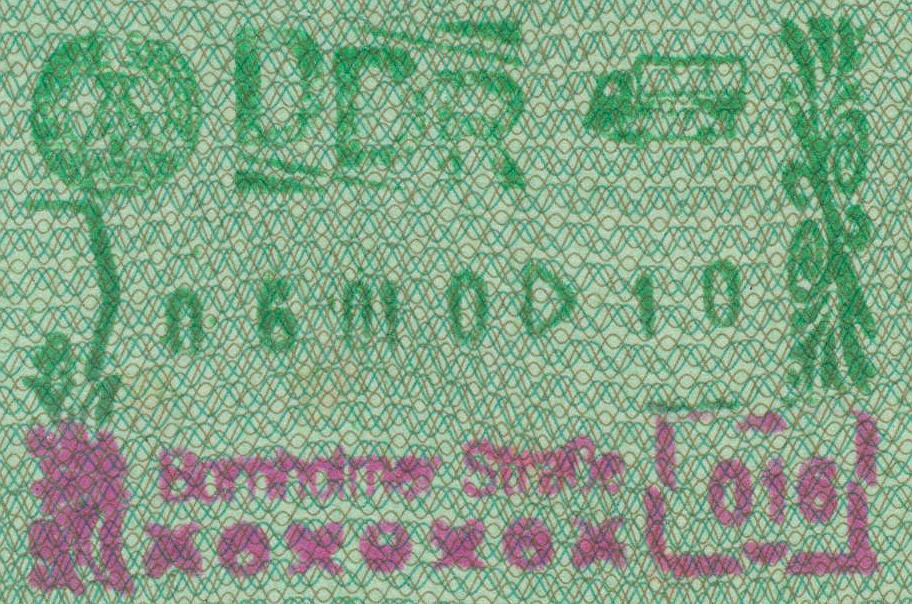
East German passport stamp from Bornholmer Straße border crossing.
