= Petőfi Prize =

The Petőfi Prize was established by the Public Foundation for the Research of Central and Eastern European History and Society in 2009 recognizes outstanding efforts made to advance freedom and democracy of Central European nations. MOL Group (Hungarian Oil and Gas Public Limited Company) has joined the foundation. The founders intend to reward those who have made the noblest and gravest decisions of human coexistence without making compromises by a bust and a sum of EUR 10.000.

== Description ==
The Public Foundation for the Research of Central and Eastern European History and Society established the Petőfi Prize in 2009 to acknowledge the outstanding efforts made to advance freedom and democracy of Central European nations. This prize is awarded to those outstanding people of the region or the whole world who have set an example and helped freedom to advance with their personal sacrifice and persistence. The founders wish to recognize and honour those people who, similarly to Petőfi, have made the noblest and gravest decisions of human coexistence without making compromises by the prize – a bust of Sándor Petőfi by Richárd Juha- and the sum of EUR 10.000 reward. Without them our world would have been deprived of values which provide meaning for notions like freedom, justice and sacrifice.

The Hungarian Oil and Gas Public Limited Company, MOL, has joined the foundation, give due weight to the message that, just like one of the most successful companies of Hungarian economy, this prize requires the utmost attention both locally and worldwide. The laureates are chosen both by the board and MOL from several nominees.

== Laureates ==
- 2024 - Mircea Dinescu, Előd Kincses
- 2023 - János Áder
- 2022 – Wolfgang Schüssel
- 2021 – Horia-Roman Patapievici
- 2020 – Tamás Deutsch and Imre Kónya
- 2019 – Sándor Lezsák and József Szájer
- 2018 – Václav Klaus
- 2017 – Stanisław Dziwisz
- 2016 – László Regéczy-Nagy és László Balás-Piri
- 2015 – Karol Sauerland
- 2014 – Imre Kozma and Mária Filep
- 2013 – Vladimir Bukovsky
- 2012 – Miroslav Kusý
- 2011 – Mart Laar
- 2010 – Anne Applebaum
- 2009 – László Tőkés, Gabriel Andreescu
