= Kincses =

Kincses is a Hungarian surname. Notable people with the surname include:

- Mihály Kincses (c. 1918–1979), Hungarian football player
- Péter Kincses (born 1980), Hungarian football player
- Tibor Kincses (1960–2025), Hungarian judoka
- Előd Kincses (1941–2025), Hungarian-Romanian lawyer

== See also ==
- Csongor Kincse, Hungarian politician
