= Austria and Hungary =

Austria and Hungary may refer to:

- Austria-Hungary, former European state from 1867 to 1918.
- Austria–Hungary relations
