= Pan-European Picnic =

1989 peace demonstration held on the Austro-Hungarian border near Sopron, Hungary

Coordinates: 47°45′26″N 16°37′20″E

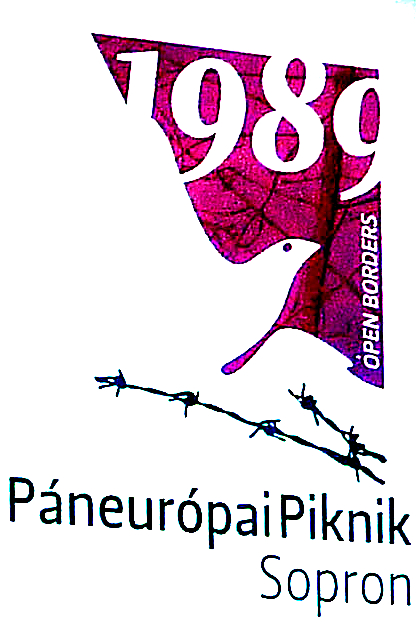
The official emblem of the Pan-European Picnic in Hungarian

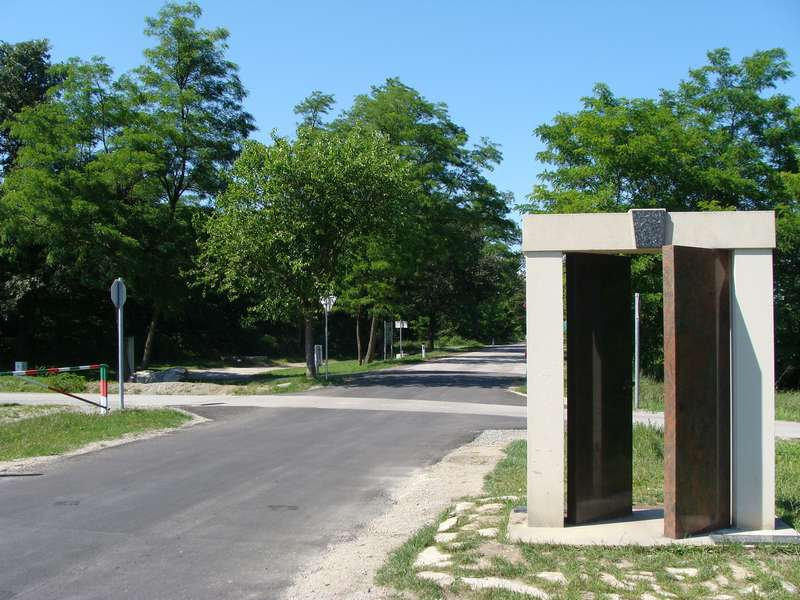
The border crossing where the Pan-European picnic took place

The Pan-European Picnic (German: Paneuropäisches Picknick; Hungarian: Páneurópai piknik; Slovak: Paneurópsky piknik; Czech: Panevropský piknik) was a peace demonstration held on the Austro-Hungarian border near Sopron, Hungary, on 19 August 1989. The opening of the border gate between Austria and Hungary at the Pan-European Picnic was an event in the chain reaction, at the end of which Germany reunified, the Iron Curtain fell apart, and the Eastern Bloc disintegrated. The communist governments and the Warsaw Pact subsequently dissolved, ending the Cold War.

The idea of opening the border at a ceremony and testing the Soviet Union's response came from Ferenc Mészáros of the Hungarian Democratic Forum (MDF) and Otto von Habsburg, then the President of the Paneuropean Union and the former Crown Prince of Austria-Hungary. The idea was brought up by them to Miklós Németh, then the Hungarian prime minister, who also promoted the idea.

The Pan-European Picnic itself developed further from a meeting between Otto von Habsburg and Ferenc Mészáros in June 1989. The local organisation in Sopron took over the Hungarian Democratic Forum, and the other contacts were made via Habsburg and the Hungarian Minister of State Imre Pozsgay. The Austrian Paneuropean Union and the MDF took care of advertising the event with leaflets that were distributed in Hungary. The patrons of the picnic, Habsburg and Pozsgay, who were not present at the event, saw the planned event as an opportunity to test Mikhail Gorbachev's reaction to an opening of the border on the Iron Curtain.

The official emblem of the picnic was a dove breaking through the barbed wire. At the picnic several hundred East German citizens overran the old wooden gate, reaching Austria unhindered by the border guards around Árpád Bella. It was the largest mass exodus since the Berlin Wall was built in 1961. The Hungarian borders were opened on 11 September, and the Berlin Wall fell on 9 November. The Warsaw Pact disintegrated in 1991.

== Background ==
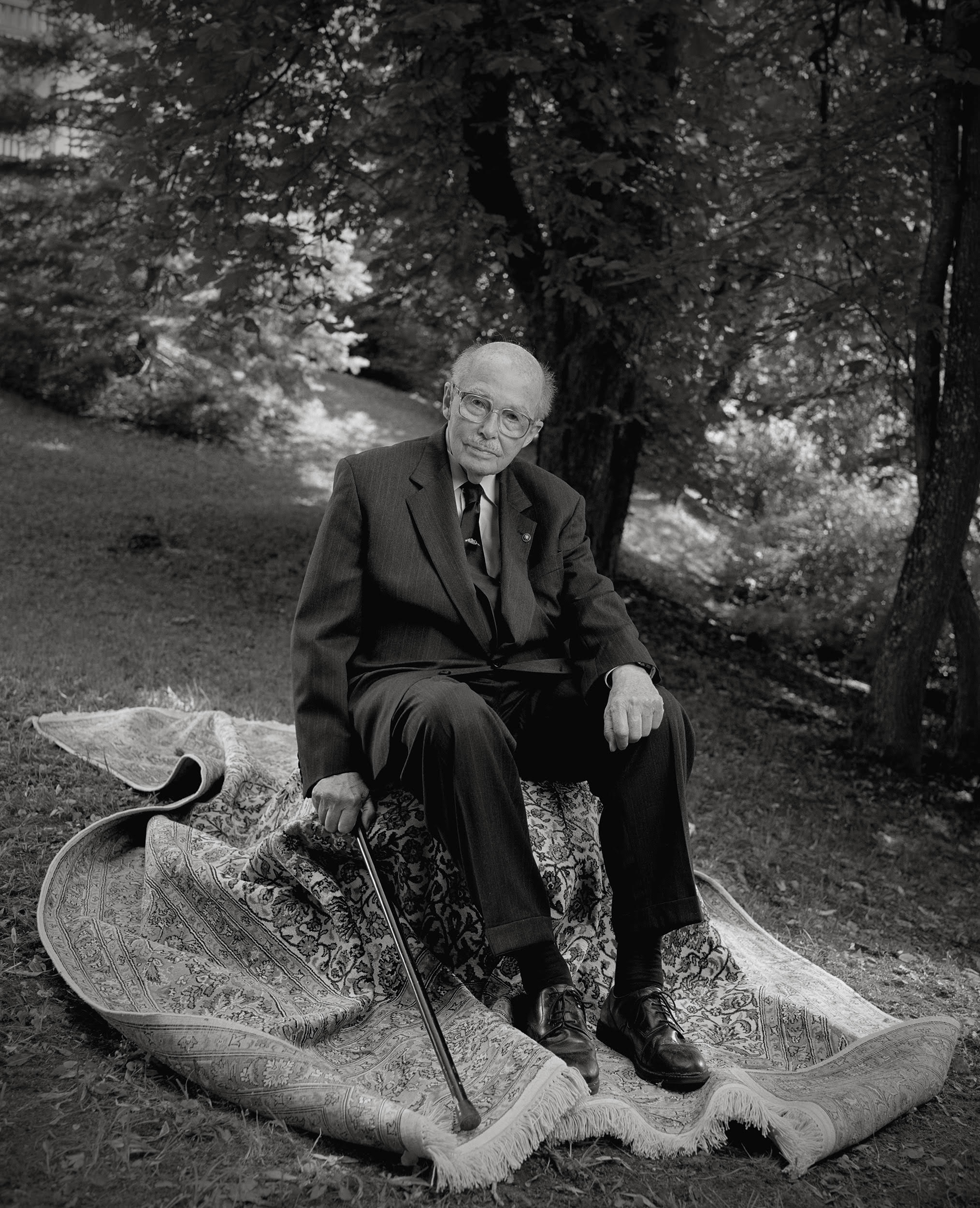
Otto von Habsburg, who was a key figure in the event

In 1989, the situation in Central Europe was tense. Ruled by dictatorial governments, the people in Eastern Bloc countries demanded democratic elections, freedom of speech, and the withdrawal of Soviet troops. The Iron Curtain and its physical manifestations in heavily guarded border fences and crossings, as seen in Czechoslovakia and in East Germany, were dominant factors in the movement to unite Europe. Although some countries, such as East Germany, had a hard-line Communist power structure, others, such as Hungary, took a reform-oriented approach. Supported by Mikhail Gorbachev's new policies, the reformist Communist countries' leadership accepted the necessity for change (Perestroika). Non-governmental organisations and new political parties played a sizable role in the movement towards a democratic, multiparty system. That year, round-table discussions were held in several Central European countries to develop a consensus on changing the political system. In February formal discussions began in Warsaw, and on 4 April the Polish Round Table Agreement was signed, legalising Solidarity and scheduling parliamentary elections for 4 June. Solidarity's victory surpassed all expectations.

In this context, there were individual organisations in the west that were constantly trying to get in touch with the people in the east or to find ways to weaken the communist system, among them the Austrian branch of the Paneuropean Union, of which Karl von Habsburg had been President since 1986. Under his responsibility, attempts were made to sustainably support the opposition and freedom movements in Central and Eastern Europe, and the Paneuropa Union participated intensively in political events in what was then Czechoslovakia, Hungary, then Yugoslavia, and the Baltic States. But in public opinion in the West, as well as in the East, nobody thought of the possibility of a quick dissolution of the communist structures in the East. The Iron Curtain was strictly guarded and fully intact until August 1989, even if individual technical systems were dismantled.

According to its files, Department III (the Hungarian secret police) had known since 10 July 1989 that an event was planned at the border on the basis of a suggestion from Otto Habsburg. He informed the department on 31 July 1989, about preparations for this event. The operational group of the Ministry for State Security of the GDR (the presence of the Stasi in Hungary) had information about the Pan-European Picnic, but their officers did not react either and the Stasi had no choice but to organise the return transport of the abandoned vehicles.

=== Developments in Hungary ===
Beginning in 1989, the Hungarian government claimed that it opened refugee camps for Romanian citizens that supposedly crossed the Hungarian-Romanian border near Debrecen. The government further claimed that in the early summer of 1989, thirty to forty thousand people sought asylum in Hungary. Although the Hungarian government had been bound by a bilateral agreement to return the refugees to Romania, Hungary signed the United Nations Convention Relating to the Status of Refugees (CRSR) in 1989.

The financial situation was difficult in Hungary. Prime Minister Miklós Németh decided that his government could not afford to maintain automated border control along the border with Austria; spare parts would come from the West and were paid for in hard currency. Németh believed it was no longer necessary to secure the borders; Hungarians were allowed to travel freely, and the government did not intend to continue fortifying the country's western borders. On 27 June Austrian Foreign Minister Alois Mock and his Hungarian counterpart, Gyula Horn, cut the border fence in a symbolic ceremony highlighting Hungary's decision to dismantle its border surveillance, which had begun on 2 May.

East Germans, who often spent their summer holidays on Lake Balaton (where they could meet relatives and friends from West Germany), remained in Hungary during the summer of 1989. In the spring of 1989, the GDR Interior Minister Friedrich Dickel asked for travel opportunities to Hungary to be restricted because of the inadequate border security in Hungary, but the Stasi head Erich Mielke had refused to do so in view of the situation in the GDR.

On 20 June Otto von Habsburg, heir apparent of the House of Habsburg and member of the European Parliament from 1979 to 1999, addressed an audience at the university of Debrecen about Europe without borders and the European Parliament elections' effect on Central Europe. His speech was followed by a dinner, at which two representatives of the conservative Hungarian Democratic Forum (MDF) party (Mária Filep and Ferenc Mészáros) suggested a picnic for local residents at the Austro-Hungarian border to celebrate the bonds between Austrians and Hungarians.

Although the national leadership of the MDF had reservations, Filep (supported by local Fidesz and MDF groups) recruited participants and searched for a suitable location. She wanted to include guests at the "common destiny camp", a gathering of intellectuals and opposition activists from Central and Eastern European countries in Martonvásár (not far from Lake Balaton) scheduled to end date on 20 August. The site chosen for the picnic was on Bratislava Road in Sopron, a border crossing since 1922.

The gathering was intended as an informal meeting of Austrians and Hungarians at the border meadow. Permission to open the border station for three hours was granted, so pedestrians from both countries could experience Europe without borders. Its organisers recruited Otto von Habsburg and Imre Pozsgay, a reformist member of the Hungarian Socialist Workers' Party (MSzMP) and Minister of State, as patrons of the event.

Former Prime Minister Miklós Németh explained in 1989, a 2014 documentary, that the picnic offered the Hungarian government a way out of a situation which had arisen with East German tourists holidaying in Hungary that summer:

No one of us forecast it that during the summer [of 1989] we will have another hot potato in our hands, namely the German refugee problem. I got the first news that, interestingly, after the 2–3 weeks long holiday, some of the GDR citizens decided to stay, and it was clear to me, that this is now very, very serious. In Budapest, around the Lake Balaton, all the camping sites were fully, fully packed, even along the road, without any facilities around them, of course. End of September, and the cold weather arrives, we did not have facilities to provide, these people will die here, frozen, during the winter. So, why didn't I just send them home? For years we were obliged to pick up East Germans and send them [home] on special airplanes, organised by the infamous Stasi, to take them home, in many cases to prison or serious harassment. We couldn't keep doing that, certainly not with 100,000 people. We had to find a clear solution. We could not keep them here, and we could not send them back. The only remaining option was the unthinkable: to somehow send them to the west, but this was bound to provoke not only Honecker and his regime in East Germany, but also the hard-liners in Moscow, so what to do, what to do?

Under East German law, citizens were required to request permission to travel to the West; they saw the picnic as an opportunity to act. The destiny of these approximately 100,000 people was the top news story in prime-time news broadcasts for several months, showing Europe the urgent need to find a suitable way out. The East German rulers, planning to celebrate the 40th birthday of East Germany on 7 October 1989, were keen to hide the problems and were silent about the mass exodus of their own people.

In a re-enacted scene in Anders Østergaard's documentary 1989, Prime Minister Németh tells an aide, "Gyuri, I think this could actually be a very good thing. I think it would be good if some of the East Germans used this opportunity and fled." "Fled?" "Yes. And we would not interfere with it." "I see." Németh explained in the documentary:

This was really a great opportunity to us to assess the Russians' reactions, to test the tolerance of the Soviet Union. So we sent out an order to the border troops: "Please instruct your guards, if you see any East Germans on the border, let them pass. Do not intervene."

The first information about the pan-European picnic appears on July 10, 1989, in the files of the Hungarian State Security Service. The Hajdú-Bihar District State Security Service informed headquarters that the thought was raised during a visit by Otto von Habsburg to Debrecen on June 20, 1989 – in the middle of a discussion with local leaders of the Hungarian Democratic Forum (MDF). "To arrange a so-called" bacon roast "at the Austro-Hungarian border in August or September 1989 and then repeat it every month." "The MDF accepted Otto von Habsburg's suggestion and the Presidium commissioned a member to organize the event." The Hungarian Defense Against Internal Reaction, informed on July 31, 1989, informed their superiors about the pan-European picnic in Sopron.

The MDF took on the local organization (local permits, benches and stage, food) and designed leaflets. For those interested, it also provided a sketch of how to get to the border and the place of the picnic. The MDF then distributed Hungarian-language leaflets in Hungary and German-language leaflets in Austria. For the later success, however, the spread of the German-language text in Hungary among the East Germans vacationing there was decisive. The Austria Paneuropa Union, which was under the leadership of Karl von Habsburg, distributed thousands of German language leaflets in Hungary inviting people to a picnic near the border near Sopron. Radio Freies Europa also drew attention to the event. Many of the GDR citizens understood the message and came there. The advertised motto of the event was also "Dismantle and take with you", so every visitor was allowed to cut off a piece of the barbed wire and take it with them. According to a Stasi spy, leaflets were also attached to parked cars at the Formula 1 Grand Prix near Budapest in early August. It is unclear who distributed all the leaflets up to Lake Balaton, and in some cases it is assumed that the West German BND was involved. The East German secret service Stasi was warned by a report by the East German ambassador in Budapest on August 11, 1989, about the planned picnic and the opening of the border, but no countermeasures were taken.

== Picnic events ==
In a symbolic gesture agreed to by both Austria and Hungary, a border gate on the road from Sankt Margarethen im Burgenland, Austria to Sopronkőhida, Hungary was to be opened for three hours on 19 August. Otto von Habsburg was represented at the picnic by his daughter Walburga von Habsburg, who gave his greetings. The Hungarian writer and dissident György Konrád also spoke, who until 1988 was only allowed to publish his critical texts abroad. Music was played and speeches made on a wooden stage; there was wine, beer, grilled food, and goulash. Many of the participants also cut about a kilometer (1100 yards) from the fence of the old border system. This symbolic demolition party was officially approved. The fence area in question at Sopronpuszta was dismantled not just for symbolic purposes, but also because it was supposed to be used for a planned game reserve. Aside from Walburga von Habsburg and the officials of the MDF, very few Hungarians and Austrians were present at the picnic, but television teams and journalists were there.

Shortly before 3 p.m., the first twenty or thirty East German citizens arrived at the border gate, which was still guarded by armed forces. The gate was torn open and the mostly young GDR citizens ran to the Austrian side, where some journalists and a camera team from an Austrian broadcaster were waiting. During the picnic and the "symbolic" opening of the border, the refugees crossed the Iron Curtain in three waves. It was the largest refugee movement from East Germany since the Berlin Wall had been built. The news of the mass exodus spread very quickly. The Hungarian border guards reacted calmly to the emerging mass exodus and did not intervene. The leading border officer at the time, Árpád Bella contributed significantly to this. In addition, thousands of GDR citizens waited a little further away for a chance to cross the border, because they were not confident that the border really had been opened. As a result, only 661 people crossed the border that day.

Prime Minister Németh said in 1989, "I was in my office all day, I was nervous, very nervous. Luckily, there was no knocking on my door by the Soviet ambassador, no telephone calls from Moscow."

More than six hundred East Germans fled to the West, many leaving their cars at the border. The very extensive media coverage made it clear to the Eastern European population that the Iron Curtain had partially broken open, that the Soviet Union was not intervening, and that the governments in the East were increasingly losing power due to indecisive action.

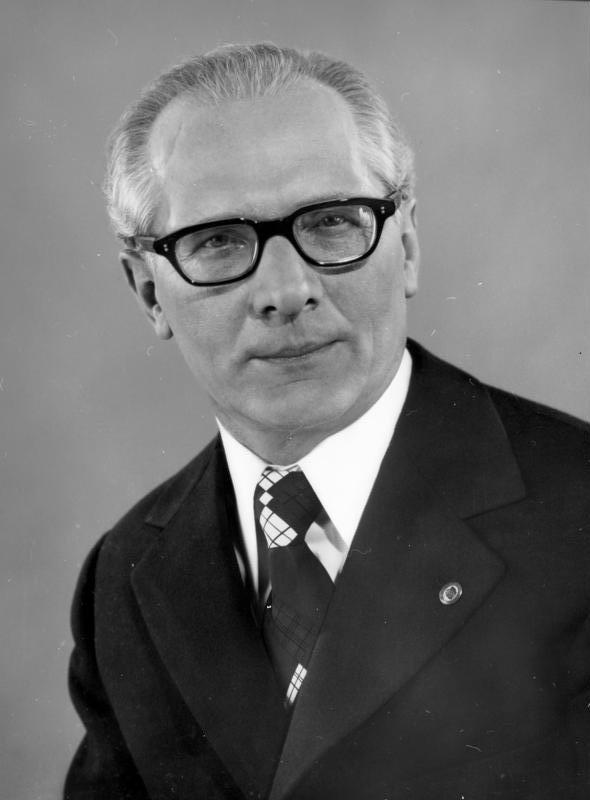
Erich Honecker, who lost control in summer 1989

East Germany's Erich Honecker told the Daily Mirror about the picnic, "Habsburg distributed pamphlets right up to the Polish border, inviting East German holiday-makers to a picnic. When they came to the picnic, they were given presents, food, and Deutsche Marks, before being persuaded to go over to the West." Through this statement, the astonished public became even more aware of the powerlessness of the hitherto brutal rulers in their own area.

In the GDR Politburo (Honecker was absent due to his illness – Günter Mittag was the chairman), Habsburg's and Pozsgay's Paneuropean Picnic was one of the rare topics of discussion. Slogans were made such as: "The enemy's counterrevolution and its front-line reporting is at work", "The GDR is the tower in battle", "We must further counter the underhand attacks of the GDR's enemies", "We mustn't be hypnotized by the western media. The enemy has a big concept, he wants to smash everything of ours. We have to attack the enemy. This is imperialism in the FRG. Those are the real culprits." But no action was taken.

In Budapest and around Lake Balaton, thousands of East Germans hesitated to cross the border. Over the next few days, the Hungarian government increased the number of guards patrolling its western border and a relatively small number of refugees reached the West. Another picnic spontaneously planned by an employee of the West German television station ZDF for August 23, 1989 was forcibly prevented by Hungarian security forces at the border.

The Pan-European Picnic was organised by four Hungarian opposition parties: the Hungarian Democratic Forum, the Alliance of Free Democrats, Fidesz, and the Independent Smallholders, Agrarian Workers and Civic Party. Its patrons were Christian Social Union in Bavaria, Otto von Habsburg, and Hungarian Minister of State and reformer Imre Pozsgay.

=== Later developments ===
The Hungarian government restored normal border controls after the picnic. In August 6,923 people were arrested at the border; of those, 5,527 or eighty percent were East Germans. The Hungarian government feared that laxness would lead to hard-liners assuming control in the Kremlin, leading to a coup d'état against Gorbachev. During the night of 21–22 August Kurt-Werner Schulz, a 36-year-old East German from Weimar, was killed. Németh said later:

We decided to get back to the rule books on the border control, but at the same time, we, or I, created a trap for myself [...] One of the advisers quite clearly told me, "Look, this is a very risky business now, Miklos, do you know what this means? It means that from now on every single murder will be your fault. Do you understand?" I felt ashamed that it had happened. I made the conclusion in one sentence: "We are opening up".

On 22 August Németh flew by helicopter to Bonn to meet with West German Chancellor Helmut Kohl and Kohl's foreign secretary, Hans-Dietrich Genscher. There, Németh "dropped a bomb on their table":

Esteemed Chancellor, an important decision has been made in Budapest. Returning the refugees to East Germany is out of the question. We shall open the border, and by mid-September, all East Germans should be able to leave our country... I will never forget his eyes. Kohl, the big boy, was moved to tears.

Németh assured Kohl that the Hungarians would handle the border situation, and permission from Gorbachev was unnecessary. Kohl telephoned Gorbachev, informing him of Németh's decision, and Gorbachev assured Kohl that the Hungarian premier "was a good man". On 11 September the border was opened, and 30,000 East Germans fled to the West.

Walter Momper, mayor of West Berlin in 1989, expected the Berlin Wall to open and said: "We expected that one day the storm would come across the border from behind, actually, since Otto von Habsburg and the Pan-Europa-Union had the pan-European picnic on the border between Hungary and Austria on August 19, 1989 in Sopron. Hundreds of them came. It was stupid that people from the GDR should cross the border via Hungary and Austria, if there was a border crossing right by them."

After the East German regime tried to block the Hungarian route, thousands fled to the West via Czechoslovakia and there was a massive popular uprising. On 17 October Honecker was relieved of his position as head of state, and on 9 November the gates to West Berlin were opened. After his fall, Honecker said of Otto von Habsburg in relation to the summer of 1989, "this Habsburg drove the nail into my coffin."

== Today ==
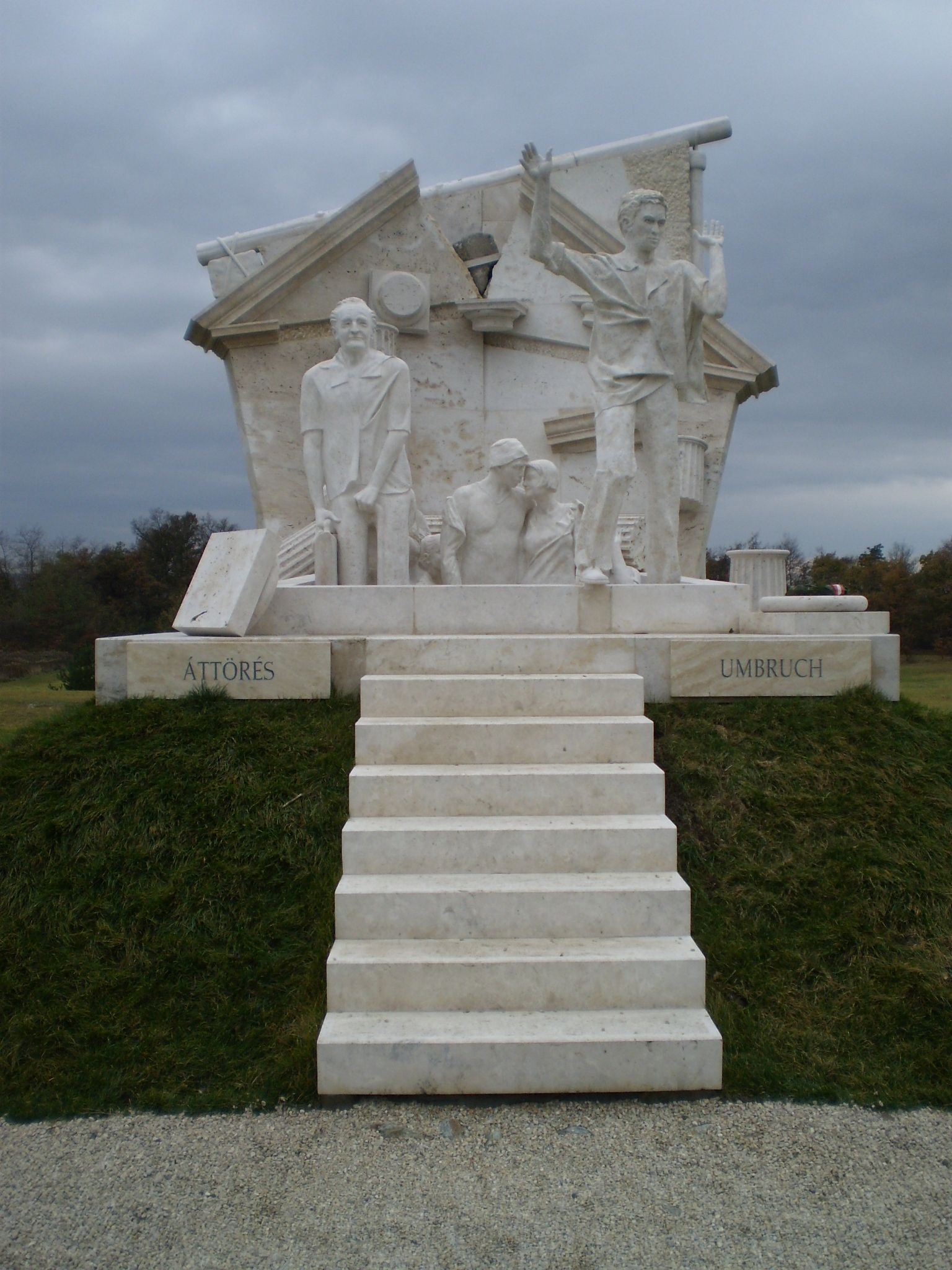
Pan-European Picnic monument by Miklós Melocco

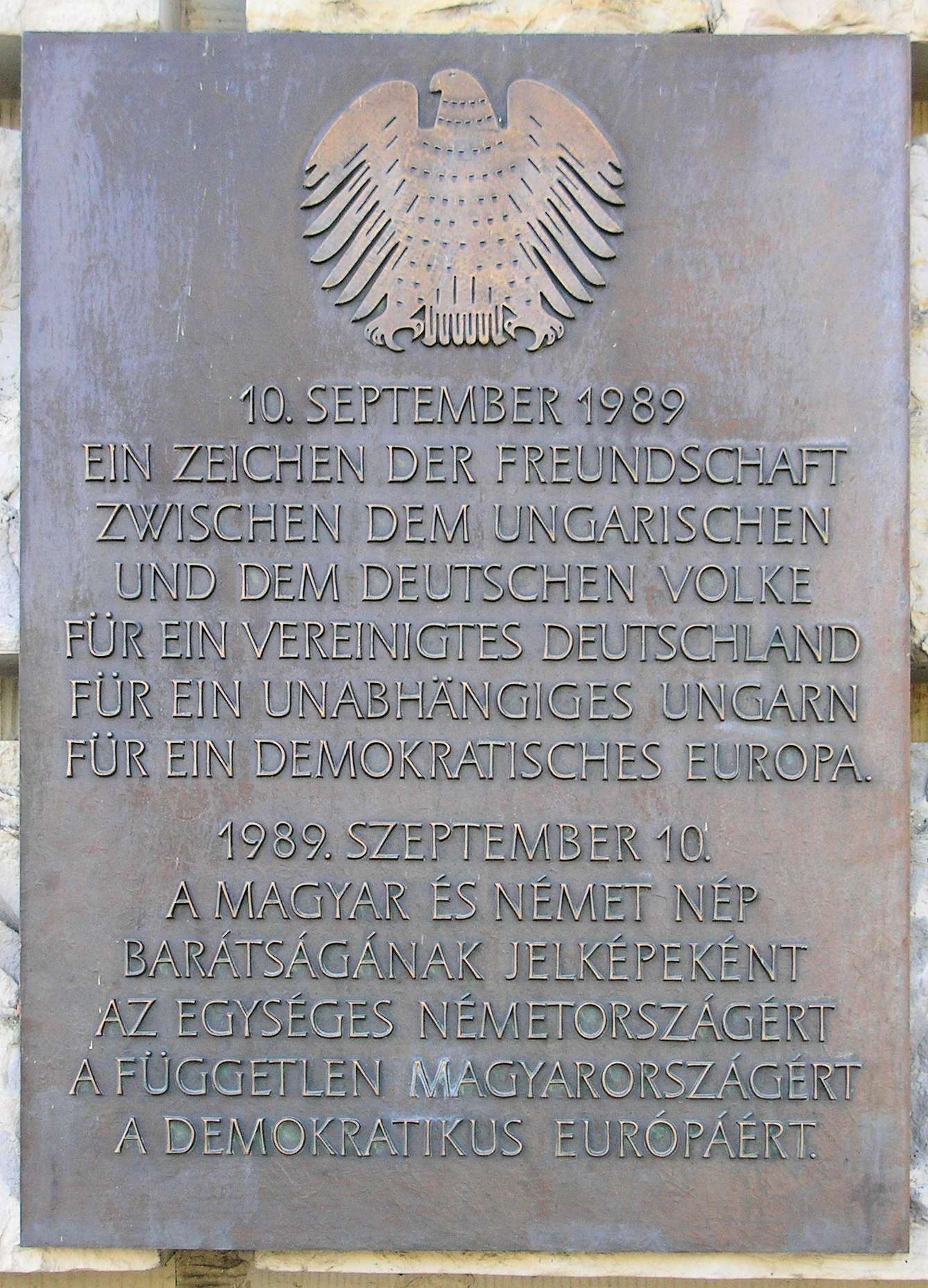
The plaque commemorating the Pan-European Picnic at the Reichstag building in Berlin

The picnic site is commemorated with a monument by Miklós Melocco, a bell from the city of Debrecen, a pagoda from the Association of Japanese–Hungarian Friendship, and a wooden monument unveiled by the organisers in 1991.

In 1996 a 10-metre-high (33 ft) stainless steel sculpture by the sculptor Gabriela von Habsburg was erected in Fertőrákos near Sopron. It symbolizes a set up piece of barbed wire, which from a distance has the shape of a cross.

In 2009, EU Commission President José Manuel Barroso paid tribute to the "peaceful picnic on the Austro-Hungarian border near Sopron", which "helped to change the course of European history". This event led to the "iron curtain briefly opening" and thus contributed to its "final fall and the reunification of Germany". This marks the beginning of the end of the division of Europe through the Cold War.

The Pan-European Picnic is considered a significant milestone on the road to German reunification, and commemorative ceremonies are held annually on 19 August at the border.

In 2009, Angela Merkel (who grew up in East Germany) attended festivities commemorating the picnic's 20th anniversary, thanking the Hungarians for their courage and foresight: "Two enslaved nations together broke down the walls of enslavement... and Hungarians gave wings to East Germans' desire for freedom." Hungarian President László Sólyom unveiled a white marble monument in memory of those who risked their lives to cross the Iron Curtain, and Swedish Foreign Minister Carl Bildt said: "We must remain an open Europe of open societies and open minds, open to others beyond our present boundaries".

In August 2019, Chancellor Merkel and Hungary's Prime Minister Viktor Orbán recalled the Pan-European Picnic that took place 30 years ago and its importance for the subsequent fall of the Berlin Wall.

On the northeast corner of the Reichstag building in Berlin, a memorial plaque commemorates the pan-European picnic.

There are still some ambiguities about the exact sequence of the picnic, in particular the agreements between Otto von Habsburg, Miklos Nemeth, Imre Pozsgay and Helmut Kohl. Kohl is said to have remarked "It was all agreed beforehand." It is assumed that in addition to the local organizers and the Pan-European Organization, the West German secret service BND and the Order of Malta, which is close to the Habsburgs, were also involved in the decisive distribution of the leaflets to the East Germans.

The Pan-European Picnic is now referred to as a "great moment of mankind (German: Sternstunde der Menschheit)".

According to the Austrian historian Hildegard Schmoller, it was only through the culture of remembrance that the Pan-European Picnic became a symbol of the entire exodus of summer 1989. She argues that the important role played by the Hungarian opposition movement has increasingly been glossed over, whilst the role of Otto von Habsburg has been emphasised. She argues that this site of remembrance was constructed by politicians and the media for their own purposes, and that its significance for the collapse of the Eastern Bloc – and Austria’s active role in it – has been exaggerated.

== See also ==
- Austria–Hungary relations
- End of communism in Hungary
- Removal of Hungary's border fence with Austria
- Revolutions of 1989

== Literature ==
- Stefan Karner/ Philipp Lesiak: Der erste Stein aus der Berliner Mauer. Das Paneuropäische Picknick 1989, Graz: Leykam 2019 (Kriegsfolgen-Forschung; 30), ISBN 978-3-7011-0414-7.
- Longo, Matthew (7 November 2023). The Picnic [A Rush for Freedom and the Collapse of Communism]. New York City, New York: W. W. Norton & Company. ISBN 978-0393540789. OCLC 1473576798.
