= Removal of Hungary's border fence with Austria =

1989 after the collapse of communism

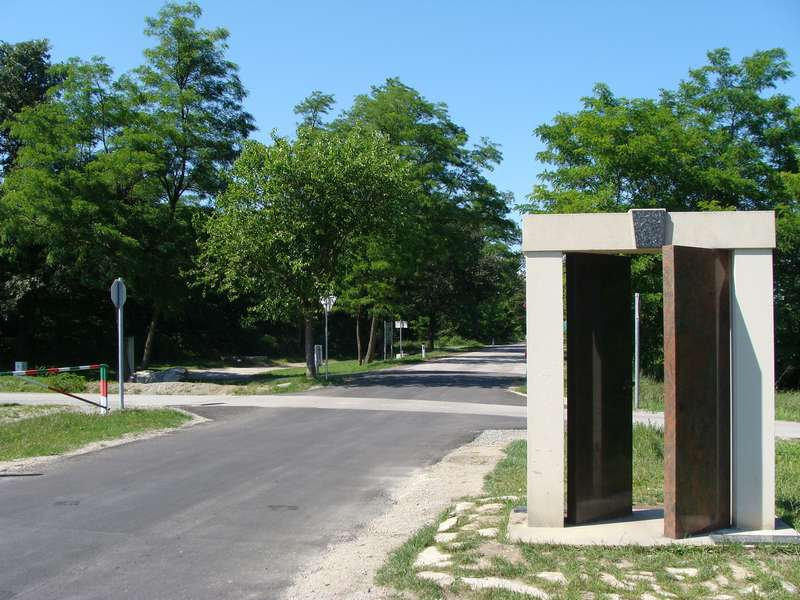
Hungary–Austria border near Sopron, Hungary

In May 1989, the Hungarian People's Republic began removing the barrier along its border with Austria, amidst the end of communism in Hungary, which was part of a broad wave of revolutions in various communist countries of Central and Eastern Europe. The border was still closely guarded and the Hungarian security forces tried to hold back refugees. The dismantling of the electric fence along the 240 kilometres (149 mi) long border was the first fissure in the Iron Curtain. The Pan-European Picnic then caused a chain reaction in East Germany that ultimately resulted in the demise of the Berlin Wall.

== History ==
In April 1989, the Hungarian government ordered the electricity in the barbed-wire border fence along the Hungary–Austria border to be turned off. On 2 May, the Border Guard of Hungary began removing sections of the barrier, filmed by Western TV crews summoned for the occasion. On 27 June Hungary's Minister of Foreign Affairs, Gyula Horn, and his Austrian counterpart, Alois Mock, held a symbolic fence-cutting ceremony at the Sopron (Hungary) border crossing.

The open border meant that it was easier for Hungarians to cross into Austria for goods and services; many Hungarians availed themselves of this to purchase consumer goods which had been unavailable or scarce in their own country; a visible sign of this in the first few weeks was that many cars could be seen in Austrian towns such as Graz with washing machines strapped to them.

The most famous crossing came on 19 August, when, during the Pan-European Picnic between Austrians and Hungarians, over 900 East Germans on holiday in Hungary rushed the border and escaped into Austria and then travelled safely to West Germany.

The open border infuriated East German officials, who feared a return to the days before the Berlin Wall, when thousands of East Germans fled daily to West Berlin. Although worried, the Soviet Union took no overt actions against Hungary, taking a hands-off approach.

== See also ==
- Austria–Hungary relations
- Cold War
- Inner German border
- Hungarian border barrier
