= Hungarians in Austria =

Hungarians in Austria ausztriai magyarok
Total population
- 90,000

Regions with significant populations
- Vienna, Burgenland, Upper Austria, Lower Austria, Salzburg, Styria, Carinthia, Tyrol

Languages
- Hungarian, Austrian German

Religion
- Catholicism

Related ethnic groups
- Hungarians

The Hungarians in Austria (Austrian German: Österreichisch Ungarn; Hungarian: Magyarok Ausztriában [ˈmɒɟɒrok ˈɒustrijaːbɒn]) numbers 25,884 according to the 2001 Census. Of these, 10,686 were in Vienna and 4,704 in Burgenland. The total number of Hungarian-speakers is estimated at 40,000, with 6,600 in Burgenland. Most of the Burgenland Hungarians live near the two district capitals of Oberwart/Felsőőr and Oberpullendorf/Felsőpulya. The Hungarian Group Advisory Council is the oldest of the official minority advisory councils in Austria.

== History ==
Hungarians of Burgenland are the descendants of frontier guards sent during the eleventh century to protect the Kingdom of Hungary. Burgenland place names contain the elements 'Schützen' or 'Wart' ( as in Obserschützen, Unterwart etc.) constituting the linguistic testimony of that historic period. (In the following centuries many of these early inhabitants assimilated into the German-speaking population of Western Hungary.) Hungarians had maintained their privileged status until 1848. Burgenland was under Hungarian rule until the 1920 Treaty of Trianon. Hungarian education continued in the interwar period in a number of municipalities. Economic decline in Burgenland after World War II led to emigration. The negative image (see Iron Curtain) of the Hungarian language by this time led to assimilation.

As a result of the recognition of the Viennese Hungarians (1992) as a part of the Hungarian minority, the Hungarian minority is composed of two parts, namely the Burgenland Hungarians and the Hungarians living in the Vienna region.

=== Viennese Hungarians ===
Hungarians established a community in Vienna from 1541 following the 1526 battle of Mohács. Towards the end of the 17th century the city became a key cultural center for Hungarians. Hungarian students graduated from the Vienna University and from the 17th century onwards there was an increasing influx of Hungarian craftsmen into Vienna. The first cultural associations were set up in Vienna in the 1860s. 130,300 residents of Vienna in 1910 were citizens of the Hungarian part of the empire, while only 45,000 of them were also ethnically Hungarians. After World War I a re-emigration started. In censuses of the Interwar period Hungarians counted between 1,000 and 2,000 people. Refugees from Hungary increased the numbers again in 1945, 1948 and 1956. Today, some 27,000 Hungarians live in Vienna.

=== Burgenland Hungarians ===
The Hungarians of Burgenland were split into four groups prior to the 1921 annexation of Burgenland:

1. Seewinkel region (Neusiedl District)
2. District municipalities including the future capital Eisenstadt
3. Oberpullendorf and Mitterpullendorf
4. The (Obere) Wart with the settlements of Oberwart and Unterwart as well as Siget in der Wart.

The first two groups were largely absorbed after World War II, especially as a result of industrialisation after 1955. When German was introduced as the official language, Hungarian was only used on a rather restricted level, mostly spoken within the family. In the post-war school system Hungarian was taught as a foreign language for 2–3 hours per week even in communities with a Hungarian majority.

== Religion ==
Two-thirds of Hungarians in Burgenland were Roman Catholic in 2004; Lutheran and Calvinist communities are also notable.

== See also ==
- Austria–Hungary relations
- Hungarian diaspora
- Immigration to Austria
- Austrians in Hungary

== Citations and references ==
=== Cited sources and other sources ===
- "Report by the Republic of Austria pursuant to Article 25 paragraph 1 of the Framework Convention for the Protection of National Minorities - Comments by the Hungarian Minority Advisory Council". Council of Europe. 2000-11-15. Archived from the original on 2012-02-24.
- "World Directory of Minorities and Indigenous Peoples - Austria : Burgenland and Viennese Hungarians". Minority Rights Group International. United Nations High Commissioner for Refugees. 2008.
- "Hungarian in Austria". Research Centre of Multilingualism. Open University of Catalonia. 1998-05-29.
- Paulston, Christina Bratt; Donald Peckham (1998). Linguistic minorities in Central and Eastern Europe. Multilingual Matters. ISBN 978-1-85359-416-8.
