= Mária Filep =

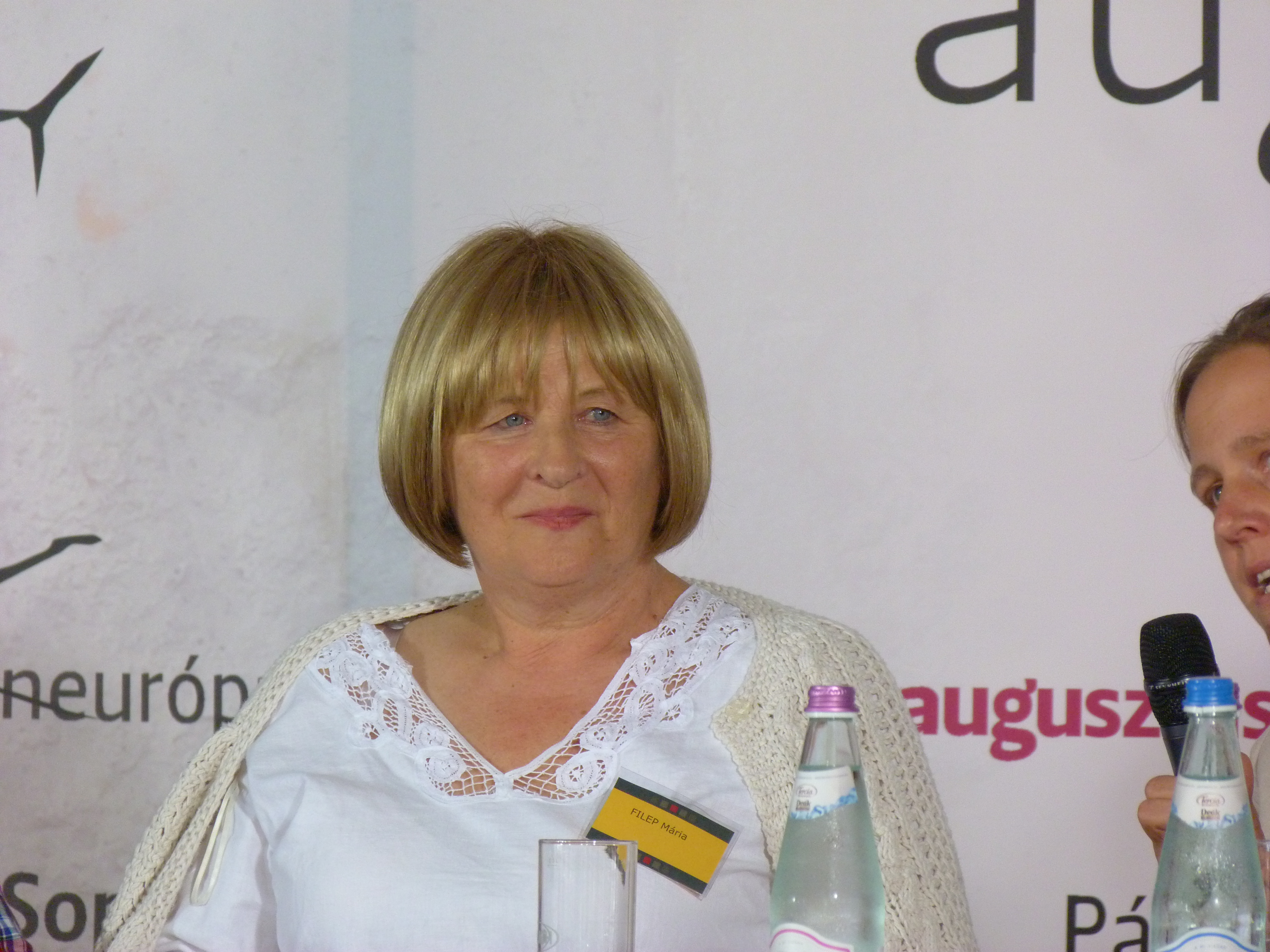
Mária Filep in 2014

Mária Filep is a Hungarian architect and main organizer of the Pan-European Picnic.

== Early life ==
Mária Filep was born in Debrecen in 1953. She completed her degree in architecture at the University of Debrecen.

== Career ==
She worked at the Hajdú County State Construction Company as an architectural engineer. She was the founding member of the Hungarian Democratic Forum in Debrecen, the first opposition organization in the town. The members gathered in pubs and restaurants at weekends.

== Pan-European Picnic ==
The idea of a Pan-European Picnic came up at one of these gatherings on 30 June 1989 in the garden of Old Vigadó Restaurant. Subsequently Filep started organizing it with a few colleagues. She risked her job and her freedom. Even though her employers suspected something was going on they did not ask questions.

At first she found little support. The Roundtable Talks of Debrecen and the Hungarian Democratic Forum (MDF) rejected her overtures as unprofessional.

However, the idea reached fruition took place with the support of individual MDF volunteers from Debrecen and Sopron. Hundreds of East-German citizens broke through the border-closure and set off to neutral Austria while the event was taking place. By doing so, they launched the destruction of the Iron Curtain (wall) separating the two countries. The pressure from East German refugees flooding Hungary has eventually led to the opening of the borders on 11 September 1989.

== Later career ==
Filep went on cooperating with the MDF, but in 1994 she decided to leave the party and end her political activity. She returned to her job but she still finds civil activity important in public life. She is the president of Hajdúság–Partium Preservation Society, which is committed to urban protection, architectural and natural heritage conservation and a member of the Board of Governors of the Hungarian Urban and Village Preservation Association.

She places special emphasis on preserving the heritage of the Pan-European Picnic. She remains a member of the board of trustees. In 2000 she organized a conference in Debrecen about cyanide contamination and the consequent ecological disaster. She organized several exhibitions titled Changes in Central Europe to familiarize people with the ideas of the Picnic.

== Recognition ==
- She received the Order of Merit of the Hungarian Republic, Officer's Cross in 1999.
- In 2004 she was awarded the Aphelandra prize for her contribution to the regime change.

== Sources ==
- Filep Mária visszaemlékezése, Debrecen, 2014. April 2. Határnyitás 25.
- Magos Márta visszaemlékezése, Debrecen, 1999. február 27. A Terror Háza Múzeum tulajdonában.
- Beszélgetés Nagy Lászlóval. Kétezer Irodalmi és Társadalmi Havilap, 2009/11.
- Jeszenszky Géza: Magyarország és a kommunista dominók eldőlése. Hitel, 2009/10. 75.
- Filep Mária: Legyen ügyfél a civil szervezet. Disputa. 2004. március. 37–39.
- Megalakult a Páneurópai Piknik ’89 Alapítvány. Sopron város honlapja. >
