= Austria–Hungary relations =

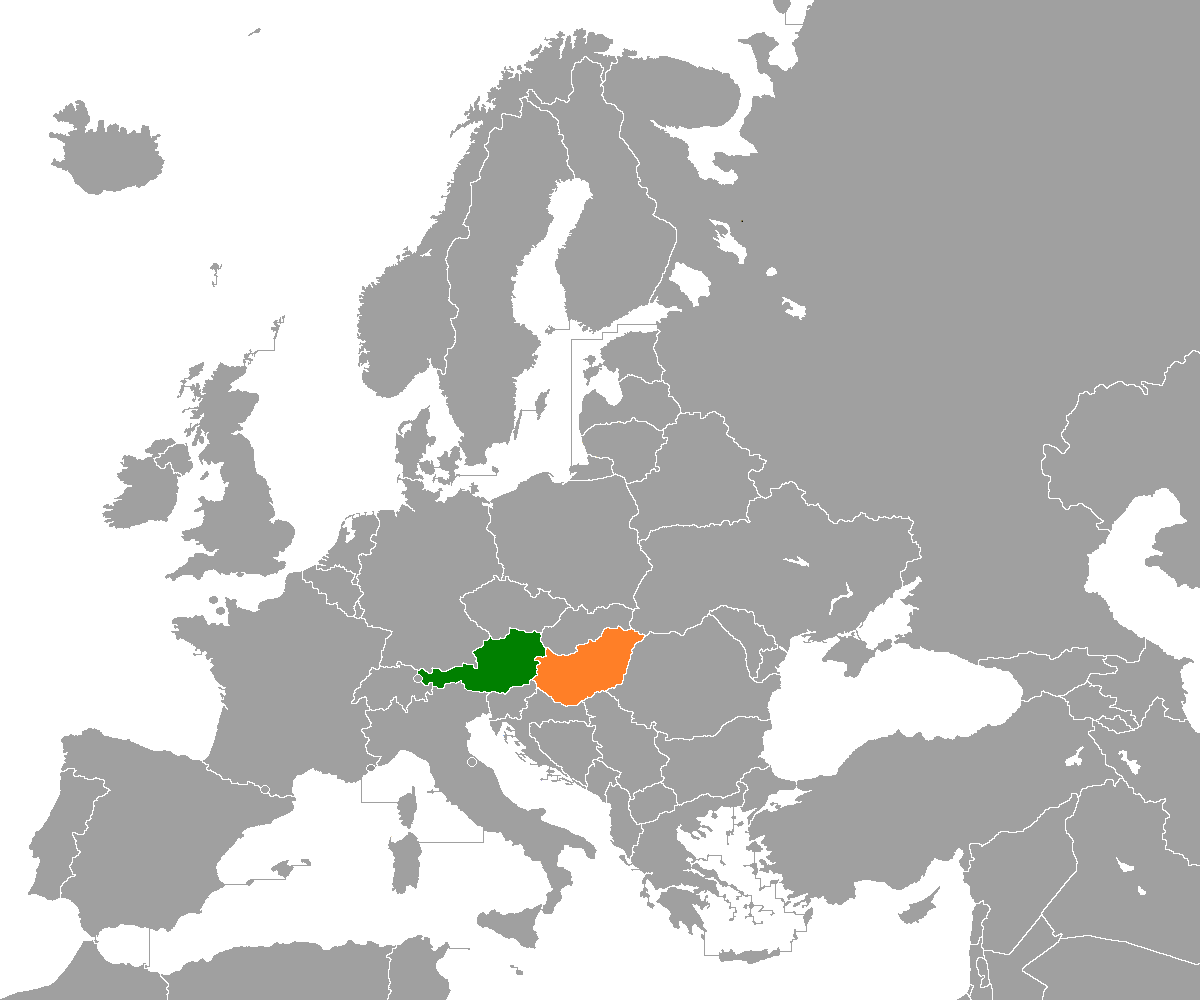

- Austria: Hungary

Diplomatic mission
- Embassy of Austria, Budapest: Embassy of Hungary, Vienna

Austria–Hungary relations refer to bilateral relations between Austria and Hungary. Historical relations between the two countries date back to the 16th century. Notably, both were part of the now-defunct Austria-Hungary from 1867 to 1918. The two countries established diplomatic relations in 1921, after their separation.

Both countries are full members of the Council of Europe and the European Union.

== History ==
=== Before World War I ===
After a series of Hungarians wars and uprisings for independence against Austrian rule (chiefly Rákóczi's War of Independence of 1703–1711 and the Hungarian Revolution of 1848–1849), Austria refused Hungarian independence but compromised by granting Hungary equal status in the monarchy. Consequently, the Austrian Emperor, Franz Joseph I also became King of Hungary.

Before World War I, a number of aristocratic Hungarian families (such as Esterházy, Batthyány and Pálffy) had their own palaces in Vienna, where their king (who was also the Emperor of Austria) resided.

Politicians and generals of both leading nations, Austrian Germans and Magyar Hungarians, were responsible for the disastrous foreign policy of the monarchy that led towards World War I. Thence these two were treated as defeated enemies after World War I by the Allies of World War I. Both shared the experience of seeing millions of nationals having to live in other countries: the Austrians were not allowed to integrate the Germans of Bohemia and Moravia into their republic, the Hungarians had to leave the Magyars of Transylvania to Romania and those north of the Danube to Czechoslovakia (today Slovakia).

In 1918, Hungary gained full independence when the Hungarian parliament voted for the Dissolution of Austria-Hungary and Count Mihály Károlyi revoked the 1867 compromise.

=== After World War I ===
According to the Treaty of Versailles, 1919 and the Treaty of Trianon, 1920, Hungary had to cede its westernmost part, called Deutsch-Westungarn, to Austria, since these districts were inhabited by Germans for centuries. Sopron would have been the natural capital of the new Austrian State of Burgenland. Hungary did not agree to relinquish this city, so the Allied powers ordered a referendum, which the Hungarians won. Although many Austrians considered the polls to be irregular, the decision was treated as definitive. The area called Burgenland by the Austrians was handed over to Austria in the autumn of 1921. Even today, Hungarian may be used as an official language in some communities of Burgenland. Some Hungarian aristocrats like the Esterházys and Batthyanys kept their vast estates in Austria, even after their Hungarian estates were expropriated in 1945.

During World War II, Hungarian prisoners of war were among Allied POWs held in the Stalag 317/XVIII-C German POW camp operated in St Johann im Pongau in German-annexed Austria.

=== Cold War era ===
Political development of Hungary and Czechoslovakia towards communist regimes after 1945 made Austrian politicians extremely cautious in their relations with the Communist Party of Austria, even though it did not get much support at the elections. The Iron Curtain made Hungarians and Austrians living near the border feel the division of Europe quite personally.

During the Hungarian Revolution of 1956, Austrians hoped Imre Nagy, Pál Maléter and the thousands of revolutionaries would succeed. When the Red Army intervened, the Austrian neutrality policy, adopted in 1955, did not stop the government deploying the army (Bundesheer) at the eastern border with the order to shoot any foreign soldier entering Austria. Tens of thousands of Hungarian refugees found their way into Austria by the bridge at Andau and other ways. (In 1957, U.S. writer James Michener published his novel The Bridge at Andau.) The refugees were received in Austria with great sympathy.

The most prominent refugee was Archbishop Cardinal József Mindszenty, the Primate of Hungary. Liberated from imprisonment during the revolution, he lived at the American Embassy in Budapest until 1971, when he agreed to leave Hungary. He then travelled to Vienna under U.S. protection and lived at the "Pazmaneum", a seminary for Hungarian priests, until his death in 1975. In 1991 his remains were reburied at the cathedral in Esztergom in Hungary.

Another refugee of 1956 was Prince Pál Esterházy. Expropriated in Hungary, he lived from his vast estate in Burgenland (which as of 2013 belongs to his widow Melinda Esterhazy). But as Burgenland seemed too close to Communist Hungary for him, he preferred to reside in Zurich with his wife.

During the 1970s, Hungary under János Kádár curbed the oppressive state control and implemented a new policy called "Goulash Communism". Bruno Kreisky was then head of government in Austria, and official relations between Hungary and Austria thawed. Commentators, referring to the names of the two politicians, spoke of a new "K & K era". In the 1980s, both countries discussed plans were to hold a joint world exhibition ("Expo 1996") in Vienna and Budapest; a negative referendum on the issue, held in Vienna, killed the plan.

In 1989, the Hungarian government decided to tear down the Iron Curtain at the border with Austria, and on 27 June 1989 they staged a "tear-down action" together with Austria, at which foreign ministers Alois Mock and Gyula Horn cut through barbed wire with pliers in the presence of news photographers and reporters from around the world. The photographs, published worldwide, prompted many East Germans vacationing in Hungary to move to West Germany via Hungary and Austria immediately. Hungarian sources later commented that at the time of this photo opportunity most of the Iron Curtain had already been demolished.

=== 21st century ===
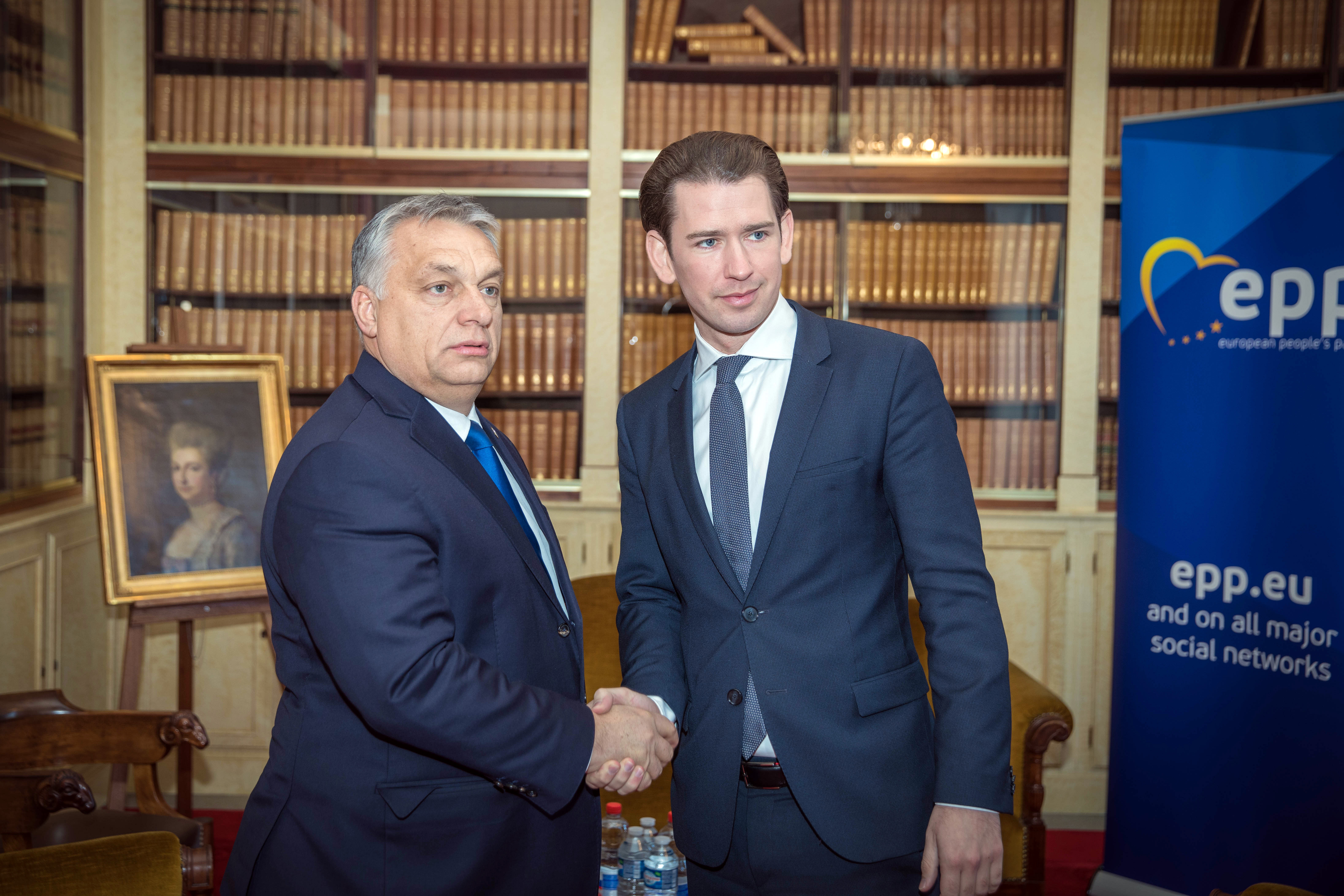
Hungarian Prime Minister Viktor Orbán and Austrian Chancellor Sebastian Kurz on 13 December 2018

Both countries are members of the European Union, and since the end of 2007, the Schengen Agreement has allowed citizens to cross the border without control wherever there is a right of way. Austrian entrepreneurs have set up or bought banks, factories and shops in Hungary, vintners from Burgenland make wine in Hungary, and Austrian farmers have bought or leased Hungarian farmland.

In the mid-2000s, the gasoline company OMV, which is partly owned by the Austrian state, tried to obtain influence over the Hungarian gasoline company MOL Group by buying its shares, with the goal of merging the two companies. Hungarian public opinion and the Hungarian government were largely against this movement, and a law was passed to obstruct it. On 16 June 2008 the European Commission stated that because OMV was already the biggest player in the oil and gas markets in central Europe, a merger with MOL would seriously hamper competition in the region. In early 2009 OMV, seeing no chance to realize its plan, sold its MOL shares to a Russian energy company and announced to plan investments in other countries.

In 2009, both countries remembered the bicentenary of composer Joseph Haydn's death. Haydn, born in Lower Austria, died in Vienna, but had lived and worked for the Esterházy princes for 30 years in western Hungary, part of which is now the Austrian Burgenland.

== Győr–Sopron–Ebenfurth Railway ==
This railway company with headquarters in Sopron is a joint enterprise of the states of Hungary (66.5%), Austria (28.6%) and a holding belonging to ÖBB Austrian Federal Railways (4.9%), which is due to sell its shares to the Strabag building company if the European Commission agrees. In Hungarian it is called Győr-Sopron-Ebenfurti Vasút (GySEV), in German it was called Raab-Oedenburg-Ebenfurther Eisenbahn (ROeEE) until 2008 and is now called Raaberbahn.

The company maintains the following railway lines:

- Győr/Raab–Sopron/Ödenburg–Ebenfurth (Lower Austria), the main line of the company
- Sopron/Ödenburg–Szombathely/Steinamanger (parallel to the Austrian border, in Hungary only; operated by MÁV, the Hungarian State Railway, until 2002)
- Szombathely/Steinamanger–Szentgotthárd/St. Gotthard (as above; operated by MÁV until 2006)
- Neusiedl am See (Burgenland)–Fertőszentmiklós (Hungary), German: "Neusiedler Seebahn"
- Széchenyi Museum Railway near Nagycenk/Groß-Zinkendorf (Hungary), a narrow-gauge track constructed in 1972

The main line of the company was licensed to a private company by the Hungarian government in 1872. The Györ−Sopron line opened to traffic around 1876. The "Neusiedler Seebahn" was opened in 1897. Traffic between the two countries continued even during the dissolution of Austria-Hungary, World War II, and the Cold War after it.

Beginning in the 1980s, the company got more business, especially in freight. A new freight terminal in Sopron was constructed. In 1987, the main line was electrified.

== European Union and NATO ==
Austria joined the EU in 1995. Hungary joined the EU in 2004. While Hungary became a member of NATO in 1999, Austria has never been a member of NATO.

== Resident diplomatic missions ==
- Austria has an embassy in Budapest.
- Hungary has an embassy in Vienna and a consulate-general in Innsbruck.
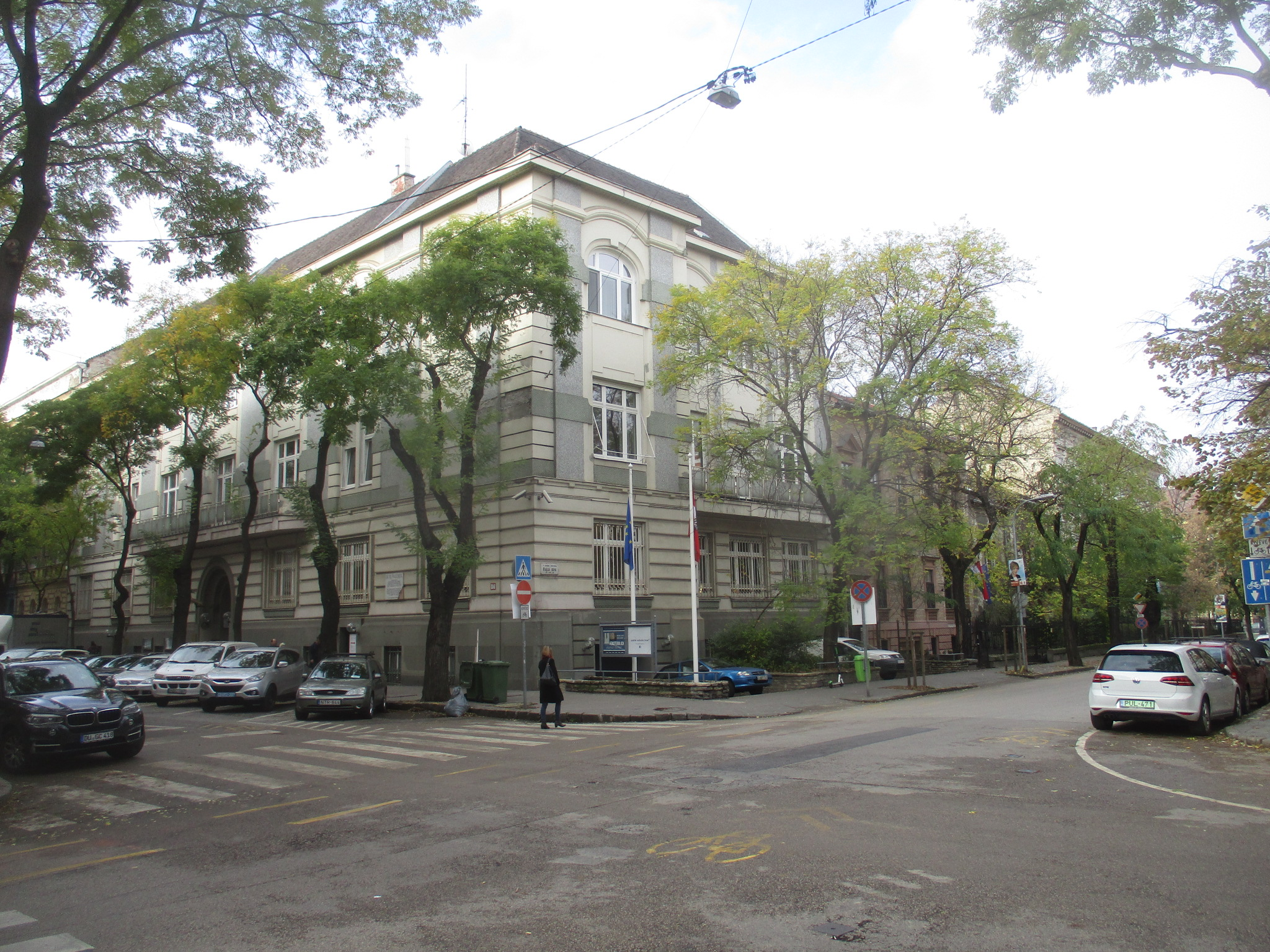
Embassy of Austria in Budapest

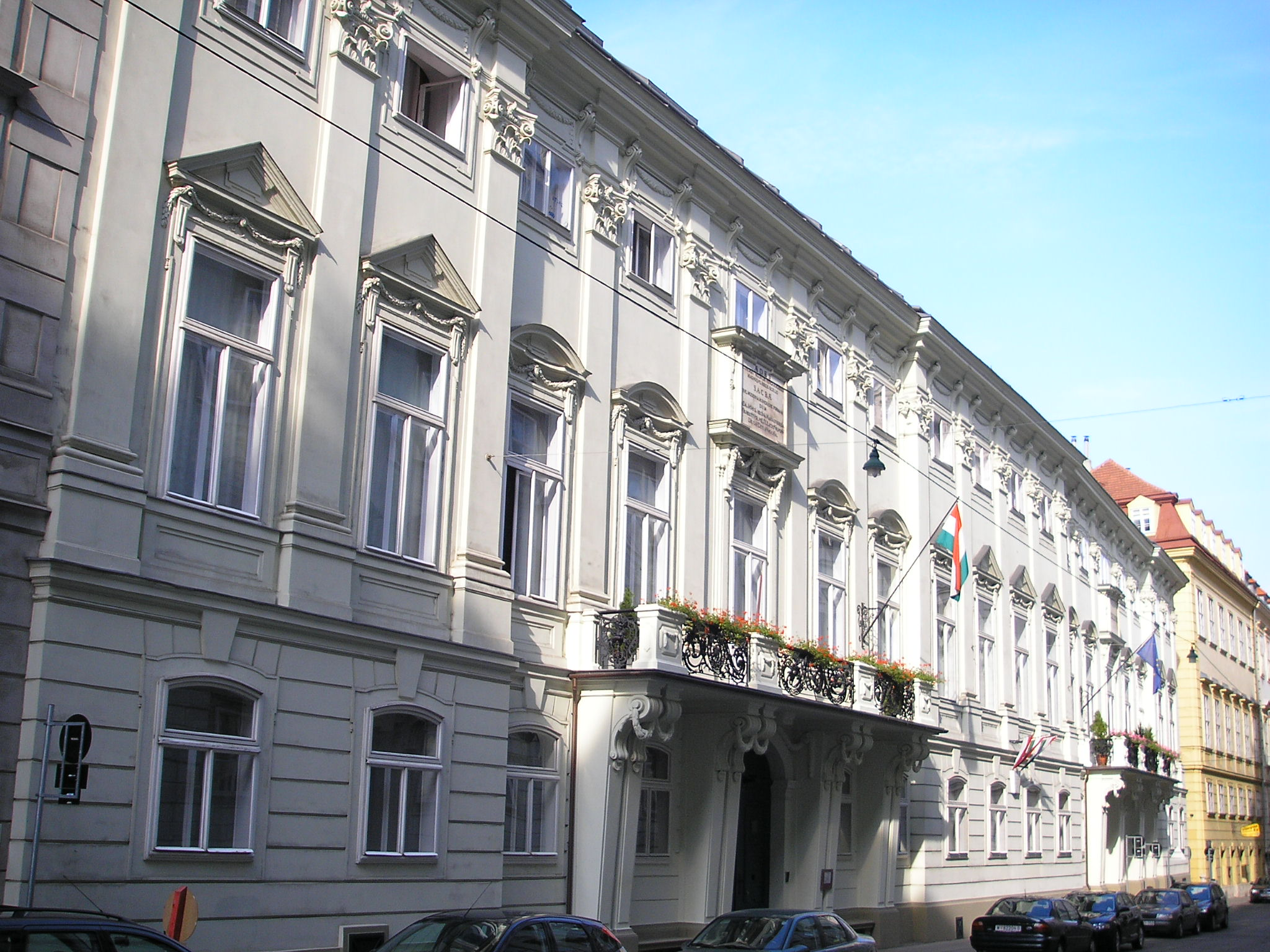
Embassy of Hungary in Vienna

== See also ==
- Foreign relations of Austria
- Foreign relations of Hungary
- Austrians in Hungary
- Hungarians in Austria
- Andrássy Gyula German Language University of Budapest
