= Előd Kincses =

Romanian-Hungarian lawyer and writer (1941–2025)

Előd Kincses (2 October 1941 – 25 June 2025) was a Romanian-Hungarian lawyer, legal and public writer.

== Life and career ==
Kincses was born 2 October 1941 in Târgu Mureș (Hungarian: Marosvásárhely). He became a legal advisor in his hometown in 1964. He was a member of the Romanian Lawyers' Association, and his legal commentaries were published in the Revista Română de Drept. He also regularly published articles on sports in Új Élet. In 1989, he was the defense counsel of László Tőkés in his eviction trial, which eventually led to the 1989 Romanian Revolution.

On 2 January 1990, as the successor of Károly Király, he became the vice-president of the National Salvation Front and the Provisional Council of National Unity in Mureș County. During the "Black March" of 19–20 March 1990, he played a key role in shaping events as vice-president. With his personal actions, he prevented thousands of Szeklers from Harghita and Covasna counties from entering Târgu Mureș, as he believed that the power of the time needed an escalation of the riots. After the clashes, he asked the Hungarian population of Târgu Mureș as a responsible leader to go home and not respond to the provocations. Seeing the situation deteriorate, he repeatedly asked for the intervention of the Romanian Army and Police, which was repeated by Radio Târgu Mureș. In the face of the lack of help and order, as well as the increasing clashes, he appealed to the Hungarian population of Târgu Mureș to defend themselves, and he also asked for the help of the surrounding villages with a Hungarian majority to come to help and prevent the influx of Romanian armed peasants into the city. His decision proved to be the right one, and the people of Târgu Mureș finally defended themselves.

Following the ethnic clashes, he became the focus of attacks by Romanian extremist elements, and sought refuge in Hungary and Vienna during the period of the first arrests and show trials. From December 1991 to August 1992, he was the Secretary General of the World Federation of Hungarians.

He later worked as a lawyer in Budapest, and when the political situation subsided, he returned to Transylvania. He ran as an independent candidate in the 2008 local elections in the area of Marosszék, but was defeated by Béla Markó.

Kincses died in Târgu Mureș on 25 June 2025, at the age of 84.
