= Bush Library =

Bush Library may refer to:

- George Bush Presidential Library, the presidential library of George H. W. Bush
- George W. Bush Presidential Center, the presidential library of George W. Bush
