= Great Plains Art Museum =

- Established: 1981; 45 years ago
- Location: 1155 Q Street, Hewit Place; Lincoln, Nebraska
- Coordinates: 40°48′56″N 96°42′16″W
- Type: Art museum
- Website: plains.unl.edu/

The Great Plains Art Museum is a fine arts museum in Lincoln, Nebraska dedicated to Great Plains art. It opened in 1981 at the University of Nebraska–Lincoln and is operated by the school's Center for Great Plains Studies. It was founded with the Christlieb Collection, containing sculptures, paintings, drawings, and photographs, donated by John and Elizabeth Christlieb of Bellevue, Nebraska.

The Christlieb Collection includes works by Albert Bierstadt, William Henry Jackson, Frederic Remington, Charles Marion Russell and Olaf Wieghorst. Subsequent acquisitions and donations have expanded the museum's collections to include works by Lyman Byxbe, John Philip Falter, Michael Forsberg, Veryl Goodnight, Jackson Pollock, Norman Rockwell, and Grant Wood.

Exhibits are typically rotated several times per year and include artwork from the permanent collection, guest-curated exhibitions, and traveling exhibits. The center and museum are located at Hewit Place on Q Street in downtown Lincoln, Nebraska. The museum is free and open to the public.
