= J. Wayne Stark Galleries =

- Established: 1992
- Location: Texas A&M University, College Station, Texas
- Coordinates: 30.6127°N 96.3407°W
- Director: Catherine Hastedt

The J. Wayne Stark Galleries is an art museum on the campus of Texas A&M University in College Station, TX. It is run by the University Art Galleries Department, which is a part of the Division of Student Affairs. The art gallery is named after J. Wayne Stark, the first director of the Memorial Student Center.

== History ==
The program began in 1973 with the creation of the Office of University Art Collections and Exhibitions run by J. Wayne Stark, then Special Assistant to the President for Cultural Development. This office began to catalog the existing collections at the university as well as securing new acquisitions.

In 1990 construction began on the Stark Galleries, thanks to a seed gift by Sara and John H. Lindsey ‘44, of Houston. Additional funding for the structure came from other donors and the university. The Stark Galleries opened to the public in February 1992.

From 2009, the Memorial Student Center had been undergoing a major renovation and the Stark Galleries had been temporarily closed. The Stark Galleries received another generous contribution from Mary and James B. Crawley of Norman, Oklahoma for the renovation project. The gallery reopened on April 21, 2012 featuring about 10,000 sq. ft. of exhibition space in four galleries, catering facilities, and an education room. The Crawley Gallery and the Lindsey Gallery in Stark Galleries are named after the two biggest donors.

The programming activities for Stark Galleries are managed by the University Art Galleries Department.

== J. Wayne Stark ==
John Wayne Stark was born 16 December 1915 in Lamesa, Texas. After graduating from high school in the small west Texas town of Winters, Stark received a bachelor's degree in history from Texas A&M in 1939. He attended the University of Texas Law School but withdrew before graduating to serve in World War II.

In 1947, he returned to the Texas A&M campus to begin work overseeing the construction of the Memorial Student Center. He became the Texas A&M sponsor for Experiment in International Living in 1959. This program enabled approximately 400 A&M students to travel overseas to live and work. Stark served the University for 33 years before retiring in 1980, but his legacy has continued on campus and in the community.

In 1992, the University officials named and dedicated the Stark Galleries in his honor for his commitment and belief in the arts.

== Art collections ==
Until the Stark Galleries were built, temporary exhibitions focusing on the arts and humanities were held in Rudder Exhibit Hall and other locations on campus. Presently, the collections include almost 10,000 objects. The majority of them focus on 19th and 20th century American art with a strong emphasis on Texas art and artists. However, as the collection has developed over the years primarily through donations, visitors can find other works ranging from Pre-Columbian pottery to 19th century German genre paintings.

Additionally, the Permanent Collection is home to sculpture and various other decorative arts. The Stark Galleries oversees the campus collection of 23 outdoor sculptures, including works by Pompeo Coppini, Lawrence Ludtke, Veryl Goodnight and Hans Van de Bovenkamp.

=== Highlights ===
The Permanent Collection of the Stark Galleries focuses on American paintings, prints, drawings and photographs of the 19th and 20th centuries. Some artists represented include Dawson Dawson-Watson, Julian Onderdonk, H.O. “Cowboy” Kelly, Peggy Bacon, Laura Gilpin, Charles Schorre and Dorothy Hood.

Harold Osman "Cowboy" Kelly (1884–1950): Kelly is considered one of the foremost primitive, or "folk," artists of the twentieth century. Though he created only a limited number of works in his lifetime, yet his pieces have become internationally renowned in the folk art genre. Born in Bucyrus, Ohio, nearly all of his works depict the Midwestern-based agrarian society he came to love as a young man, including reflections of his adult life in Texas. Some of his most well recognized works include “More Good People”, “Fourth of July Races”, “October- First Monday”, and “Hill Top Dance Hall”. The J. Wayne Stark Galleries houses the single largest collection of original works by "Cowboy" Kelly.

Dorothy Hood (1919–2000): Born in Bryan, Texas, Hood was highly influenced by modern art, philosophy, poetry and early space exploration. Her work melds elements of abstract and geometric forms in fluid designs creating thoroughly unique images that reflect the artists wonder and curiosity about the universe and the world around her. Much of Hood’s work is represented in prestigious art collections, including twenty-three museums in the U.S., three in Switzerland and one in Mexico City. The J. Wayne Stark Galleries proudly boasts two of Hood’s original masterpieces in our permanent collection: “The Day the Mountain Thanked the Sea” and “Space Riders”.

Dawson Dawson-Watson (1864–1939): Born in London, Dawson-Watson lived and painted all across Europe before moving to the United States, where he worked at prestigious art colleges, first in Connecticut as director, then in St. Louis as a teacher. Later he moved to San Antonio, Texas, where he began painting the flora of the southwest. His experiences in Texas eventually led him to paint a collection of scenes of the Grand Canyon, a series for which he is now most well-known. The J. Wayne Stark Galleries holds three of his landscape masterpieces.

Edward M. "Buck" Schiwetz (1898–1984): Born in Cuero, Texas, Schiwetz studied architecture at Texas A & M University, though he never practiced his degree. An avid self-taught artist, upon graduation he moved to New York where he garnered a reputation for his skill in a variety of media. His notoriety grew and he eventually established his own advertising firm. Despite suffering major medical difficulties, he worked as an artist-in-residence for Texas A&M University's centennial celebration in 1976, during which time he produced a portfolio of scenes from Texas A & M University. Schiwetz was a prolific artist and his works are found in major museums both in the United States and around the world. The collection of his original works at The J. Wayne Stark Galleries is one of the largest held by a public museum.

Julian Onderdonk (1882–1922): Born in San Antonio, Texas, Onderdonk trained on the East Coast for several years before returning to his hometown to paint. His most widely recognized works are his "bluebonnet" landscapes, three of which graced the Oval Office at the White House during the George W. Bush administration. A gallery dedicated to his work can be found at the Dallas Museum of Art. Texas A&M University houses two of his works, “Miles and Miles of Bluebonnets” and “At the Edge of the Forest”.
Miles and Miles of Bluebonnets by Julian Onderdonk

=== Campus sculptures ===
Texas A&M University has 23 sculptures across the campus. Some of the sculptures are by prominent artists like Lawrence M. Ludtke, Pompeo Coppini, and Hans Van de Bovenkamp.

James Earl Rudder by Lawrence M. Ludtke (1929–2007)
James Earl Rudder sculpture by Lawrence M. Ludtke

Twelfth Man by George E. "Pat" Foley (1922–1998)
Twelfth Man sculpture by George E. "Pat" Foley

Lawrence Sullivan Ross by Pompeo Coppini (1870–1957)
Lawrence Sullivan Ross sculpture by Pompeo Coppini

Silver Taps by Rodney Culver Hill

Menos by Hans Van de Bovenkamp

Victory Eagle by Kent Ullberg
