= The Day the Wall Came Down =

Two sculptures by Veryl Goodnight

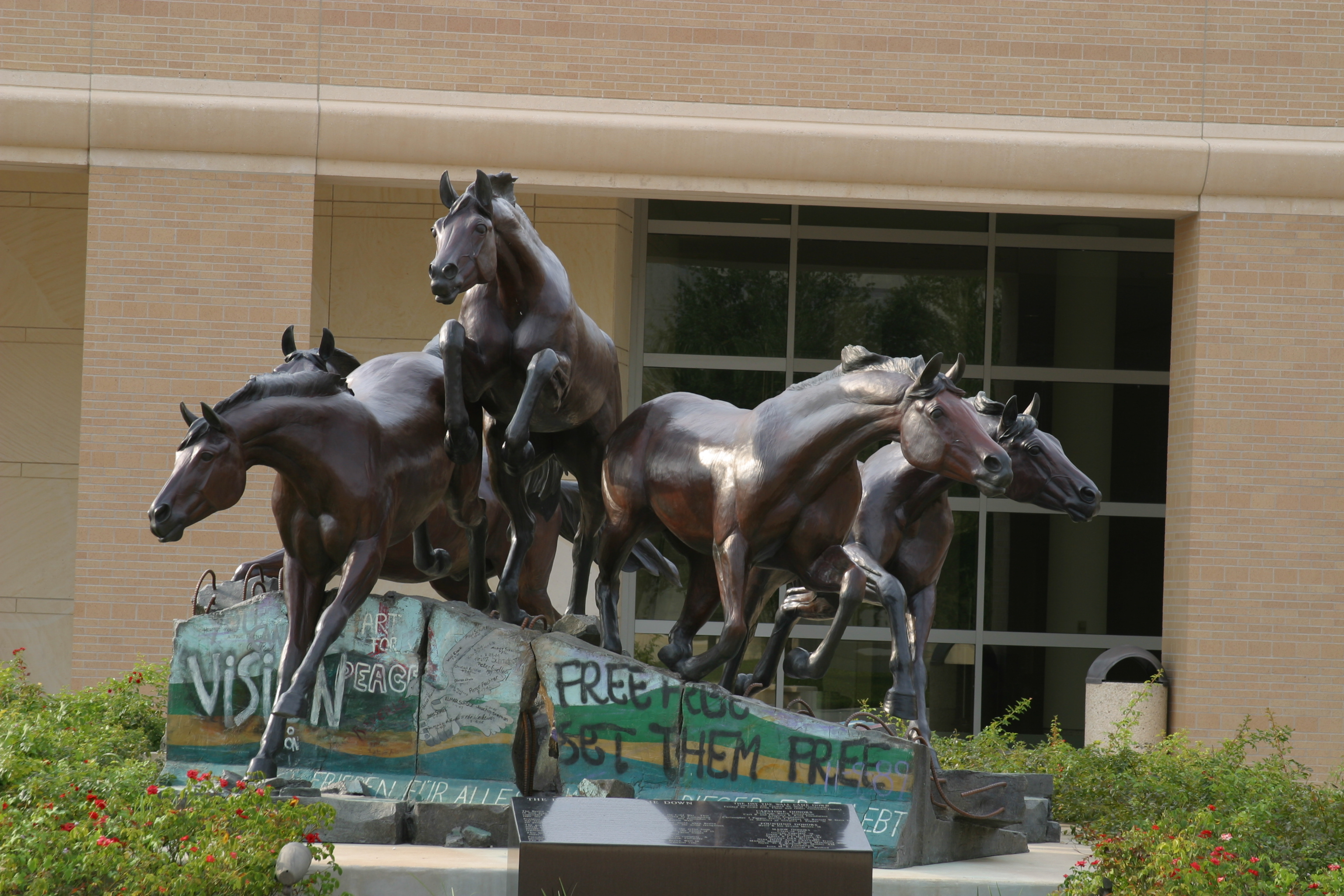
The Day the Wall Came Down (1996) by Veryl Goodnight, exhibited on the grounds of the George Bush Presidential Library, depicts five horses leaping over actual pieces of the Berlin Wall

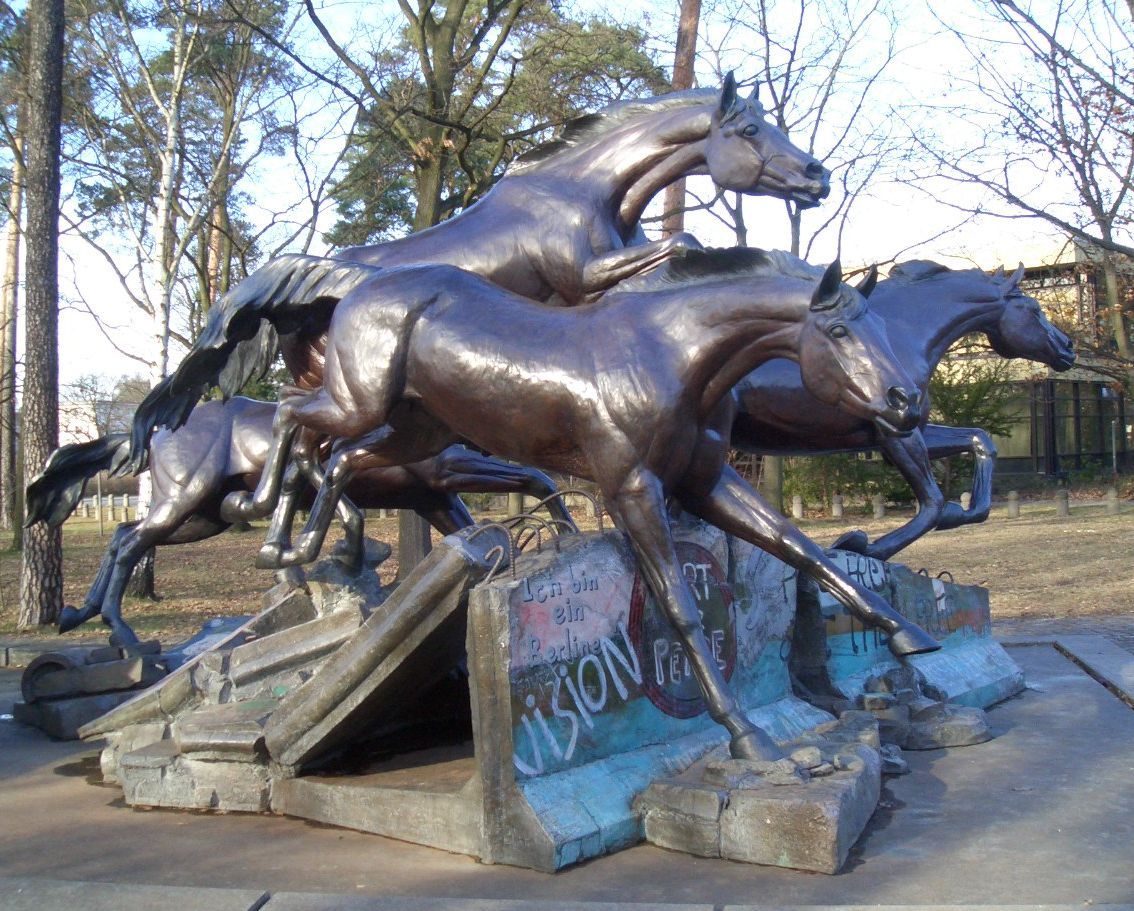
The Day the Wall Came Down (1998) is in Clayallee, Berlin-Zehlendorf, near the Allied Museum

The Day the Wall Came Down are two sculptures by Veryl Goodnight honoring the spontaneous end of the Berlin Wall on November 9, 1989. It depicts five horses leaping over actual pieces of the broken wall.

There are two copies of the sculpture.

One, sculpted in 1996, was initially installed at Stone Mountain Park near Atlanta, Georgia for the 1996 Olympic Games. It was moved in 1997 and is now exhibited on the grounds of the George H. W. Bush Presidential Library in College Station, Texas.

The second, finished in 1998, was given as a gift from the United States to Germany, and is located at Clayallee near the Allied Museum in the former American sector of Berlin. Each sculpture weighs approximately seven tons and measures 30 feet (9.1 m) long by 18 feet (5.5 m) wide by 12 feet (3.7 m) high.

== See also ==
- List of Berlin Wall segments
