= Veryl Goodnight =

Colorado sculptor and painter (born 1947)

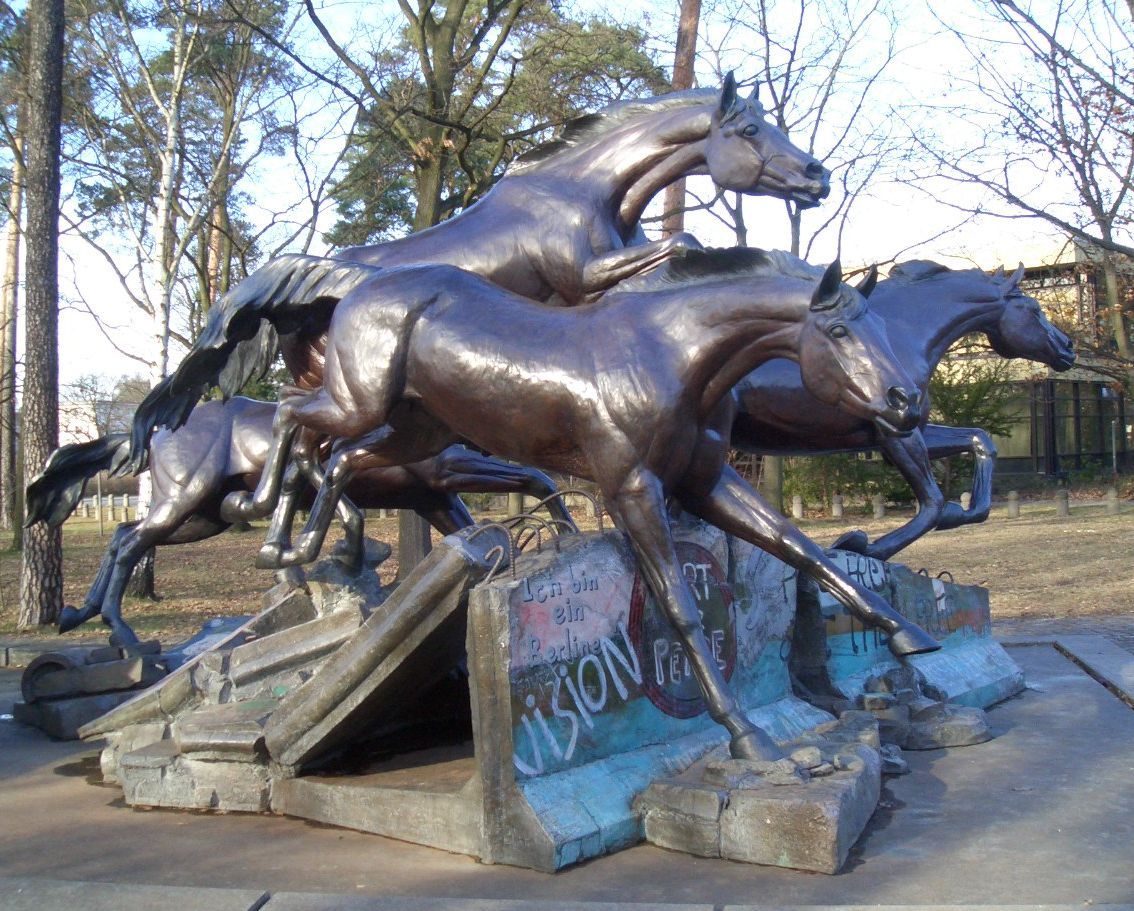
Veryl Goodnight: The Day the Wall Came Down, 1998 copy in Clayallee, Berlin-Zehlendorf near Allied Museum

Veryl Goodnight (born January 26, 1947) is a sculptor and painter who since 2006 has been living in Mancos, Colorado. She is known for her equine sculpture - in particular a realistic depiction of horses, often in an American West context. She was inducted into the National Cowgirl Museum and Hall of Fame in Fort Worth, Texas, in 2016.

Goodnight is best known for her 1996 and 1998 statues The Day the Wall Came Down.

== Early life ==
Veryl was born in Ashland, Ohio, on January 26, 1947, but her family moved to Lakewood, Colorado, when she was only a few weeks old. As a young child living in the West, she fell in love with horses. Her parents could not afford to buy her one of her own, but Veryl continued to think and dream about horses. When she was very little she would sculpt horses out of snow. She received from her parents her first set of professional paints when she was in third grade, and soon her home was filled with equine drawings and paintings.

== Education ==
In 1965, Veryl had the opportunity for a scholarship to study art at the University of Colorado at Boulder, but declined because she did not wish to study abstract art, which was the predominant form being taught at that time. She attended business school in Denver instead. During her 20s she held a steady job as a secretary while she continued to study art in her spare time. Her mentors included artists James Disney, Ned Jacob, Ken Bunn, and Jon Zahourek. She learned painting, bronze sculpture, and horse anatomy and began making and selling sculptures for a living.

== The Day the Wall Came Down ==
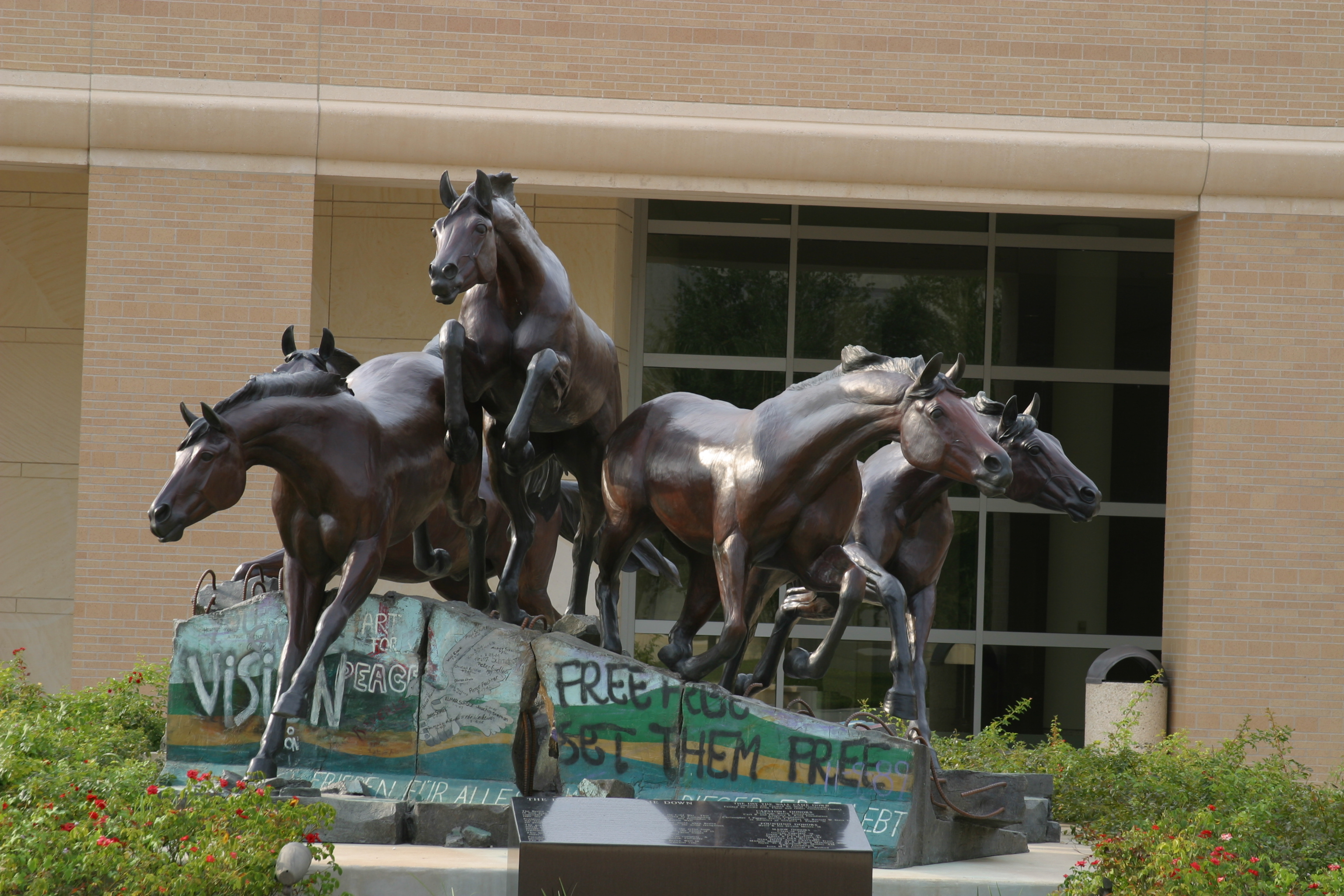
The Day the Wall Came Down, 1996, at the George Bush Presidential Library in College Station, Texas

She is best known for her 1996 sculpture The Day the Wall Came Down, a tribute to the fall of the Berlin Wall. It features five horses jumping over the rubble of the Berlin Wall.

There are two copies of the sculpture. The first, finished in 1996, is located at the George Bush Presidential Library in College Station, Texas.

The second, finished in 1998, was given as a gift from the United States of America to Germany and is located at Clayallee near the Allied Museum in the former American sector of Berlin. Each sculpture weighs approximately seven tons and measures 30 feet long by 18 feet wide by 12 feet high.

== Exposition in museums and open air ==
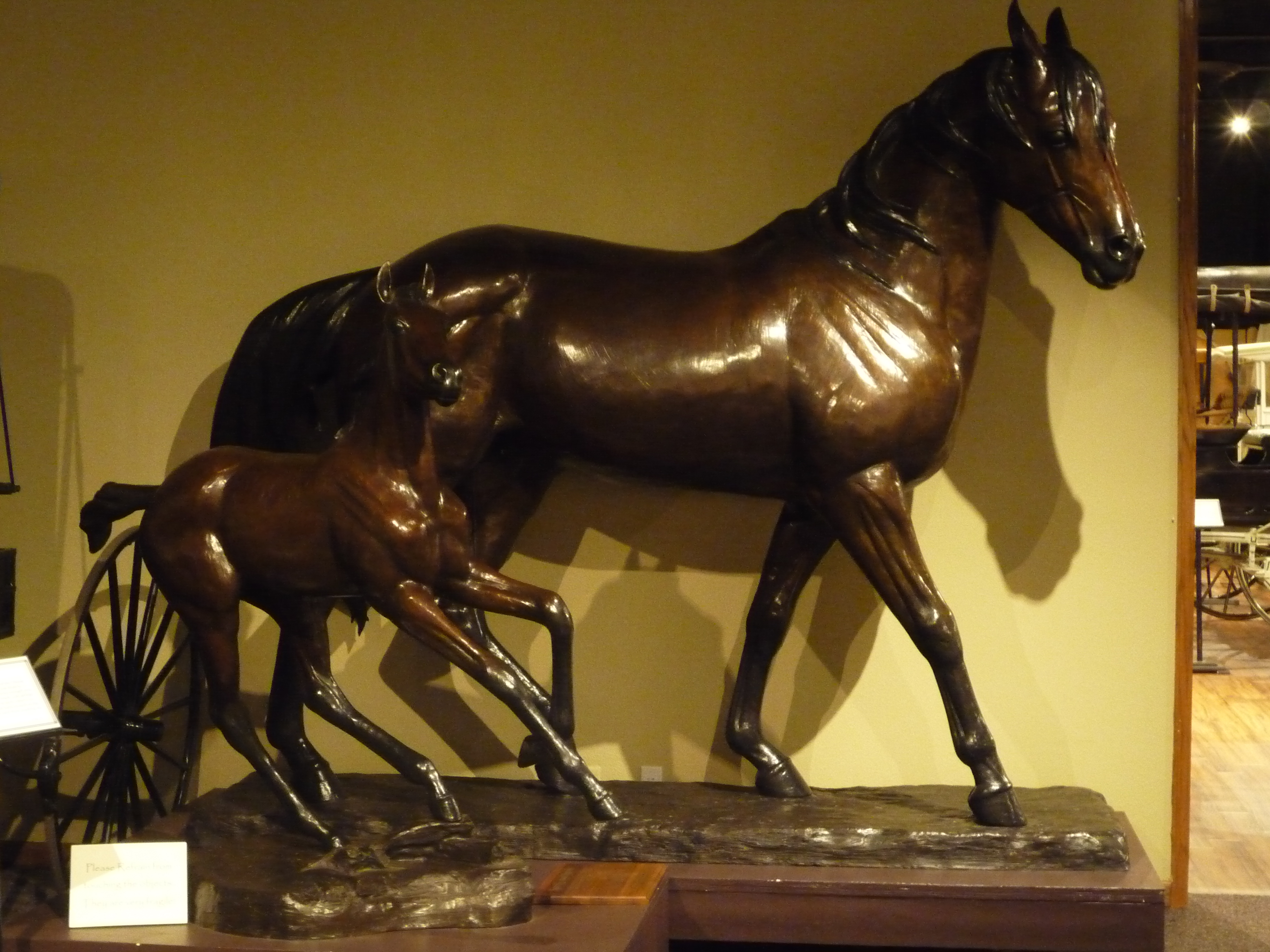
Spring and Sprite in the Old West Museum, Cheyenne, Wyoming

Goodnight's work is presented in many public collections, e. g.

- The Wildlife Experience in Parker, Colorado
- J. Wayne Stark Galleries
- Great Plains Art Museum

Other monuments created by Veryl "are on display at The Cowboy Hall of Fame Museum in Oklahoma City; the Houston Astrodome; Brookgreen Gardens, Murrells Inlet, South Carolina; Pro Rodeo Hall of Fame Museum in Colorado Springs, Colorado; Miyama Building, Tokyo, Japan; Lely Resort in Naples, Florida; and The Old West Museum in Cheyenne, Wyoming."

== Exhibits and professional organizations ==
- 2016 Inductee National Cowgirl Hall of Fame
- Elected Fellow of National Sculpture Society
- Member of the American Academy of Equine Art, Inc
- Participating artist of Masters of the American West
- Invited Artist of the Northwest Rendezvous Group
- Signature member of The Society of Animal Artists

== Books ==
Goodnight has published a biography: No Turning Back: The Art of Veryl Goodnight.

== External references ==
Media related to Veryl Goodnight at Wikimedia Commons

- Official website
