= Allied Museum =

Museum in Berlin

Coordinates: 52°27′21″N 13°16′21″E

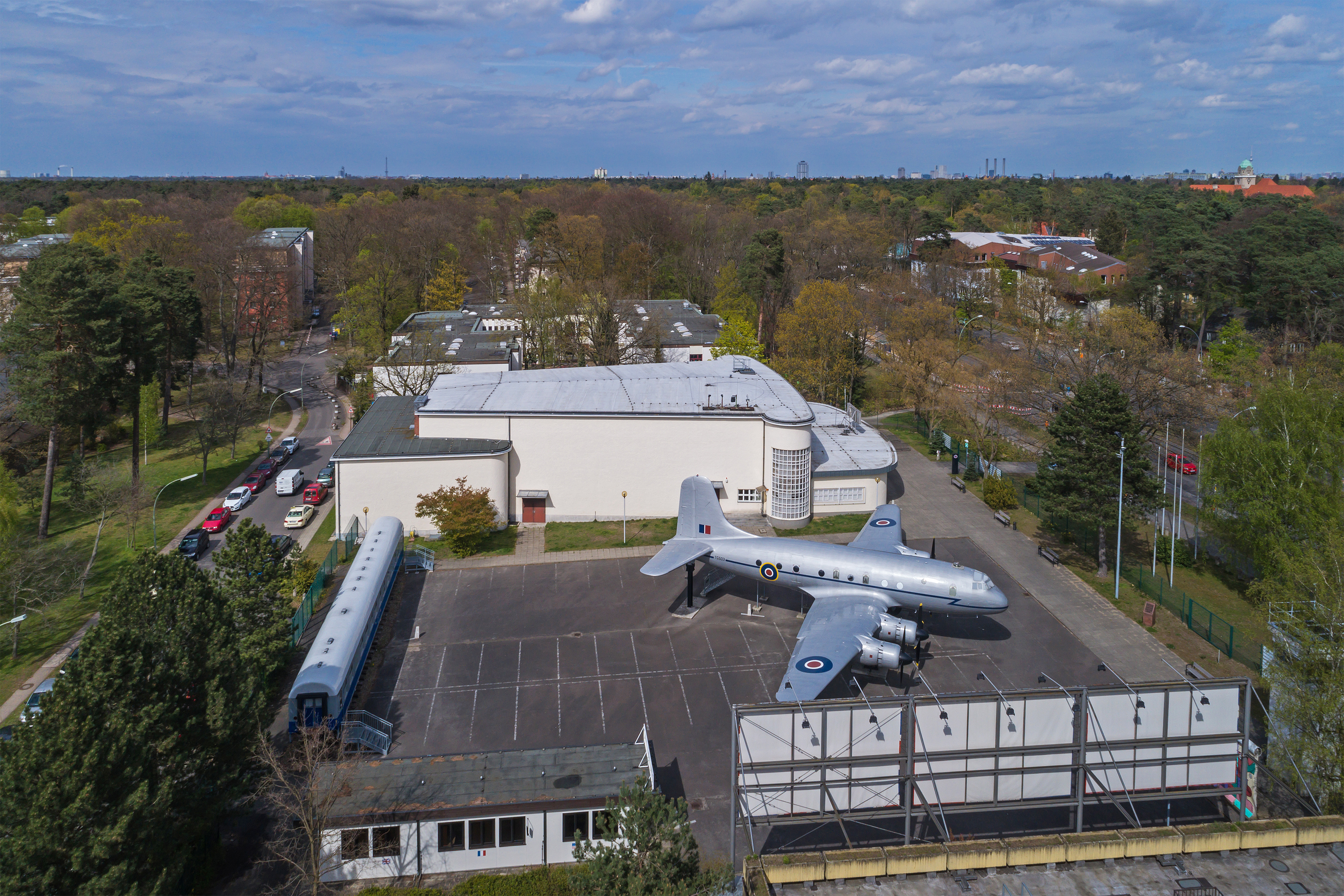
The Allied Museum

Allied Museum, Berlin

The Allied Museum (German: AlliiertenMuseum) is a museum in Berlin. It documents the political history and the military commitments and roles of the Western Allies (US, France and the United Kingdom) in Germany – particularly Berlin – between 1945 and 1994 and their contribution to liberty in Berlin during the Cold War era.

== Location: American Sector ==
The museum is located on Clayallee, an arterial road named after General Lucius D. Clay (1898–1978), in the Dahlem quarter of the southwestern Steglitz-Zehlendorf borough. Until German reunification in 1990, the area was located in the American sector of postwar West Berlin. The buildings near the US Army headquarters then housed an American movie theater, called Outpost, and the Nicholson Memorial Library. The museum was inaugurated in 1998, on the fiftieth anniversary of the Berlin airlift, in the presence of Chancellor Helmut Kohl. Entrance is free.

Since the closure of Berlin Tempelhof Airport in 2008, the Allied Museum has announced its interest in relocating to the old airport at some point.

== The Allies ==
Four sectors of occupied Berlin

The museum shows an important part of the military and political scenery of the Cold War in Berlin, from immediately after World War II and the final disengagement of the Allied forces in the 1990s.

The early period of partition plans evolved by the European Advisory Commission is documented. When in February 1945, the United States, United Kingdom, and Soviet Union decided to split the former German Reich into occupation zones at the Yalta Conference, including a fourth area assigned to the French, the German capital likewise was divided into four sectors. In late April, Soviet Red Army troops fought their way into the city during the Battle of Berlin and enforced the unconditional surrender by the German Wehrmacht armed forces. In Summer they pulled out from the city's Western sectors according to the agreements concluded.

In the beginning East-West conflict, first marked by the withdrawal of the Soviet representatives from the Allied Kommandatura and the following Berlin Blockade in 1948–49, the US, UK and France formed the Western Allies and came in opposition to the Soviet occupation forces. The increasing tensions culminated in the Berlin Crisis of 1961 and the building of the Berlin Wall. A significant step towards the easing of tensions was made in the 1971 Four Power Agreement on Berlin, until the "Berlin question" was solved after the East German Peaceful Revolution and the fall of the Berlin Wall on 9 November 1989.

== Exhibition ==
=== Outpost Theater: From victory to airlift ===
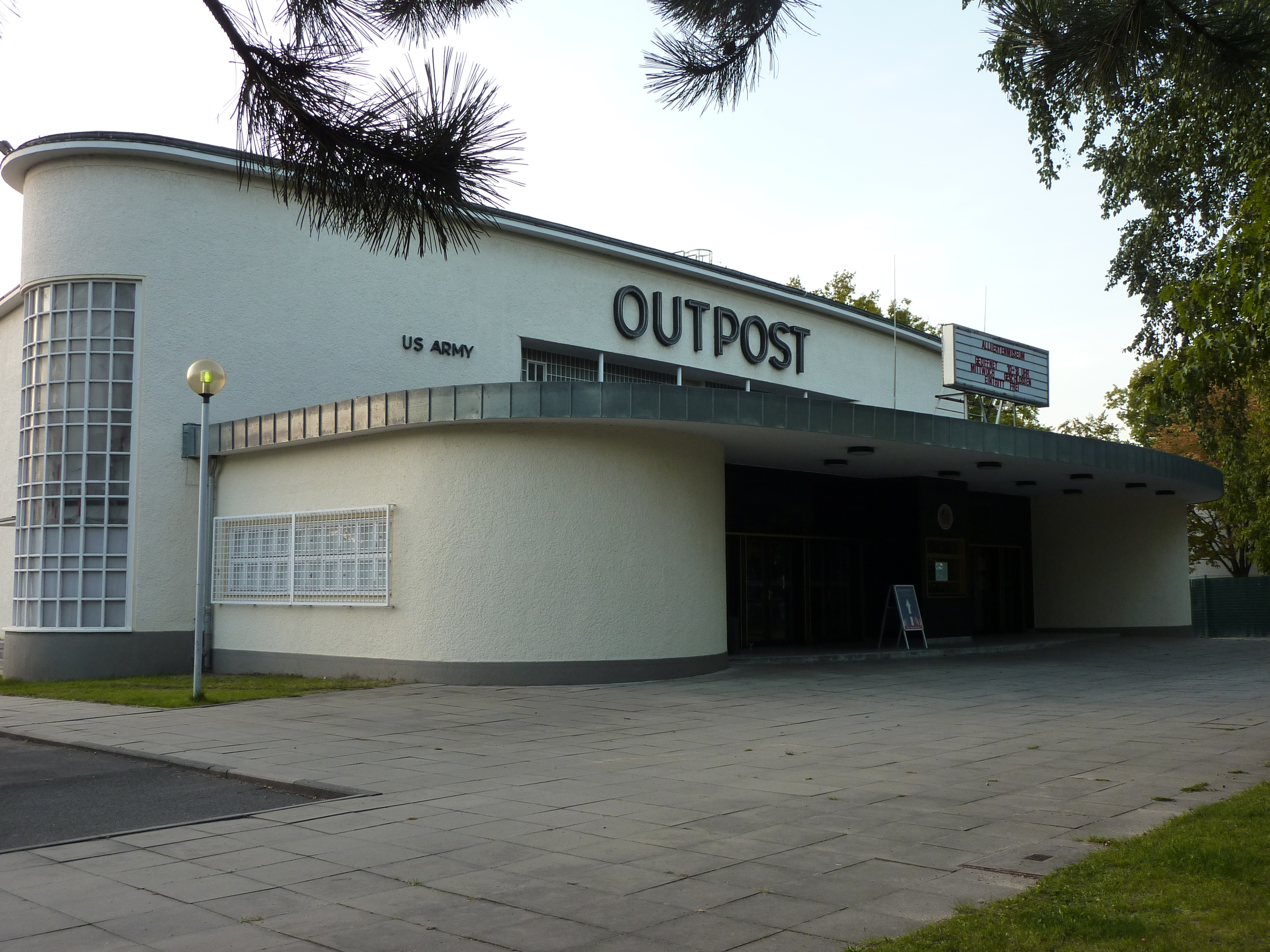
Outpost theater

The former movie theater, a protected monument built in 1953, houses a collection of Berlin maps with planned sectors, pictures of Red Army forces marching into Berlin, uniforms, the first post-war editions of Berlin newspapers, denazification documents, CARE packages. Particular emphasis is on logistics and sacrifices of life by the British-American airlift to West Berlin. Lectures and screenings are held regularly.

=== Open-Air: Aircraft and watchtower ===
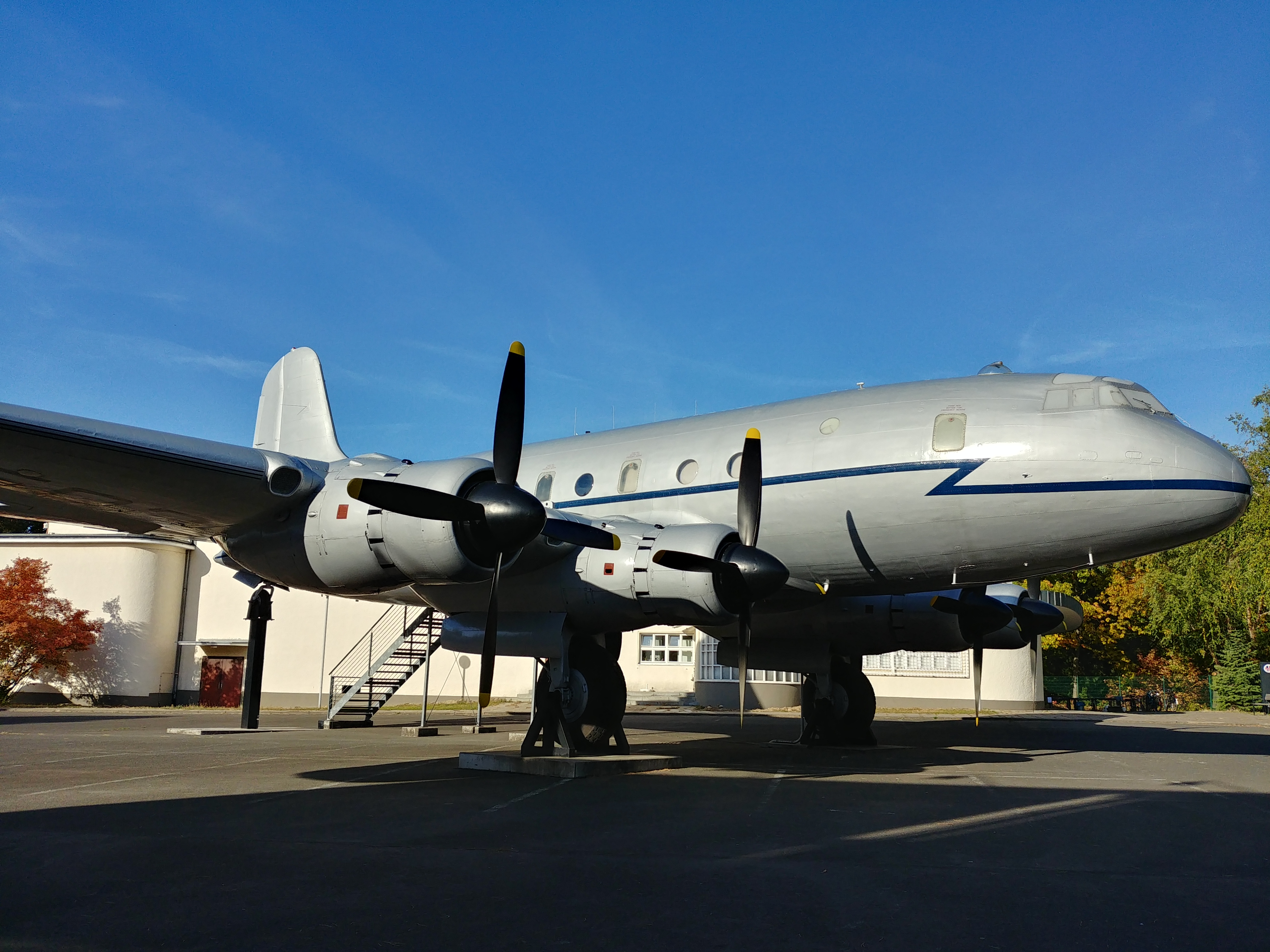
Handley Page Hastings which was used in the Berlin Airlift

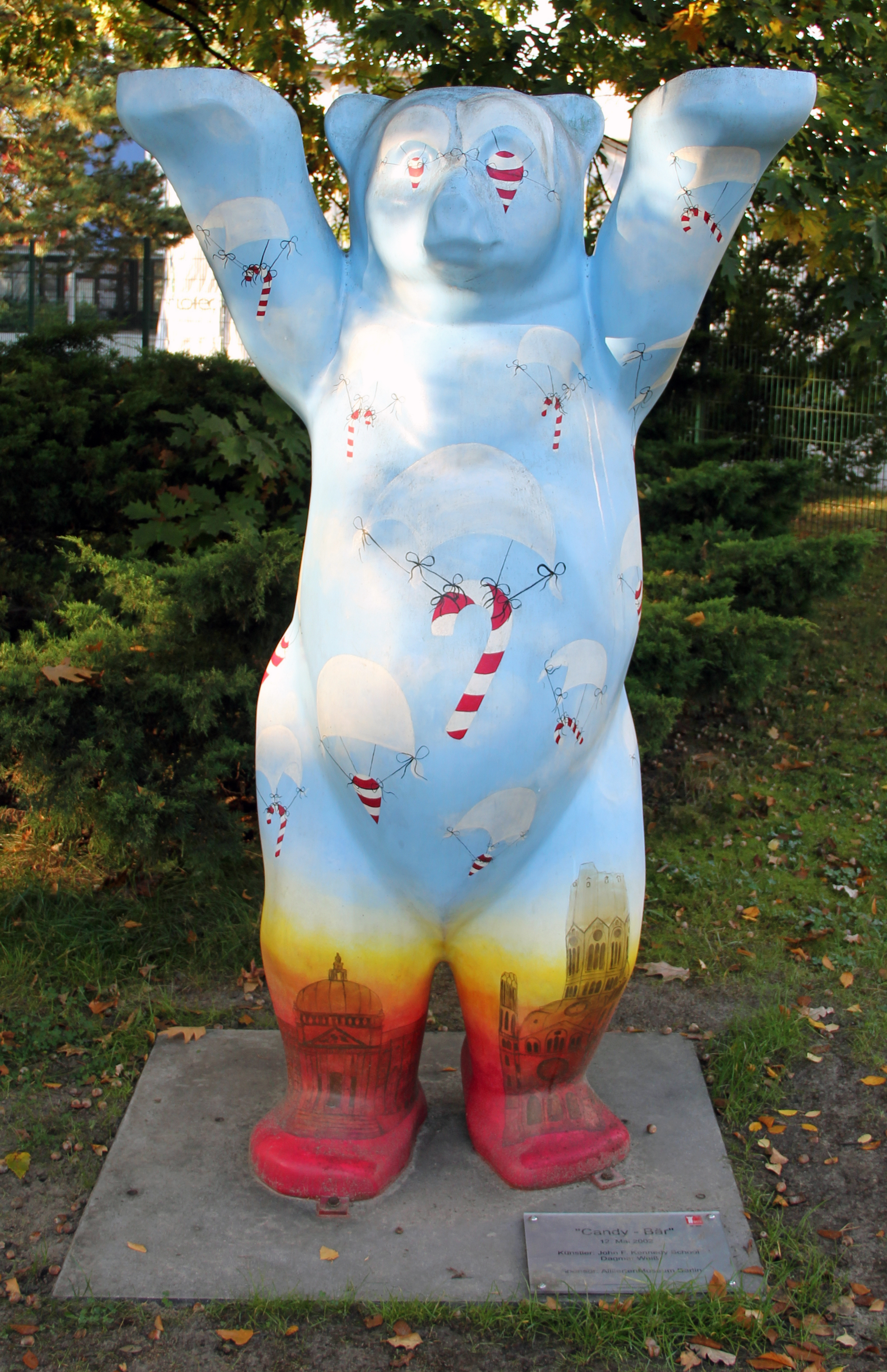
Buddy Bear in front of the museum

Some of the largest objects in the permanent collection are presented in the open-air exhibition space and include a Handley Page Hastings transport plane deployed by the Royal Air Force in the Berlin airlift, a railway carriage from a French military train, the last guard house from the famous Berlin Checkpoint Charlie border crossing, and a rebuilt East German watchtower.

=== Nicholson Memorial Library: Privileged position of Berlin ===
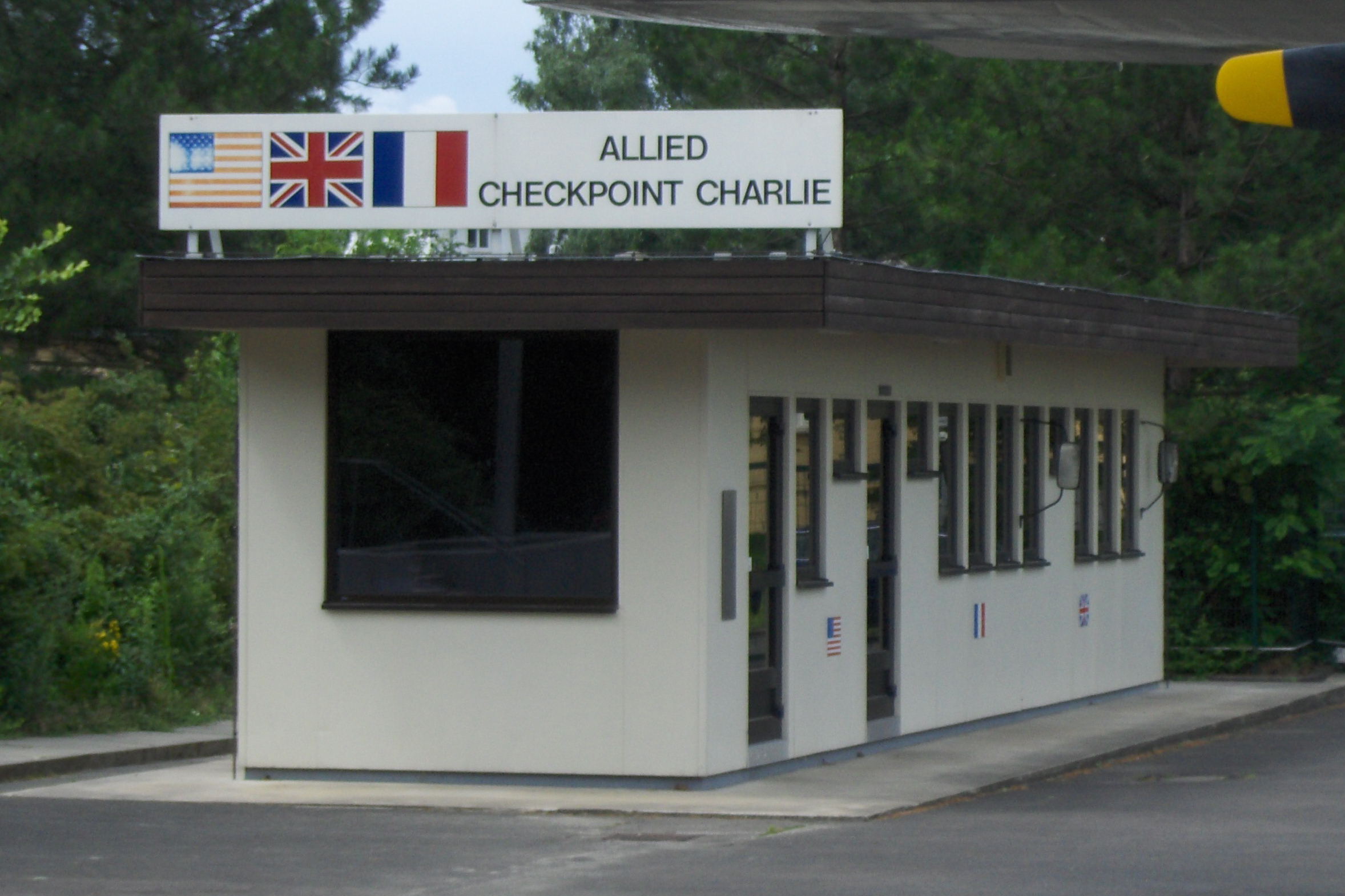
Original Checkpoint Charlie building at the museum

In the former library building, documents are shown concerning every-day life of the Allied garrisons, the political situation under Cold War terms until the fall of the Wall, as well as methods to analyze the measures by the USA, Great Britain and France to maintain control in West Berlin. The collections include the reconstruction of an espionage tunnel built during the Operation Gold conducted by the American and British intelligence services in 1955. Part of the hall is reserved for temporary exhibitions on themes of modern-day relevance.

== Organization ==
The Allied Museum has the legal status of a non-profit association, whose members are the Federal Republic of Germany, the state of Berlin, France, the UK and the US, as well as the Deutsches Historisches Museum, and the Institut für Zeitgeschichte in Munich.

== Sculpture The Day the Wall Came Down ==
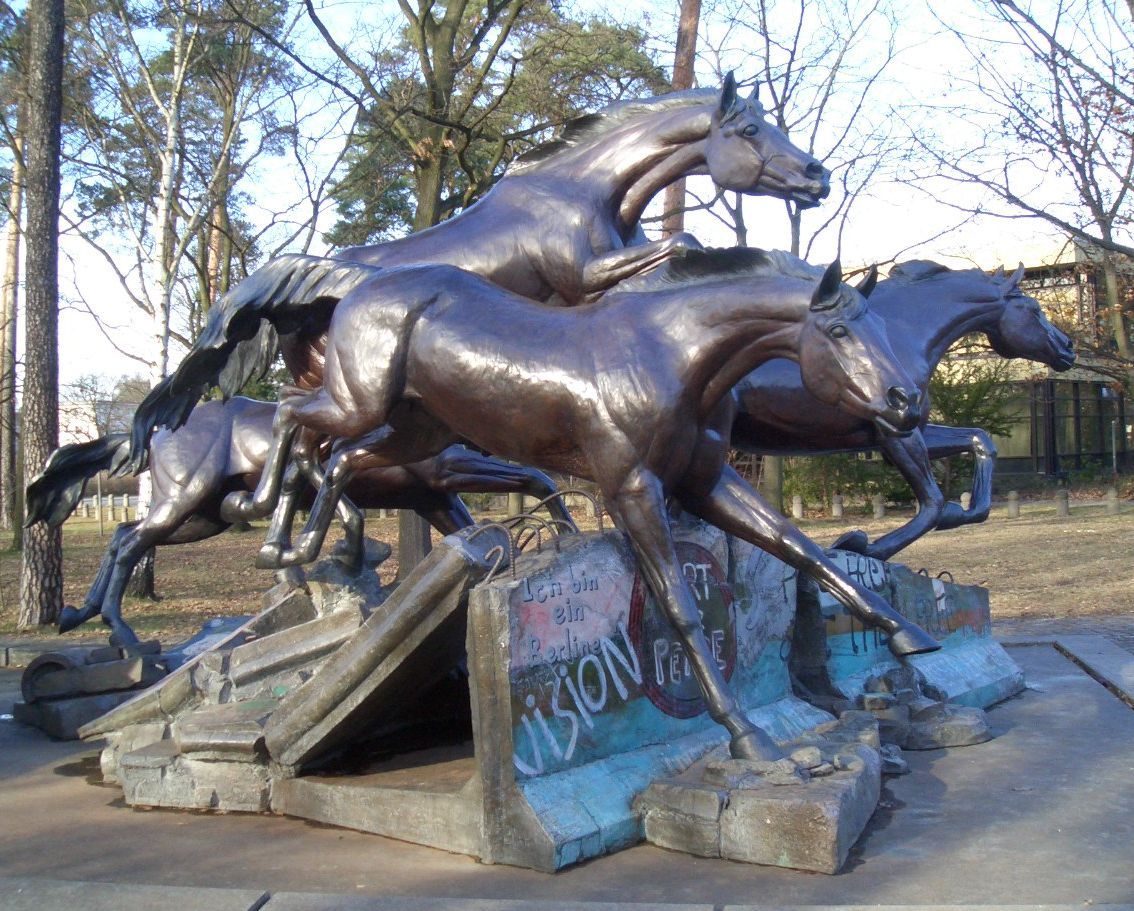
The Day the Wall Came Down, 1998 sculpture by Veryl Goodnight in Clayallee, Berlin-Zehlendorf near Allied Museum

Near the Allied Museum, in Clayallee, the 1998 sculpture The Day the Wall Came Down by Veryl Goodnight remembers the joyous event of November 9, 1989, when the Berlin Wall was effectively neutralized. Five wild horses are shown jumping over actual remains of the wall. A statue of General Friedrich Wilhelm von Steuben stands nearby.

== See also ==
- German-Russian Museum - the communist version of this museum
- List of museums and galleries in Berlin

== Notes ==
- Durie, William (2012). The British Garrison Berlin 1945 - 1994: nowhere to go ... a pictorial historiography of the British Military occupation / presence in Berlin. Berlin: Vergangenheitsverlag (de). ISBN 978-3-86408-068-5. OCLC 978161722.
