= Lyman Byxbe =

American artist

- Born: 1886; Pittsfield, Illinois, U.S.
- Died: 1980 (aged 93–94); Longmont, Colorado, U.S.
- Occupation: Artist

Lyman Byxbe (1886–1980) was an American artist. He was primarily an etcher, and he spent much of his life in Nebraska.
