= George H. W. Bush Presidential Library and Museum =

American library and museum

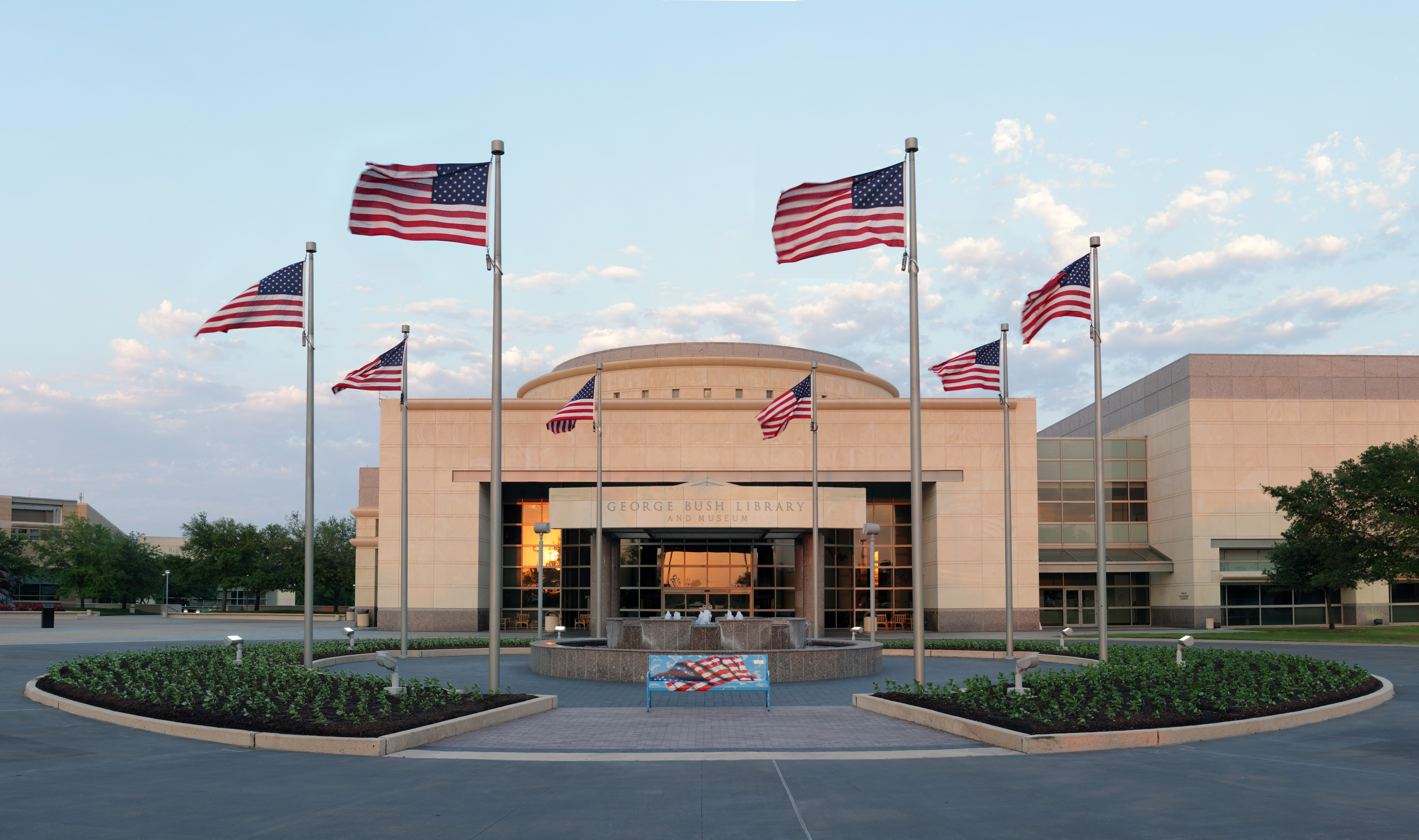
- George H. W. Bush Presidential Library and Museum in 2011

- Location within Texas Location within the United States

General information
- Location: College Station, Texas, U.S.
- Coordinates: 30°35′48″N 96°21′12″W
- Named for: George H. W. Bush
- Inaugurated: Dedicated on November 6, 1997; 28 years ago Rededicated on November 10, 2007; 18 years ago
- Cost: $43 million

Technical details
- Size: 69,049 square feet (6,400 m^{2})

Design and construction
- Architect: Hellmuth, Obata and Kassabaum

Website
- www.bush41.org

The George H. W. Bush Presidential Library and Museum is the presidential library and burial site of George H. W. Bush, the 41st president of the United States (1989–1993), and his wife Barbara Bush. Located on a 90-acre (360,000 m^{2}) site on the west campus of Texas A&M University at 1000 George Bush Drive West in College Station, Texas, the library is one of 15 administered by the National Archives and Records Administration (NARA). The library contains more than 2 million photographs, 10,000 videotapes, and 1,000 audiotapes, mostly related to Bush's service as vice president and president.

== Description ==
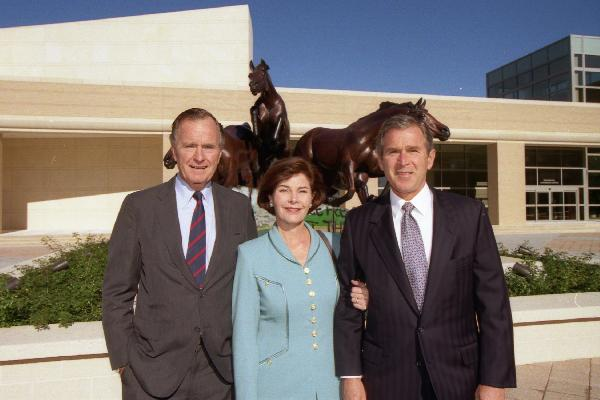
Former president George H. W. Bush (left) with his son then-Texas governor, and later president, George W. Bush (right) and daughter-in-law Laura (center) at the dedication of the library

The George H. W. Bush Presidential Library was dedicated on November 6, 1997, as the George Bush Presidential Library and Museum, opening to the public shortly thereafter, and was designed by the architectural firm of Hellmuth, Obata + Kassabaum.

Situated on a plaza adjoining the Annenberg Presidential Conference Center and the George Bush School of Government and Public Service, the library is administered by NARA under the provisions of the Presidential Libraries Act of 1955.

The mission of the George H. W. Bush Presidential Library is to preserve and make available for research the official records, personal papers, and artifacts of President George H. W. Bush, to support democracy, promote civic education, and increase historical understanding of U.S. national experience through the life and times of George H. W. Bush.

The textual archives contain more than 44 million pages of personal papers and official documents subject to the Presidential Records Act, as well as personal records from associates connected with President Bush's public career as Congressman, Ambassador to the United Nations, Chief of the U.S. Liaison Office in China, Chairman of the Republican National Committee, and Director of the Central Intelligence Agency. As in all NARA presidential libraries, records are housed in acid-free storage (Hollinger) boxes in a balanced humidity and temperature atmosphere. The archival storage area houses 13,000 cubic feet (370 m^{3}) of records, and the library has a National Security vault holding 3,500 cubic feet (99 m^{3}) of Presidential Records. In addition to memoranda, speeches, and reports found in the textual collection, there is an extensive audio-visual and photographic archive.

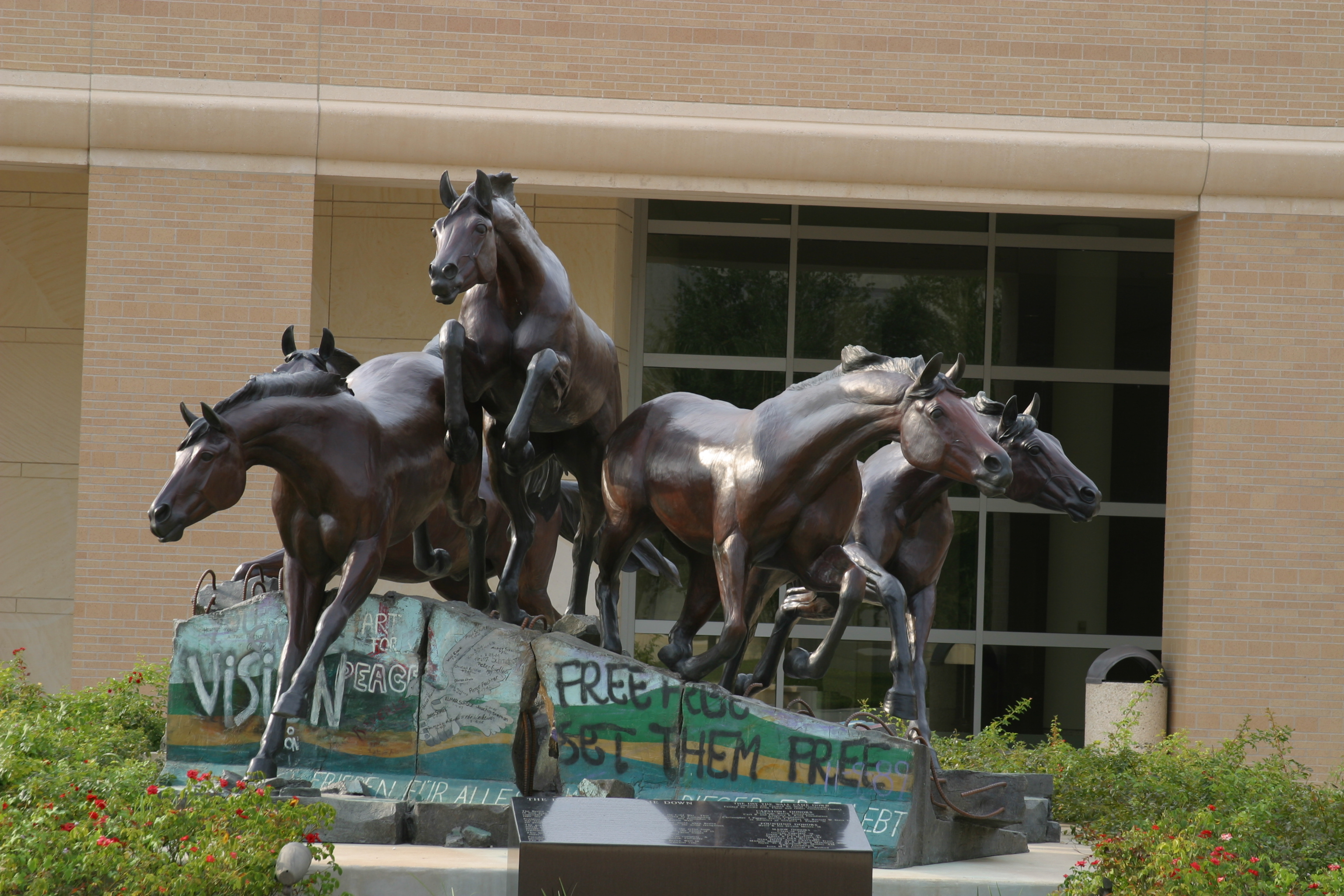
The Day the Wall Came Down by Veryl Goodnight, a 1996 statue of horses leaping over pieces of the actual Berlin Wall, stands on the plaza of the library and depicts the fall of the wall in 1989, when Bush was president.

The museum has just under 17,000 square feet (1,600 m^{2}) of permanent exhibit space and 3,000 square feet (300 m^{2}) of temporary exhibit space. Permanent exhibits draw on the best of the museum collection to visually convey the essence of George Bush's life and public service career and to illustrate historical events of this period in American history. Changing exhibits explore topics on the Bush Administration, American history, American presidents, and other related topics.

In 2011, the George Bush Presidential Library Foundation was given an overall score of 2 out of 4 by Charity Navigator. The CEO was listed on that site's "10 Highly Paid CEOs at Low-Rated Charities". It was renamed when George W. Bush opened his own Presidential library in 2013, to distinguish between then.

== Renovations and expansion ==
On April 23, 2007, the permanent exhibit closed for complete renovation (though the temporary exhibit gallery remained open, hosting the popular "Traveling White House in Miniature" exhibit). The museum reopened November 10, 2007, with a ceremony during which the former president arrived via parachute jump. The permanent exhibit now features (like many other presidential libraries), a replica of the Oval Office; unlike those other presidential libraries, visitors are able to fully enter the replica, sit behind the president's desk, and have a souvenir photo taken.

On November 8, 2019, the Union Pacific Railroad donated its EMD SD70ACe locomotive #4141 to the library, where it will be on permanent display in the pavilion. The exhibit opened in 2024 and is placed between the library and the Annenberg Presidential Conference Center. Unveiled on October 18, 2005, in honor of Bush, it remained in active service until 2009, and later was brought back to participate in Bush's funeral train on December 6, 2018. It subsequently remained in active service following the funeral until its last run between November 8 and November 9, as part of the Union Pacific 4014 Southwest Tour, in which the plans for the display were unveiled. 4141 returned to the presidential library on March 12, 2021.

In addition to UP 4141, the Bush Foundation is also seeking to have a retired Boeing VC-25A and a Sikorsky UH-60 Black Hawk displayed on the library grounds, of which the UH-60 Black Hawk has been confirmed for permanent display.

On December 2, 2019, a life-size bronze statue of Sully, the president's service dog during his final six months, was unveiled at the site.

== George Bush Award ==
The Presidential Library Foundation also awards the George Bush Award for Excellence in Public Service, which "recognizes an individual's or group's dedication to public service at the local, state, national or international levels". The recipients are given a crystal sculpture designed by Eric Hilton, comprising a "three panel prismatic column of crystal. In the center of the column is a shallow lens engraving of the world." The winners are:

Recipients of George Bush Award for Excellence in Public Service
Year	Recipient
2000	Helmut Kohl
2001	Mikhail Gorbachev
2003	Edward M. Kennedy
2004	Arnold Schwarzenegger
2006	Billy Graham
2007	Robert M. Gates
2011	Ronald Reagan
2013	Moza bint Nasser
2016	Bob Dole
2018	Brian Mulroney
2019	John Major

== Burials ==
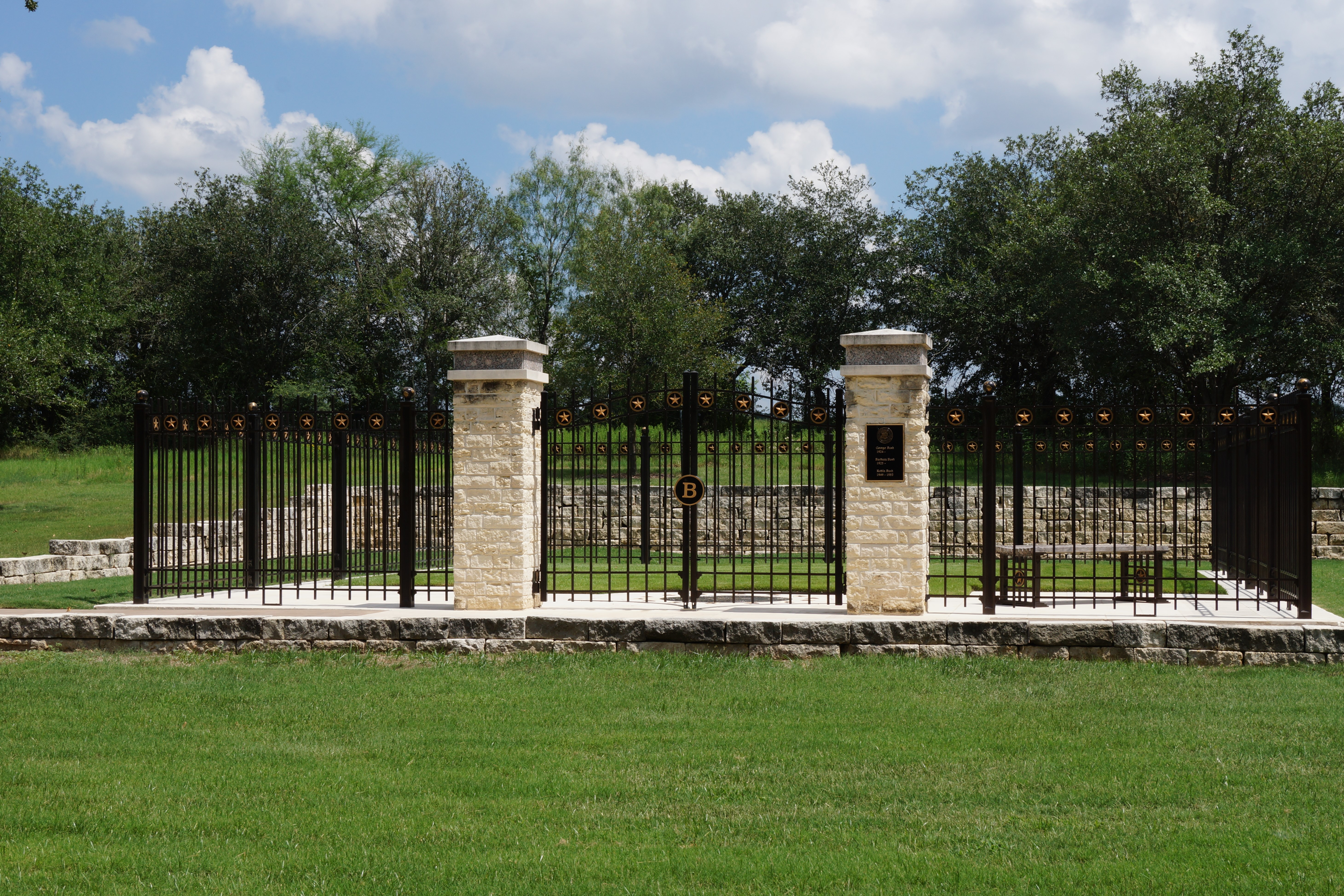
Burial site in 2016

The library is also the burial site of President George H.W. Bush, his wife Barbara, and their infant daughter Pauline Robinson Bush (Robin) (1949–1953). Robin is buried between President Bush and Barbara.

Robin was originally buried at Putnam Cemetery in Greenwich, Connecticut, but she was re-buried at the library in 2000.

Barbara Bush was buried on April 21, 2018, following her death on April 17.

George H. W. Bush was buried on December 6, 2018, following his death on November 30.

== See also ==
- Presidential Records Act
- MSC Student Conference on National Affairs
- George W. Bush Presidential Center
- Presidential memorials in the United States
- List of burial places of presidents and vice presidents of the United States
