= Parforceheide =

Forest in Germany

Coordinates: 52°22′00″N 13°09′30″E

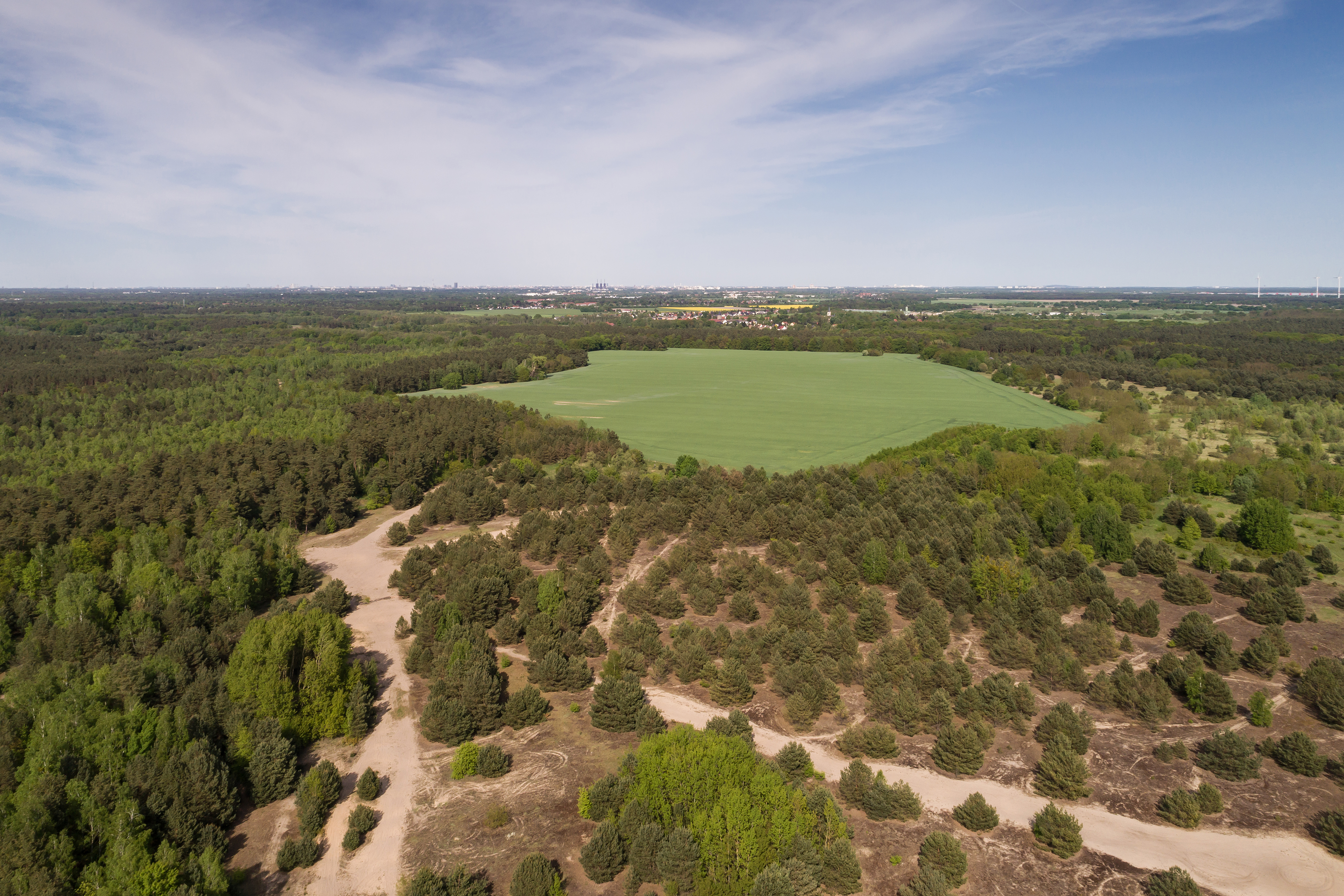
Aerial view

The Parforceheide between the south of Berlin and the east of Potsdam is one of the last large contiguous forest areas in the Berlin-Brandenburg metropolitan region. Although located in Brandenburg, part of the forest is owned by the state of Berlin. The basis for this was created by the permanent forest contract or century contract of 1915. An area covering around 2350 hectares has been designated as the Parforceheide landscape conservation area since 1997. One of the aims of the conservation order is to preserve "the area's function as a climatic compensation area in the south of the Berlin conurbation". The name goes back to the par force hunts for which King Frederick William I of Prussia had the Stern hunting lodge built in the forest in 1730.

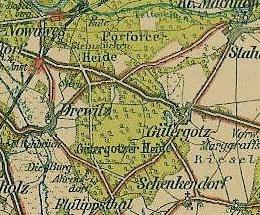
Pharus plan from 1903, detail

== Geography and geology ==
=== Location ===
Until the beginning of the 20th century, the northern boundary of the Parforceheide was formed by the Bäkefließ, which was largely absorbed into the Teltow Canal. The historical map from 1903 next to the table of contents still shows the Bäkefließ (with its old name Teltefließ) at the top of the picture. Since its construction between 1900 and 1906, the Teltow Canal has closed off the forest to the north, followed even further north on the other side of the canal by the forests of Dreilinden. Between the Teltow Canal and the forest to the east is the narrow Berlin strip of Albrecht's Teerofen, which extends into Brandenburg here, so that a narrow strip of forest along the canal lies on Berlin territory.

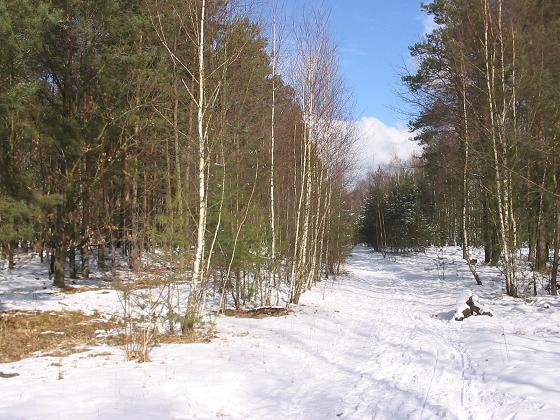
Forest stand with 80-85% pine trees and some birch trees

To the east, the woodland is bordered by the extensive parkland of the Südwestkirchhof Stahnsdorf (Stahnsdorf South-Western Cemetery) and the Wilmersdorfer Waldfriedhof Stahnsdorf, whose area was part of the Parforceheide until the cemeteries were established in 1909 and 1920 respectively. On the other hand, the only village in the immediate vicinity of the forest, Güterfelde, the former Gütergotz, borders the Parforceheide to the east. The Güterfelder Heide marked on some maps is assigned to the par force heath by the responsible forestry office in Nudow.

The western boundary is formed by the road that connects Berlin with the former exclave of Steinstücken, which still belongs to Berlin today.

To the west of Steinstücken are the Potsdam development areas of Drewitz, Am Stern and Kirchsteigfeld; from Stern, the western boundary runs parallel to the A 115 highway. The highway cuts through the forest, which is connected by two pedestrian bridges over the roadway; a new rest area built in 2004 on the A 115 is called Parforceheide. The southern end of the forest area is at the intersection of the Güterfelde-Philippsthal and Drewitz-Ludwigsfelde roads. Other smaller forest parcels lie outside the outlined boundary and are not specified here in more detail for the sake of clarity.

Worth mentioning is the almost 22-hectare Wüste Mark farmland, which lies in the middle of the Parforceheide and was farmed as an exclave by a Berlin farmer from Zehlendorf until 1988.

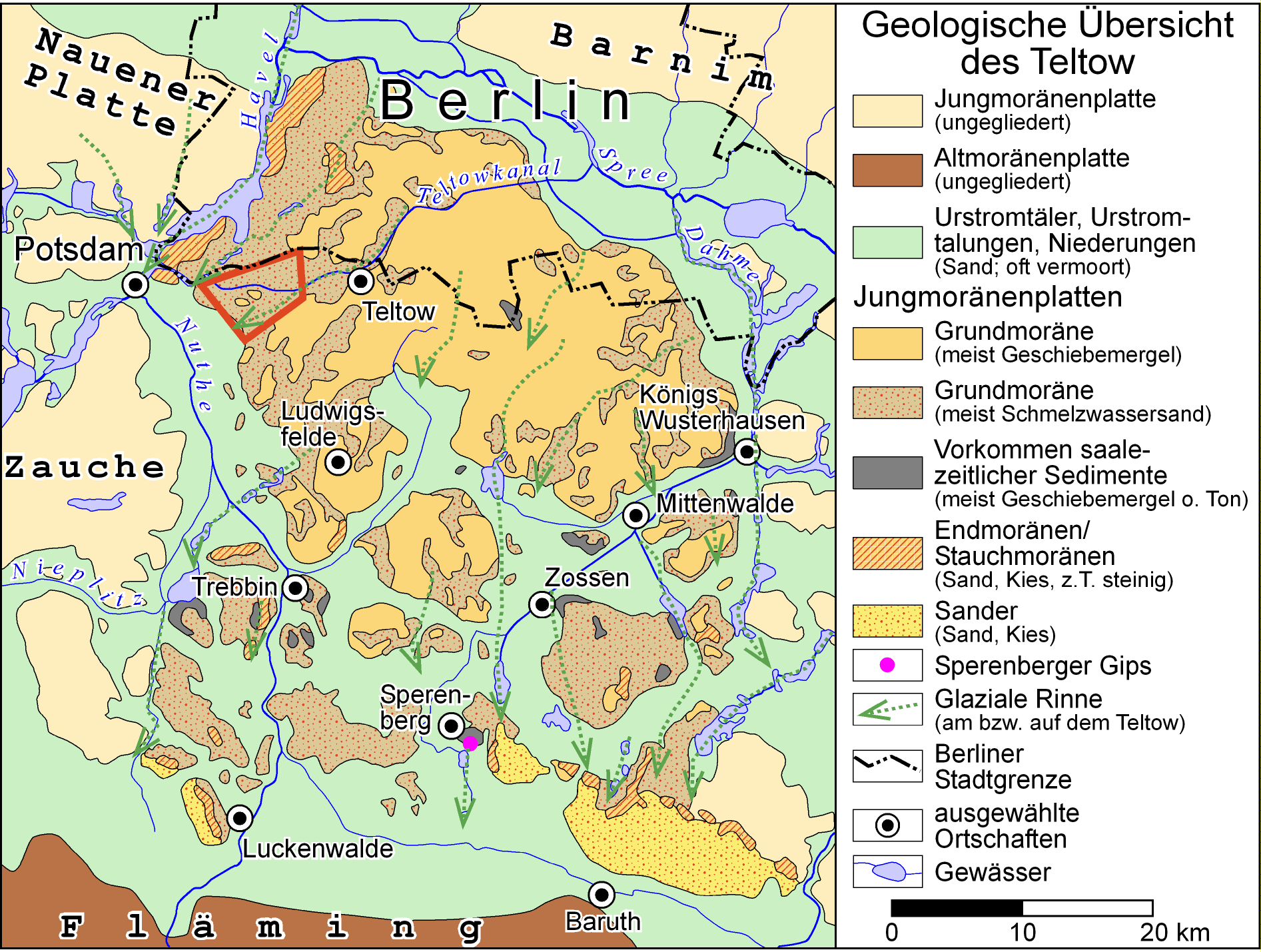
Geological overview of the Teltow with parforce heath (framed in red)

=== Ice age, sand and pine ===
The Parforceheide is geologically part of the Berlin-Brandenburg landscape of Teltow, whose name goes back to the original term "Telte" for the Bäke river. The Teltow is a typical plate north of the Brandenburg ice edge. It was formed just over 20,000 years ago during the Weichselian Ice Age. For the most part, it is occupied by flat undulating ground moraines. The special feature of the Parforceheide is that the boulder clay typical of ground moraines is largely absent and therefore older deposits, meltwater sands from the advance phase of the inland ice, are present on the surface. They are on average 15 to 20 meters thick. Brown soils developed on the sands in the post-glacial period, but these only have a low yield potential. The dry sandy soils typical of the Teltow shape the character of the Parforceheide forest, which has been given the name "Heide" (heath), which is only used in eastern Germany for forest locations far from groundwater. With its sparse stand of pine trees, the forest offered ideal conditions for King Frederick William I's need to cut the wide tracks through the wood required for par force hunting.

== History ==
=== Par force hunting and star ===
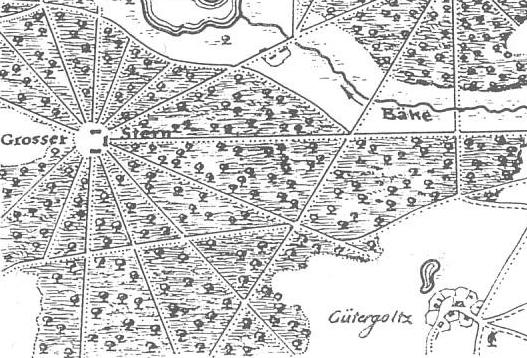
Historical map from 1780

Par force hunts, which have been practiced with passion at European courts since the 16th and 17th centuries, gave the par force hunt its name. This form of hunting requires paths that are as flat and clear as possible in a forest with as little undergrowth as possible, as the riders have to follow the packs of hounds that chase the game to exhaustion. This form of hunting is now prohibited in Germany and was even banned in England, a country with a particularly cherished hunting tradition and an influential hunting lobby, in 2005. Hunting in the Parforceheide was mainly for wild boar and, to a lesser extent, fallow deer. Red deer are said to have only existed in small numbers in the forests near Berlin even then.

The existing hunting grounds in Brandenburg were not suitable for this form of hunting. At the beginning of the 18th century, the "Soldier King" Frederick William I found an ideal area for par force hunting in the Parforceheide, as it has been known since that year, and had an area of around one hundred square kilometers prepared for par force hunting between 1725 and 1729. A central square was created around seven kilometers from the royal city palace, from which 16 dead-straight double tracks (racks) were cut into the forest in a star shape - with names such as Priestergestell, Breite Gestell, Turmgestell or Weg nach Kohlhasenbrück. This star still exists, but only eight radial paths or roads have been preserved. Today it belongs to the Potsdam district of Stern, which is named after it. In the past, it was also known as the Great Star - not to be confused with the Great Star of the same name on the Victory Column in Berlin.

=== Stern Hunting lodge ===
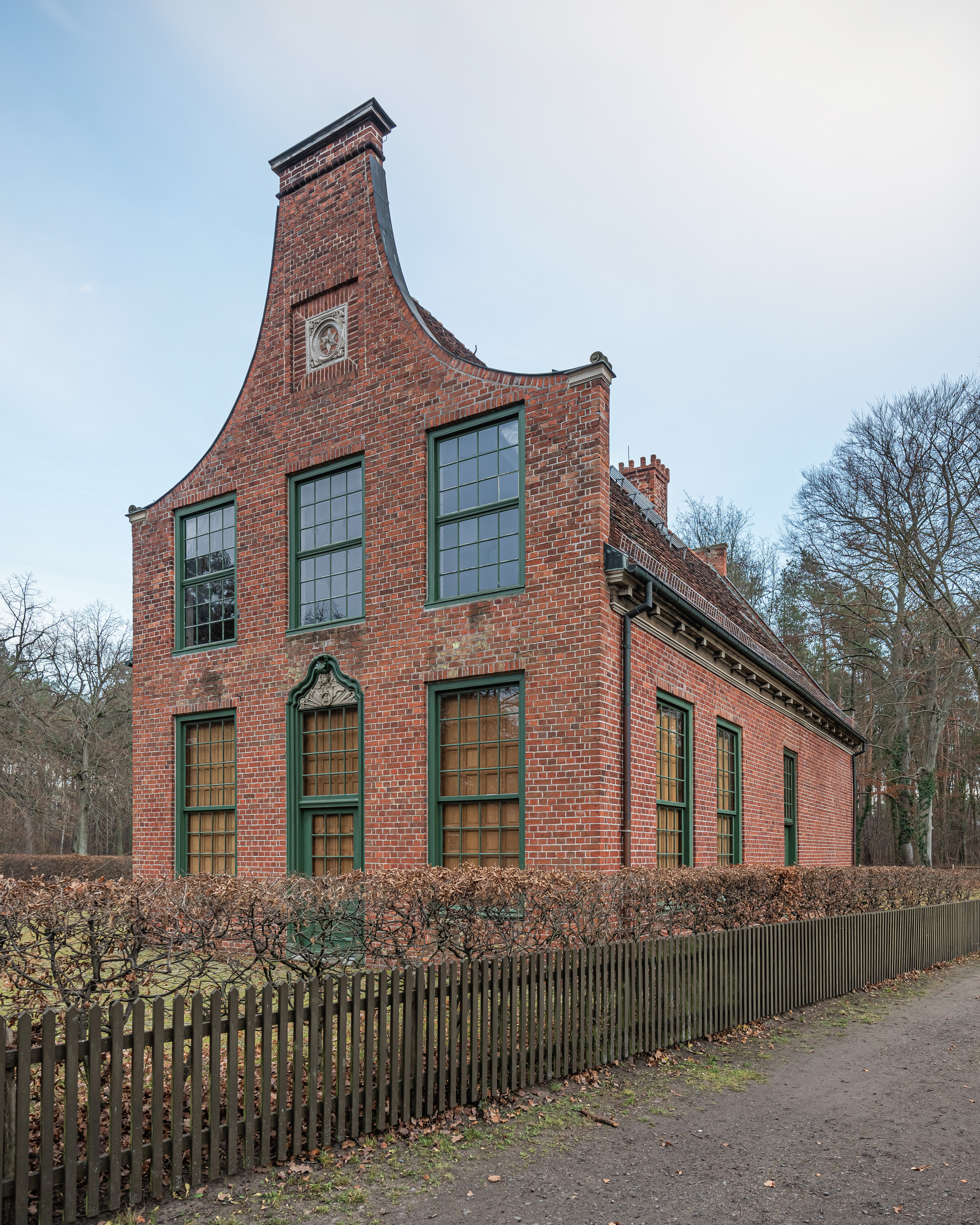
Stern Hunting lodge

The writer Theodor Fontane hiked through the Parforceheide via the Stern to Güterfelde in 1869:

From Kohlhasenbrück we take a southerly direction, meandering along footpaths through a well-kept copse and then enter a clearing from which we can see the racks radiating through the forest. This clearing is called the 'star'; in the middle of it, surrounded by a few acacias, is a hunting lodge of the same name.

— Theodor Fontane, Wanderungen durch die Mark Brandenburg

However, the Stern hunting lodge, which the Prussian monarch had built in the forest in 1730, is more of a small country house than a castle. According to Fontane, the house was

a Dutch building, square in red brick, with a gable in the front, a hunting horn above the door and an etched star in the center window. It consists only of a dining room, a kitchen and a bedroom, three rooms that have retained their character to this day.

— Theodor Fontane, Wanderungen durch die Mark Brandenburg

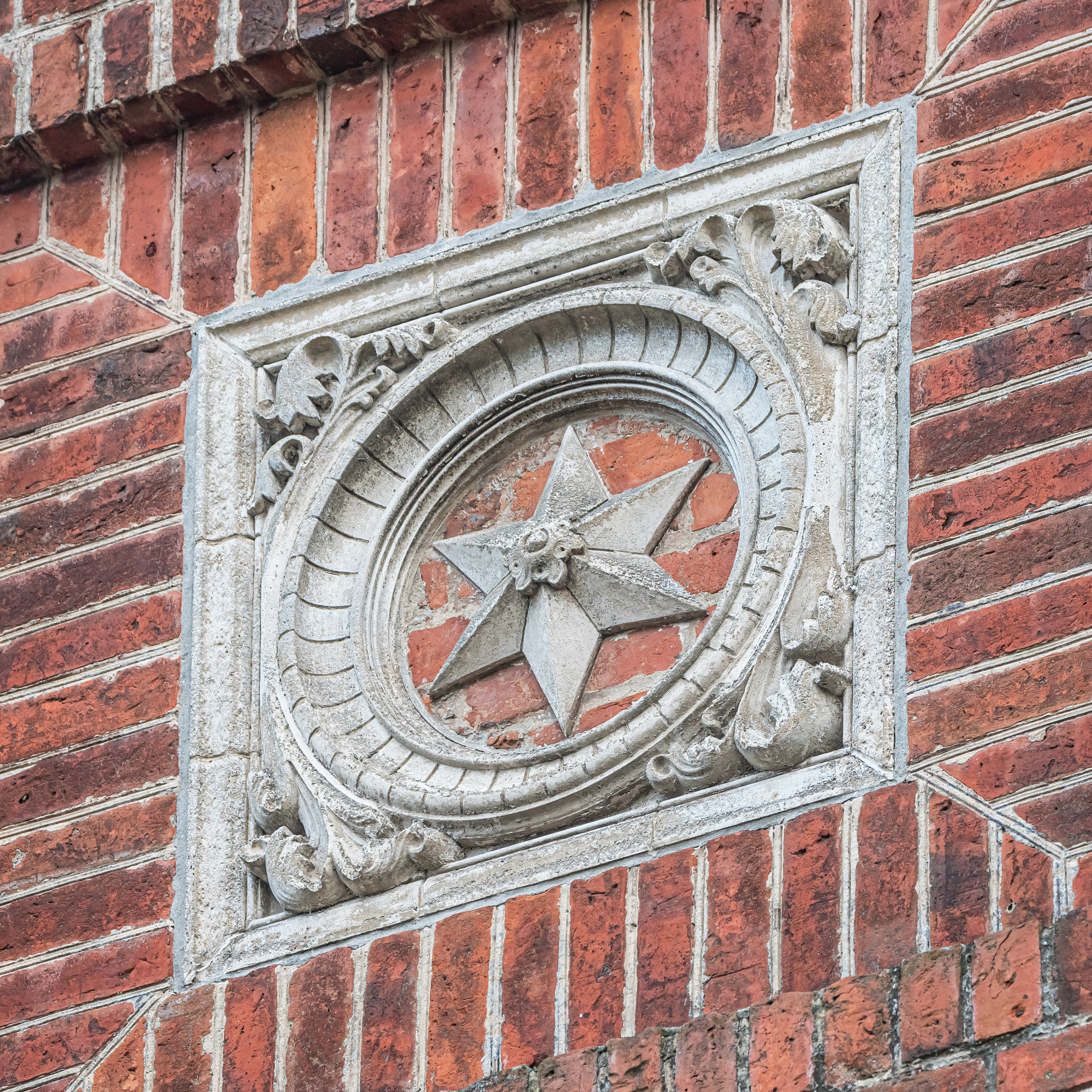
Star on the castle gable

A character that Fontane was anything but pleased with, as the sight of the panels with their hunting trophies in the dining room made the poet of the Mark lament a "deep and sudden decay of art", "beyond lay art, on this side barbarism". The royal bedroom reminded Fontane "of the storage facilities of an old ship's cabin" and seemed to him like an eerie cave.

We learn from Adelheid Schendel in the brochure Jagdschloss Stern published by the palace administration in 1987 that the little palace is a representative example of the "spartan, simple lifestyle" of the soldier king in contrast to his ostentatious predecessors. According to this, it is a simple Dutch house on Brandenburg soil. Whilst the hall is still of sophisticated design, "an important of the already rare examples of interior design from the period between Schlüter and Knobelsdorff", "the other rooms of the castle display the simple practicality of Dutch town houses". Adelheid Schendel also describes the bed more realistically than Fontane: "The bed in the bedroom, inserted into a wooden wall between staircase doors, is reminiscent of ship berths or bed stores in Frisian fishermen's and sailors' houses."

In the 1980s, the hunting lodge underwent a thorough renovation, but was closed again in 2005 for further renovation work. In addition to the main building, on which the Dutch Quarter in Potsdam was based, the old castellan's house, which was probably built in 1714, has been preserved. After par force hunting was discontinued under Frederick the Great and revived under Frederick Charles of Prussia, this form of hunting finally came to an end at the beginning of the 20th century.

=== Berlin property in Brandenburg ===
==== Berliner Luft - The permanent forest contract ====
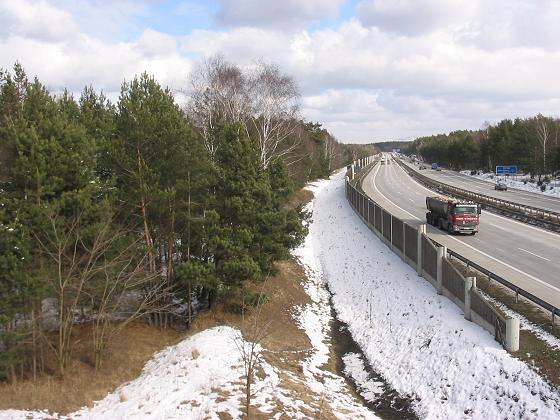
The A 115 cuts through the forest

Today, Stern and Jagdschloss are located directly next to the 115 freeway and are shielded from the high volume of the six-lane arterial road by visual and noise barriers. A former aisle leads through a tunnel under the highway to the east into the Parforceheide, and to the west are the new housing developments in the "Stern" district, which were built in the middle of the Parforceheide. The fact that large parts of the forest landscape have been preserved despite the immediate peripheral location to the Berlin and Potsdam metropolitan areas and despite massive, irreparable encroachments on the landscape conservation area with buildings such as the highway-like Nuthe expressway and the Potsdam freeway junction is due not least to a decision made by the Berlin city fathers in 1915 and 1920 when the Berlin metropolitan area was founded.

The permanent forest contract, also known as the contract of the century, which the Greater Berlin municipal association concluded with the Royal Prussian State in 1915, stipulated that the Parforceheide must remain as a source of air for Berlin. For 50 million gold marks, the special-purpose association purchased large sections of forest, around 10,000 hectares in total, from the Prussian state in the Grunewald, Tegel, Grünau, Köpenick and Potsdam foresters and undertook not to build on or sell on the acquired forest areas, but to preserve them in the long term for the citizens as a local recreation area.

In addition to the ecological and recreational aspects, which were already important at the time, the background to the purchases was to secure the water supply for the rapidly growing population in the greater Berlin area and to curb rampant land speculation.

==== Restitution by the Treuhand in 1995 ====
Parts of the Parforceheide belonged to the purchased area, which also formally became Berlin property in 1920 when the special-purpose association was transferred to the legal successor, the municipality of Greater Berlin. Legally, this part of the forest has the status of "private property of the Berlin Forests in the State of Brandenburg". After the final division of Germany and the founding of the GDR in 1949, West Berlin was cut off from the Parforceheide outside. East Berlin also lost ownership of the Parforceheide when, in 1952, all the forests outside Berlin were declared public property and came under the administration of the state of Brandenburg or the district of Potsdam.

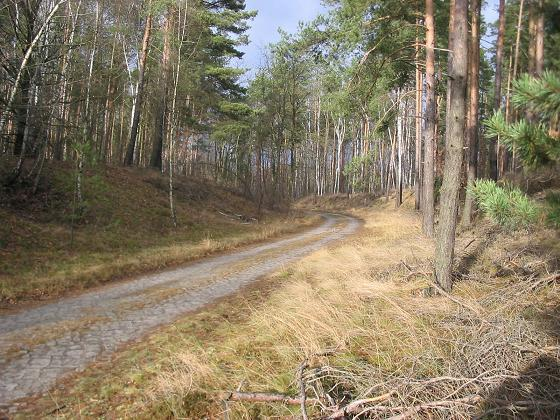
Old cobblestone path in the Parforceheide

Following the reunification of the separate districts and the restitution of the surrounding forest areas by the Treuhandanstalt in 1995, part of the forest once again belongs to the city of Berlin and is managed by the Dreilinden forestry district. Of Berlin's total forest area of around 29,000 hectares, 16,000 hectares are now in Berlin and 13,000 hectares outside in Brandenburg. The Berlin part of the Parforceheide is mainly located in the area between Albrechts Teerofen, Kohlhasenbrück, Steinstücken and the Südwestkirchhof Stahnsdorf, which is also Berlin territory in Brandenburg (owned by the Evangelical Church). There are also scattered smaller Berlin areas, such as Güterfelder Haussee.

In addition to the Berlin part of the Parforceheide and the Brandenburg part, for which the Nudow forestry district (formerly Forsthaus Ahrensdorf) is responsible, the third owner is the Federal Republic of Germany, which holds former GDR military areas in the forest region near Güterfelde as a federal forest.

== Ecology I: Flora and fauna ==
As the "division of the Berlin forests into an eastern and a western part [...] lasted less than a generation of trees", the differences in forest development are "not so serious" according to Reiner Cornelius, despite different positions, and can be compensated for relatively easily on the path taken today towards more natural stand forms. In addition, the GDR guidelines for forest management were still comparatively moderate until 1975, and during the subsequent intensification of economic forest use in East Germany, Berlin's forests, including those outside, were treated with special care. The forest suffered considerably greater damage before the division of Germany.

=== The Parforceheide forest ===
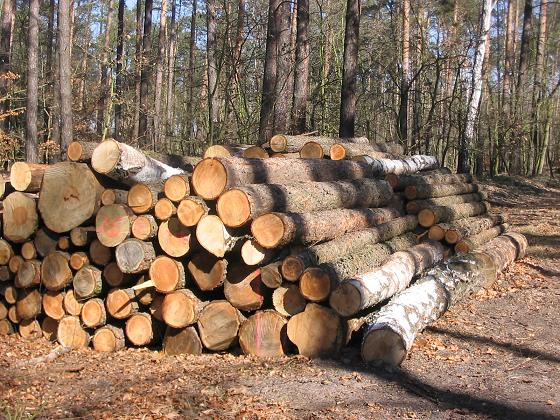
The timber industry today

There are no longer any natural forest communities in Berlin and the surrounding Brandenburg region, and the par force heath is also an artificially created forest community. The first reclamations and draining after the founding of the Mark Brandenburg in the middle of the 12th century already changed the natural forest structure. The pressure of the growing towns led to the establishment of pitch distilleries such as Albrecht's tar kiln, and the wood from the forest was used extensively for building houses and fires. The later electoral and royal hunting activities also had an impact on the condition of the forest. Around 45% of the forests fell victim to the most sustained overexploitation during the Second World War and in the times of need in the first post-war years. Around 1950, the clear-cut areas were largely reforested with fast-growing pine. As a result, a relatively high proportion of the Parforceheide today consists of pure pine stands that are around 50 years old. In addition, there are older, still preserved pine remnants, as the pine was already promoted by forestry in the centuries before, as it thrives well on the nutrient-poor but loose sandy soil of the Teltow and the profitability-oriented plantations gave preference to fast-growing main tree layers (the coniferous forest grows quickly into money).

The natural forest communities before the year 1200 consisted of pine-oak forests on the plateau sands of the Berlin oak valley. The proportion of pine was well below 50% - today it accounts for around 70% in the greater Berlin-Brandenburg area, 80 to 85% in the Brandenburg part of the Parforceheide and around 90% in the Berlin part, according to the respective forester's offices. With their equally low demands on nutrient and water supply, oaks, beeches and birches in particular complement the pine forest.

=== Alluvial forest remnants and water bodies ===
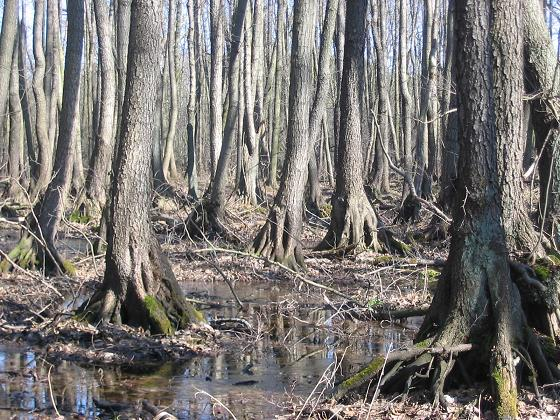
Riparian forest on the Große Rohrlake

In addition to these stands, the Parforceheide on the Hirtengraben, especially in the meadow and pond area of the Große Rohrlake, has small remnants of valuable quarry and floodplain forests, which, according to the forester's office, are dying off. The main reason for this is the drying up of the Hirtengraben in its upper course, which in turn is caused by the lowering of the water level at Güterfelder Haussee.

==== Haussee and Hirtengraben ====
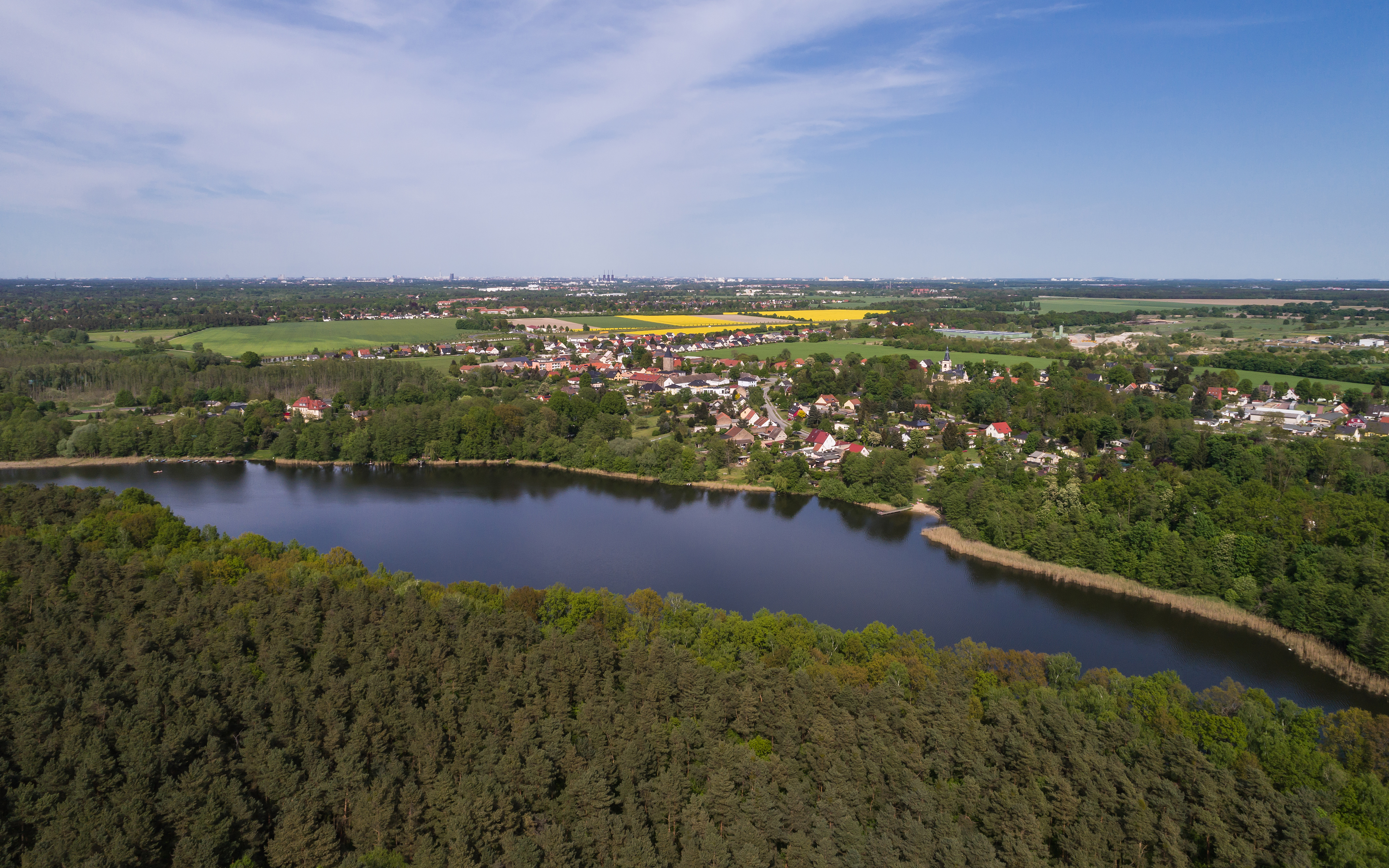
Haussee with Güterfelde

The shallow ice age lake is located to the east on the edge of the forest directly in front of the village of Güterfelde and covers an area of just under 5 hectares. Known as the "Pearl of Parforceheide" due to its location in the forest and its bathing beach, the Haussee was threatened with silting up after the nearby extensive sewage fields were abandoned at the end of the 1980s. Although a 1.2 million euro restoration of the lake in 2003 halted this process, it did not prevent the water level from still being more than one meter too low today. The Hirtengraben, the natural outlet of the lake, no longer receives any water. As the Hirtengraben is the only major watercourse in the Parforceheide and crosses the entire forest from east to west, the consequences for its water balance are dramatic and are leading to the death of the last of the swamp forests that depend on high moisture levels.

The last few meters of the ditch in the Parforceheide are fed by rain. It runs under the highway to Drewitz (rarely marked footpath on the right and left) into the individually designed Kirchsteigfeld district, which was built by an international ensemble of architects after reunification. Here, the Hirtengraben still has a flowing character today - much to the advantage of this showpiece of architectural postmodernism, which incorporated the Hirtengraben as a central component of the landscape-defining elements in the project. The Hirtengraben continues through a park on both sides to the recently dammed and protected biotope "Der Teich". The further, currently underground course through the old town of Drewitz is to be uncovered. The last section of Hirtengraben flows open again and flows into the Nuthe, which flows parallel to the Havel in a south–north direction just under two kilometers west of the forest.

==== Forest at the Teltow Canal ====
In addition to the Haussee lake, there are various small pools and ponds. The only larger body of water in the Parforceheide catchment area, the Teltow Canal, only has an ecological impact on a limited strip of forest running parallel to the canal due to its northern location. Here there are still swamp strips of the former Bäketal valley with old oak stands and riparian forests. At the end of the Teltow Canal near Kohlhasenbrück (see there), just a few meters behind the edge of the forest, the Bäkewiese nature reserve has been designated since 1988, which is home to an impressive cormorant colony between the canal and Griebnitzsee lake.

=== Other flora ===
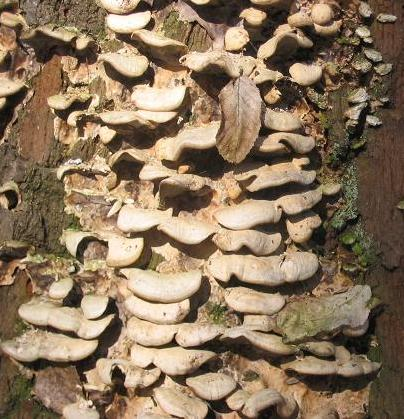
Tree fungus on dead wood

A naturally developed herb layer and a richly structured woody layer with the corresponding fauna is no longer present in the Berlin-Brandenburg forests or in the Parforceheide. According to district forester Bernd Krause, however, extensive areas of heather have developed in recent years and there has also been a marked return of blueberry. Among the taller shrubs, the late weeping cherry and the buckthorn can be found to a significant extent. The deciduous tree, which can grow up to six meters high, likes the acidic loam-clay soils of the Teltow, whose dry and nutrient-poor sandy areas are also suitable for undemanding grasses such as sheep's fescue and lichens.

=== Fauna ===
There were hardly any red deer even at the time of the electoral par force hunts. Today, it no longer occurs at all; between 1980 and 1990, there was briefly some fallow deer. In the 21st century, the par force heath has a high population of roe deer and wild boar. According to Bernd Krause, there are around eight roe deer per 100 hectares and around six wild boar per 100 hectares. Based on the total area of the Parforceheide nature reserve of 2,350 hectares, the total number of roe deer and wild boar is around 190 and 140 respectively. Despite intensive hunting, the populations are increasing. Occasionally there are also Berlin imports from the Grunewald: in February 2005, a pack of black leopards swam through the nearby Griebnitzsee and devastated 1,300 m^{2} of meadow next to the forest, much to the annoyance of the Brandenburgers.

The already high number of foxes continues to rise, badgers and stone martens remain stable with a slight upward trend and the number of polecats is falling. Birds include the goshawk, sparrowhawk and especially the black woodpecker, reptiles are represented by the slow worm, amphibians in large numbers by the common toad, whose population is developing well in the many small ponds. In the group of insects, the number of nests of the largest European wasp, the hornet, is increasing significantly, while the populations of the red wood ant continue to decline in the Parforce Heath. In older oak stands near the Teltow Canal, the endangered large oak longhorn beetle or giant longhorn beetle, which forestry had long classified as a pest, can be found. The imposing longhorn beetle, whose backward-curved antennae can reach a length of ten centimetres in males, is now strictly protected under the EU Habitats Directive.

== Ecology II: Landscape conservation area ordinance ==
Since the 1990s, the forestry offices have been working on slowing down harmful developments and creating near-natural areas. To this end, they are focusing on measures such as the careful suppression of non-native tree species, avoiding clear-cutting, increasing the proportion of dead wood and avoiding the use of fertilizers and pesticides.

In 1994, Berlin and Brandenburg introduced a new cross-state forestry framework plan (FRP) with the aim of coordinating and sustainably securing the utilization, protection and recreational functions of the forest. In 1997, this planning was partly reflected in the ordinance on the approximately 2,350-hectare landscape conservation area, in which the function of the area as a climatic compensation area in the south of the Berlin metropolitan area is expressly emphasized as a protective purpose - entirely in the spirit of the 1915 special-purpose association. The ordinance on the Parforceheide landscape conservation area of the state of Brandenburg dated November 12, 1997, which also applies to the Berlin and federal parts of the Parforceheide, highlights the following additional conservation purposes as well as maintenance and development measures for "this Pleistocene landscape":

=== Protection purposes ===
Excerpts from § 3 of the ordinance:

1. Conservation and restoration of the ecosystem in terms of
  1. the functionality of the soil,
  2. the functionality of the water balance and the near-natural development of watercourses,
  3. an extensive, structurally rich and partially undisturbed landscape as a habitat for a species-rich flora and fauna,
  4. the preservation of the largely culture-independent, diverse biotopes,
  5. the preservation of near-natural, contiguous forests,
  6. [...]
  7. the importance as a buffer zone for the nature reserves enclosed by the area,
2. the preservation, restoration and development of the beauty, diversity and uniqueness of a typical section of the young moraine landscape of the North German Plain,
3. the sustainable safeguarding of the recreational function.

=== Maintenance and development measures ===
Section 6 lists measures such as the conservation of wet meadows through scrub clearance, mowing or grazing and the conversion of meadows on fenland sites to extensive forms of cultivation. Small bodies of water, pools and ponds as well as ditches, where they have replaced former streams, are to be renaturalized. The existing pine forest communities are to be "converted into stands that are oriented towards the potential natural vegetation". To develop a nature-friendly recreational area, the ordinance provides for "a network of cycle paths, hiking trails and bridle paths" and the old cobbled streets are to be preserved as far as possible.

=== Aspiration and reality ===
The ordinance on the landscape conservation area did not prevent the destruction of woodland areas at the beginning of the 21st century by the new development districts in Potsdam described above, the Nuthe expressway and the six-lane expansion of the A 115. The current state of the flora and fauna also shows that the LSG has not had the desired effect in all areas.

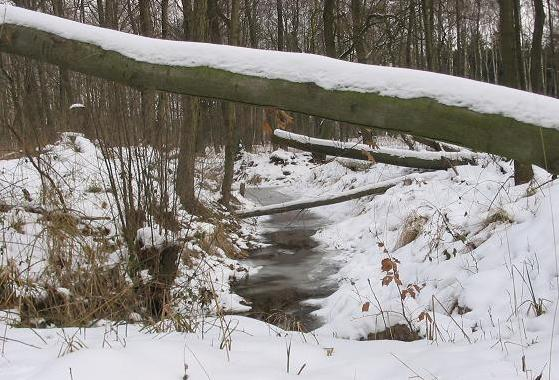
Shepherd's ditch

- The required near-natural development of the watercourses is offset by the drying out of the Hirtengraben,
- The death of the last alluvial forests and the loss of the last riparian forests contradict the required preservation of natural vegetation.
- The required preservation of contiguous forests took a back seat to any major road construction.

Only eight years later, the requirements of this 1997 regulation have been overtaken by reality in important respects. In May 2004, against great resistance, the Brandenburg Nature Conservation Act was amended, with the result that the Potsdam-Mittelmark District Nature Conservation Advisory Council lost its previous right of objection, for example in planning procedures. The seven-member voluntary advisory board, which included two very committed citizens from Kleinmachnow and Güterfelde who were concerned about the Parforceheide and the Bäketal, resigned as a result.

The successful measures include increasing the proportion of dead wood, which remains in its natural state on the one hand and on the other hand serves to create a very high number of Benjes hedges to promote near-natural vegetation. The development of cycle paths, bridleways and hiking trails is progressing, and a new pedestrian bridge over the Nuthe expressway has linked the Große Rohrlake better to the network of paths from the direction of Stern since 2005.

In 2014, the application for a special helicopter landing pad by a Schönefeld furniture company in the Parforceheide on the former military training area near Güterfelde on the Haussee was announced and publicly criticized.

== Literature ==
- Martin Klees: Der Berliner Waldbesitz im Wandel der Zeiten. In: Allgemeine Forstzeitschrift, Nr. 29/1963, ISSN 0002-5860, p. 450 ff.
- Theodor Fontane: Wanderungen durch die Mark Brandenburg. Part 3: Havelland. (1st edition 1873.) Quotations according to the edition Nymphenburger Verlagshandlung, Munich 1971, ISBN 3-485-00293-3 (quotations appendix Gütergotz, p. 442 f.).

== Sources ==
- Detailed forestry information and development trends are based in part on an interview with district forester Bernd Krause in the Nudow (formerly Ahrensdorf) forestry district, municipality of Nuthetal, March 15, 2005.

Media related to Parforceheide at Wikimedia Commons
