= Water Engineers for the Americas =

- Founded: January 1, 2002
- Type: 501(c)(3)
- Tax ID no.: 85-0482431
- Location: Santa Fe, New Mexico
- Region served: Latin America
- Services: Donated design and funding of clean water and basic sanitation systems
- Method: Volunteer water engineers, low-cost, self-help projects, community participation
- Key people: Peter Fant, president
- Employees: 2 part-time
- Volunteers: 20 to 30
- Website: wefta.net

Water Engineers for the Americas (WEFTA) is a 501(c)(3) nonprofit, founded in Santa Fe, New Mexico, in 2002.

In rural populations around the world, approximately 15% of people do not have access to improved water systems, and between 30-50% have unimproved sanitation systems. Focusing on Latin American communities, WEFTA's mission is to ensure access to potable water and proper sanitation, reduce waterborne diseases, protect the environment and lessen the burden of hauling and disinfecting water on families, especially women and children.

== Structure ==
WEFTA is an all-volunteer organization. The volunteer board of directors is made up of water engineers and community development professionals from several firms in the southwest United States, most notably Souder Miller & Associates (New Mexico) and Aqua Engineering (Utah). Engineers from these and other firms donate their expertise to help communities in Latin America build and maintain simple, inexpensive potable water and basic sanitation systems. Volunteers use vacation time or are on loan from their companies while on assignment. WEFTA works only when requested by the benefitting community, which covers the volunteer’s expenses on the ground. Transportation to projects is donated by individuals and through grants to cover overhead expenses through the Wallace Genetic Foundation. WEFTA also partners with UniversalGiving to raise fund for projects. 100% of any other donations received by WEFTA go directly to fund material costs for projects (such as PVC pipe, hand pumps, water purifiers, etc.).

== How it works ==
A community needing water or sanitation generally hears about WEFTA through word of mouth. A leader of that community fills out an application and submits it to WEFTA in Santa Fe or to a local WEFTA volunteer. Before committing to a project, a WEFTA member meets with the entire community to identify the community leader who will manage the role of the beneficiaries of the project. The local community must collect 30-40% of the material cost of the project or apply for these funds from their municipalities or regional governments. WEFTA often matches these funds, which are low due to the low-tech nature of the projects. The community performs all unskilled labor and also collects materials such as gravel or sand, depending on the project. One or more water engineers visit and live within the community and design the simplest, most easy to maintain system possible to provide potable water and/or basic sanitation. The volunteer stays until the project is completed and WEFTA returns approximately every two years to ensure that the system is still functioning and is well maintained. Once a community is engaged with WEFTA, WEFTA guarantees to maintain and repair the water system for life with the help of the community.

== Work to date ==
In 2011, WEFTA was invited by a group of municipalities in the Urubamba Valley of Peru—the Sacred Valley of the Incas and site of a quickly developing tourism industry—to devise a simple solution for waste water treatment of the polluted Urubamba river. WEFTA representatives have made several trips there and submitted plans to use cheap, effective organic biodigesters to replace the costly and inefficient traditional chemical or filtration plants.

In November 2013, WEFTA entered into a partnership with USAID-ACCESO]to promote health and livelihoods of over 300,000 residents of western Honduras with WEFTA upgrading and building new water system worth approximately US$350,000 to achieve those ends.

By May 2014, WEFTA had completed 62 projects in seven countries (Bolivia, Colombia, El Salvador, Guatemala, Honduras, Mexico and Peru). These projects have directly provided approximately 3,400 families (17,000 individuals) with potable water and/or basic sanitation or waste water treatment. WEFTA has worked with partners around the country and at the request of Save the Children in Honduras, Habitat for Humanity in Guatemala and Peru, Lutheran World Relief and Homes from the Heart.

In addition to designing and building water systems, WEFTA also provides training and education to partners in the countries it serves, seeking to empower local engineers and technicians to carry forward the work WEFTA has started with community-based, self-help projects WEFTA has also held several WASH-in-Schools programs and built toilet, shower and drinking-water facilities for regional schools in Peru and Bolivia. By 2025, WEFTA reported that its projects had directly benefited more than 281,000 people and reached a further 3.3 million people through improvements to water, sanitation and hygiene services at healthcare facilities.
