= Główna =

Główna may refer to the following places in Poland:

- Główna, Greater Poland Voivodeship
- Główna, Pomeranian Voivodeship
- Główna, a district and stream in Nowe Miasto, Poznań
