= Kolata (disambiguation) =

Kolata may refer to:

- Kolata, a traditional folk dance of Karnataka, India
- Kołata, a village in Poznań County, Poland
- Gina Kolata (born 1948), American science journalist
