= Operation USA =

American world aid organization founded 1979

Operation USA (aka Operation California, In.)
- Founded: 1979, with its California incorporation date in May 1980
- Founder: Richard M. Walden
- Purpose: Disaster relief, Disaster recovery, Health, Education, Youth Programs, Food Security, Long-term rebuilding
- Location: Los Angeles, California
- Region served: Global
- Key people: Richard M. Walden, President and CEO Board Members: Julie Andrews; Jonathan Estrin; Gary Larsen; Skip Whitney; Bob Johnson; Maria Mohiuddin Verjee; Drew Hagen; Dr. Stanley Frileck; Michael Mahdesian(Chairman); Jeff Franklin; Rosario Dawson; Rick Allen; Peter Greenberg; Julie Yannatta
- Website: www.opusa.org

Operation USA (also known as OpUSA, Operation California, or OpCal) is a non-profit humanitarian organization supporting health, education, and relief programs at home and abroad. The Organization is privately funded, receiving no assistance from the United States federal government. OPUSA had a revenue of over $2.6 million in the fiscal year 2019, and since 1979 has delivered more than $400 million in aid to 100 countries.

== Awards and affiliations ==
Operation USA was part of the International Campaign to Ban Landmines in 1997 when it won the Nobel Peace Prize. Operation California was the winner of the 1983 President's Volunteer Action Award. Operation USA has been named one of "America's Best 100 Charities" by Worth Magazine, and in October 2008, was named the top-rated "exclusively privately funded charity in the U.S." by Charity Navigator. Operation USA collaborated with NASA's Jet Propulsion Laboratory, Lawrence Livermore National Laboratory, and Los Alamos National Laboratory to develop new approaches to land mine detection. Operation USA is a member of InterAction and Reuters AlertNet as a news partner. In 2014, Operation USA's CEO Richard M. Walden received the Honeywell Hometown Hero Award from the Honeywell Corp.

== History ==
Operation California began in 1979 as "a relief organization created to provide aid to Vietnamese boat people and Cambodian refugees", co-founded by Richard Walden (still active as President & CEO) and Llewellyn Werner (who left in early 1980). The Organization flew "the first international relief airlift to Cambodia since 1975", delivering medicine to Phnom-Penh. Operation California had airlifted more than $3 million (equivalent to $13,308,116 in 2025) worth of aid by October 1979.

In 1982, Operation California sent "the first private airlift from the U.S. to Poland", delivering 200,000 lb (91,000 kg). of medical supplies and medicine; that year Operation California also airlifted medical supplies to Lebanon. In 1983, Operation California delivered aid to the children of Vietnam and Cambodia. Operation California provided aid to the earthquake victims in Mexico City in 1985, as well as working in cooperation with the Unitarian Universalist Service Committee and Oxfam America, to deliver $250,000 (equivalent to $748,376 in 2025) worth of medical aid to Nicaragua. In 1986, Operation California, in conjunction with Medical Aid to El Salvador, sent "two cargo planes carrying $500,000 (equivalent to $1,468,579 in 2025) worth of relief supplies to earthquake-stricken El Salvador". In 1988, Operation California began using the name Operation USA because it better described the effort and intent of the organization to represent the entire American people. In 1989, Operation USA facilitated operations on children in Vietnam who had cleft palates by a Los Angeles-based plastic surgeon, Dr Stanley Frileck.

Medical aid and rebuilding effort was delivered to Mexico in 1990 by OpUSA. In 1991, OpUSA delivered aid to Bangladesh. In 1993, OpUSA did the same thing to war-torn Somali. In 1994, OpUSA provided earthquake relief. In 1999, the Organization provided aid to Hurricane Mitch survivors in Honduras and Nicaragua. In that same year, OpUSA gave essential supplies to storm victims in Mexico.

In 2003, OpUSA delivered aid to Iraq War victims in the Persian Gulf. The tsunami victims in Sri Lanka and Indonesia were aided by OpUSA in 2004, as well as the Mexico City flood victims. In 2008, OpUSA has delivered aid to Myanmar cyclone victims as well as Chinese earthquake victims and flood victims in the Midwest, USA. In 2015, OpUSA partnered with UniversalGiving and United Airlines to raise funds for its Nepal Earthquake recovery project, rebuilding a school in Fyakse, in the Dhading district. In 2017, OpUSA launched relief efforts helping communities impacted by an unprecedented string of disasters, including Hurricane Harvey, Hurricane Maria, Hurricane Irma, and the California wildfires. In 2018, OpUSA delivered cash grants and supplies to aid communities impacted by Hurricanes Florence and Michael in the eastern US.

In 2020, OpUSA began responding to the COVID-19 pandemic in the United States by delivering cash and supplies to partners aiding front-line workers.

== Celebrity affiliates ==
Operation USA, since the early 1980s, has relied on fundraising efforts featuring singers and celebrities. These include concerts, dinners, and other events. These promotions have featured:

- Barbra Streisand
- Bonnie Raitt
- Carol Burnett
- Crosby, Stills & Nash
- Don Henley
- Ed Asner
- Frank Sinatra
- Jack Elliot
- Jackson Browne
- James Garner
- John Denver
- Julie Andrews
- Kirk Douglas
- Michael Jackson
- New American Orchestra
- Plácido Domingo
- Ricardo Montalbán
- Ry Cooder
- Sharon Stone
- The Buena Vista Social Club
- Tony Adams

Rosario Dawson travelled with Operation USA to Nicaragua in 2008. In 2013, Jessica Alba donated $51,445 worth of products from the Honest Company through Operation USA to victims of Typhoon Haiyan in the Philippines. George Hamilton, Barbra Streisand, Rosario Dawnson, Jude Law, Leslie Mann, and others, also assisted in relief efforts.

== Film and theater projects ==
Operation USA's funds come from television and film including:

- Because We Care (CBS Television Special)
- Beyond Borders (Hollywood)
- Buena Vista Social Club (Hollywood & Havana)
- Fidel (Hollywood for Showtime)
- Mary Poppins (London stage)
- Miss Saigon (Hollywood)
- Roll Bounce
- The Killing Fields (Hollywood & Cambodia)
- Victor/Victoria (Broadway)
- Eloise at The Plaza (Disney TV)
