= Exclaves of West Berlin in East Germany =

During the division of Germany (1945–1990), West Berlin was controlled by the Western Allies (United States, United Kingdom, France), but was completely surrounded by the territory of East Germany and East Berlin. Twelve small areas of land belonging to West Berlin were not connected by land to the rest of West Berlin, but were exclaves surrounded by the East German territory. There was also Tiefwerder, an inhabited East German exclave within West Berlin.

When Greater Berlin was constituted on 1 October 1920, a total of ten Berlin exclaves were created surrounded by the Province of Brandenburg. Although these exclaves were under Berlin's administration, they were not connected by land to the city proper (as is the definition of exclave). The London Protocol signed on 12 September 1944 set out Allied arrangements for dividing Germany into zones of occupation and Berlin into sectors of occupation after the war. The protocol took the old German administrative borders as its guide. As it happened, all of the exclaves belonged to West Berlin boroughs. As a result, they ended up being retained as enclaves after 1945, first inside the Soviet occupation zone and after 1949 inside East Germany.

== List of the exclaves after 1945 ==
Map of divided Berlin, indicating by broken lines at its western border the land swaps decided by the Allies. The five larger exclaves of the original twelve (Steinstücken, Laßzinswiesen, Falkenhagener Wiesen, Wüste Mark, Kienhorst) are shown.

During the Cold War these exclaves raised sovereignty issues that led to repeated conflicts. Traffic to and from Steinstücken, for instance, the only exclave with permanent residents, was often hindered as it crossed East German territory, resulting in frequent confrontations between East German authorities, residents, representatives of the Berlin Senate and the U.S. Army.

West Berlin's twelve exclaves were the following:

1. Böttcherberg (0.3 hectares (0.74 acres)): three unconnected, uninhabited, and unused pieces of land, belonged to West Berlin's Borough of Zehlendorf, ceded to East Germany in 1971, since then a part of Potsdam.
2. Erlengrund (0.51 hectares (1.3 acres)): Allotment club, seasonally inhabited, belonging to the Borough of Spandau and territorially connected with West Berlin when East Germany ceded the adjacent tract of land in 1988. Until 1988, the members of the allotment club in West Berlin could access it only via a short passage while accompanied by East German border guards. Except for emergency rescuers, no one else was allowed to access the exclave. The path to Erlengrund was fenced on both sides so not to allow access to East Germans.
3. Falkenhagener Wiesen (45.44 hectares (112.3 acres)): unused grassland, belonged to the Borough of Spandau, ceded to East Germany in 1988, since then a part of Falkensee.
4. Fichtewiese (3.51 hectares (8.7 acres)): Allotment club, seasonally inhabited, belonging to the Borough of Spandau and territorially connected with West Berlin when East Germany ceded the adjacent tract of land in 1988. Until 1988, the allotment holders had to pass East German border controls on their way between Fichtewiese and the rest of West Berlin. Except for emergency rescuers, no one else was allowed to access the exclave. The path connecting Fichtewiese with West Berlin was fenced on both sides so not to allow access to East Germans.
5. Finkenkrug (3.45 hectares (8.5 acres)): 5 kilometres (3.1 mi) away from West Berlin's border, and belonged to the Borough of Spandau, ceded to East Germany in 1971, since then a part of Falkensee.
6. Große Kuhlake (8.03 hectares (19.8 acres)): unused grassland, belonged to the Borough of Spandau, ceded to East Germany in 1971.
7. Laßzins-Wiesen (13.49 hectares (33.3 acres)): unused grassland, belonged to the Borough of Spandau, ceded to East Germany in 1988, since then a part of Schönwalde.
8. Nuthewiesen (3.64 hectares (9.0 acres)): uninhabited wet meadows, belonged to the Borough of Zehlendorf, ceded to East Germany in 1971, since then a part of Potsdam.
9. Steinstücken (12.67 hectares (31.3 acres)): inhabited by West Berliners and belonging to the Borough of Zehlendorf. Until 1971, the inhabitants had to pass East German border controls on their way between Steinstücken and the main area of West Berlin. Except for emergency rescuers and repair personnel, no one else was allowed to access the exclave. The road connecting Steinstücken was fenced on both sides, not allowing Easterners to enter. In 1961, a permanent U.S. military post was erected in the exclave. All military personnel stationed there had to be flown in by helicopter. In 1971, Steinstücken's status as exclave ended when it was connected to West Berlin by a strip of territory about 1 kilometre (0.62 mi) in length and 20 metres (66 ft) in width. This territory was acquired by West Berlin during the territorial re-allocations. A paved two-lane road (Bernhard-Beyer-Straße) was constructed in this strip before the territory was handed over from East Germany to West Berlin. This road was bordered by the Berlin Wall on both sides. Bus line 18 (now 118) was extended into Steinstücken in 1972.
10. Wüste Mark (21.83 hectares (53.9 acres)): despite its name (meaning "desert march"), it is a seasonally tilled acreage, belonging to the Borough of Zehlendorf. It was ceded to East Germany in 1988, and since then a part of Stahnsdorf. Wüste Mark is a tract of land adjacent to Wilmersdorf's forest cemetery in Güterfelde.

== Territorial exchanges ==
To ease movement between West Berlin and its exclaves, two territorial exchanges took place.

=== First exchange ===
The first exchange was part of the Four-Power Agreement on Berlin and took place on 20 December 1971. The agreement specified, at part II C and Annex III 3, that "the problems of the small enclaves, including Steinstücken, and of other small areas may be solved by exchange of territory". On the 3 June 1972, East Germany gave a total of 15.6 hectares of land, while West Berlin got a total of 17.1 hectares. The following six exclaves were ceded to East Berlin:

1. the 3 Böttcherberg pieces of land;
2. Finkenkrug;
3. Große Kuhlake;
4. Nuthewiesen.

From this time, Steinstücken was connected to West Berlin. The most important piece of property was the 2.3 hectares that connected Steinstücken to the Zehlendorf borough. The Senate paid the East German government DM 4 million in compensation for the extra land. In a second supplementary arrangement signed on 21 July 1972, the Senate and the East German government sold for DM 31 million the 8.5 hectares plot of Berlin's former Potsdam Railway Station previously belonging to East Berlin's Mitte borough.

=== Second exchange ===
In a second redeployment in 1988, the following three exclaves were ceded to East Berlin:

1. Falkenhagener Wiesen;
2. Laßzins-Wiesen;
3. Wüste Mark.

From this time, Erlengrund and Fichtewiese were territorially connected with West Berlin. On 31 March 1988, after more than 4 years of negotiations, West Berlin received 14 pieces of property, for a total of 96.7 hectares, along the inner and outer borders of the city, including the Lenné-Dreieck, a triangle of land at Potsdamer Platz. East Germany acquired the West Berlin exclaves Falkenhager Wiese, Lasszinswiesen and Wüste Mark, along with a 50 m^{2} strip of land along the freight station Eberswalder Güterbahnhof north of Bernauer Strasse in the Wedding borough (today's Mauerpark). East Germany also received DM 76 million additional compensation. As a result of this exchange, West Berlin's territory grew by 9.4 hectares. By declaratory action the Tiefwerder Meadows, an East German enclave within West Berlin's Spandau, de jure forming part of the Seeburg municipality, became officially part of Spandau.

Moreover, in a protocol note, both sides declared that they no longer had exclaves within each other's territory from this time.

== See also ==
- Klein Glienicke
