= EcoLogic Development Fund =

- Formation: 1993; 33 years ago
- Type: Nonprofit
- Tax ID no.: 25-1704582
- Legal status: 501(c)(3)
- Purpose: Conservation, Reforestation, Microwatershed management, Community self-determination
- Headquarters: Cambridge, Massachusetts
- Region served: Latin America
- Method: Promoting sustainable livelihoods, Payment for Ecosystem Services (PES), Linking environmental stewardship to economic development
- Website: https://www.ecologic.org/

EcoLogic Development Fund (EcoLogic), a 501(c)3 nonprofit organization based in Cambridge, Massachusetts, in the United States, advances conservation of critical natural resources in rural Latin America by promoting sustainable livelihoods and strengthening community participation in environmental stewardship. EcoLogic was established to fulfill a mandate voiced by indigenous and environmental leaders at the 1992 Earth Summit to reduce the destruction of significant tropical ecosystems by advancing economic development and self-determination among communities living in and around threatened habitats. EcoLogic partners with local organizations to promote community-based management of forests and coastal ecosystems, often at the level of microwatersheds; direct water sources and the land cover that helps recharge and clean the water. Since 1993, EcoLogic has provided direct technical and financial assistance to over 5,000 rural communities and has helped to protect 2,000 water sources throughout Latin America.

== Work ==
=== The Impact of Poverty on Biodiversity ===
Latin America is home to some of the greatest biodiversity of plants and animals but also some of the poorest people in the western hemisphere. EcoLogic is motivated by the belief that resource use associated with conditions of poverty (slash and burn agriculture, clearcutting, overfishing) places tremendous pressure on fragile ecosystems. Similar threats are posed by ecologically unsustainable activities in mining, agribusiness, and oil exploration. It is the balance between human needs and environmental imperatives that EcoLogic finds most compelling in addressing the future of the planet. In its 2007 State of the World's Forests report, the UN's Food and Agriculture Organization found that in the last 15 years, Latin America has lost over 158,000,000 acres (640,000 km^{2}) of forest. Central America alone has lost 19%, the largest percentage for the region. This habitat devastation accelerates the loss of species, endangers critical sources of safe water, and contributes the massive release of greenhouse gases that exacerbates global warming.

=== Mitigating climate change ===
One approach that EcoLogic uses to address the anticipated challenges of climate change is to plant and protect trees that store the carbon dioxide our society produces (CO_{2} sequestration). Tropical forests have been identified as especially effective areas to serve this function. EcoLogic's conservation efforts in the heavily forested areas of Latin America are leading the way in the introduction of sequestration as a solution to local conservation efforts and global environmental well-being.

Between 1993 and 2013, EcoLogic worked with 627 rural and indigenous communities in Central America and Mexico, planted 1,319,500 trees for reforestation and watershed rehabilitation, and built 2,500 fuel-efficient stoves. EcoLogic's Belizean partner Sarstoon Temash Institute for Indigenous Management (SATIIM), along with other indigenous groups in southern Belize, won a landmark legal victory in the Supreme Court of Belize that recognizes indigenous land rights around the Sarstoon Temash National Park.

== Partnerships ==
Partnerships include the following organizations:

- Association of Water Committees of the Southern Sector of Pico Bonito National Park (AJAASSPIB)
- Regional Environmental Collaborative for the Chinantla Region of Oaxaca, Mexico (FARCO)
- Mayan Association for Well-Being in the Sarstun Region (APROSARSTUN)
- Municipalities of the Central Atlantida Department (MAMUCA) (Honduras)
- Municipality of Olanchito (MACO)
- Sarstoon Temash Institute for Indigenous Management (SATIIM)
- The Natural Resource Council of the Mayors of the 48 Cantons of Totonicapan
- The Northern Border Municipalities Alliance (MFN)
- UniversalGiving, an online nonprofit organization to raise fund for EcoLogic project.

== See also ==
- 1993 in the environment
