= Nepal Youth Foundation =

US-based non-profit organization

Nepal Youth Foundation (NYF)
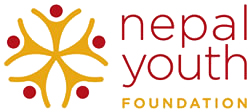
- Founded: 1990, Sausalito, California
- Purpose: Charity
- Location: 1016 Lincoln Blvd, Suite 222, San Francisco, California
- Region served: Nepal
- Website: nepalyouthfoundation.org

The Nepal Youth Foundation (NYF) is a U.S.-based 501(c)(3) non-profit organization. The mission of NYF is to provide children in Nepal with education, housing, medical and nutritional care, and general support.

NYF was founded in 1990 by Olga Murray after she retired from a career as an attorney for the California Supreme Court. First called the Nepalese Youth Opportunity Foundation (NYOF), the name was later changed to Nepal Youth Foundation. In 2012, Som Paneru, who joined NYF in 1995 as a program assistant, was elected president of the organization. Olga Murray is the Honorary Board President and Founder. NYF rescues and supports children in Nepal through a range of programs. The Nepal Youth Foundation's partners are made up of private foundations and individuals around the world and non-governmental organizations in Nepal. The Nepal Youth Foundation also partners with UniversalGiving, an online non-profit organization to raise funds for its projects.

NYF prides itself on long-term, community-led, culturally-appropriate programming. Though the organization is U.S.-based with a mostly-American Board of Directors, the staff distribution is primarily Nepalese. A small U.S.-based team of three to four individuals provides messaging and fundraising support in English, while the entire Nepal-based team of around 70 members is composed of Nepalese citizens. This includes NYF's President, Som Paneru, who designs and manages programs from Kathmandu. This community-led approach allows NYF to target interventions in culturally-sensitive ways that address the specific problems faced by beneficiaries.

Though NYF's focus is on long-term programs rather than emergency relief, the organization has provided crucial support to communities following disasters. Immediately following the April 2015 Nepal earthquake, NYF provided safe housing, medical support, nutritional care, and rebuilding aid to devastated communities. Many children left orphaned by the disaster have remained under NYF support, receiving housing, educational scholarships, and other benefits. NYF routinely supports communities impacted by deadly floods in Nepal. During the COVID-19 pandemic, NYF has provided important interventions including K–12 education in lockdown, nutritional aid, safe quarantine housing, and a COVID-19 isolation center. The organization has also been proud to count many of its past medical school scholarship recipients among the front-line workers battling the pandemic in Nepal's hospitals.

Before the April 2015 Nepal earthquake, NYF earned twelve consecutive 4-star ratings, the highest possible, from Charity Navigator for its efficient use of donations. A sharp uptick in donations in response to the earthquake, followed by a return to NYF's more modest budget in the years following, has resulted in the false appearance of a shrinking organization, leading to a brief drop in this rating. Currently NYF possesses a 3-star "Give With Confidence" rating.

== Liberating girls from indentured servitude ==
From January 2000 through June 2020, Nepal Youth Foundation was deeply involved in eradicating the practice of Kamaiya and kamlari among the Tharu people in Western Nepal. Through the Kamlari system, Tharu girls as young as six years old were sold into domestic servitude for an average of $30 per year, only returning to their homes once per year and often working well into puberty or until adulthood. An ABC News report stated that many of the girls never returned home, while others were abused or forced into prostitution. Most were denied an education. At the time NYF became involved, an estimated 20,000 girls were currently in Kamlari bondage throughout Nepal.

The Kamlari practice was rooted in systems of oppression and predatory lending between the Tharu people and wealthier ethnic majorities in the regions affected.

The Nepal Youth Foundation's Indentured Daughters Program - later called the Empowering Freed Kamlaris program - worked with local communities to encourage parents to bring their daughters home from the city and provided a piglet or goat which the families could raise and sell. NYF then ensured the girls attended local schools. During NYF's 20-year program, nearly 13,000 were rescued.

This multi-pronged program involved advocacy, educational support, psychological counseling, legal action, and training allowing the rescued girls and young women to agitate on their own behalf.

On June 27, 2013 the government of Nepal declared the abolition of the Kamlari system, a major development in NYF's campaign to end child slavery. This means the government is finally committed to enforcing existing laws that have long been ignored, a move prompted by the growing power of the freed Kamlari girls and a shift in the attitudes of people throughout Nepal.

The final phase of the Empowering Freed Kamlaris program was to support the establishment of a new nonprofit organization called the Freed Kamlari Development Forum(FKDF), led and operated locally, by the freed women themselves. In June 2020, full control of the program passed from NYF to the FKDF, which continues their work through microlending cooperative programs which prevent the cycles of predatory lending which led to the kamlari practice. The FKDF is also focused on reducing child marriage in their communities.

NYF remains connected with the FKDF communities by providing job readiness programs, educational scholarship opportunities, and other leadership training.

== Nutritional rehabilitation homes ==
At the Nepal Youth Foundation's Nutritional Rehabilitation Homes (NRHs), children who are severely malnourished are attended to and usually restored to health while their parents are educated in child nutrition, hygiene and care. At the urging of the Ministry of Health, NYF has constructed 17 residential rehabilitation centers for extremely malnourished children, in Kathmandu and in rural areas of Nepal, each associated with a government-run zonal hospital serving a large rural area. The children and their mothers live at these centers for an average of five weeks. By the time they leave, the child is in good health and of normal weight, and the parent is educated in child care, including preparation of nutritious meals using foods readily available in rural Nepal. NYF's field workers later follow up in the villages.

The majority of the NRHs built by NYF were intended to become part of Nepal's government-run health infrastructure, and most have successfully made the transition from NYF control to Nepal's health system's control. These facilities, each standing near a major hospital, receive children discharged from the hospital who no longer need medical care but do require significant intervention for malnutrition in order to prevent future infection. Staff members for each facility are specially trained at NYF's flagship Nutritional Rehabilitation Home in Kathmandu Valley. This flagship facility remains under NYF control.

Since 1998, the NRHs have provided care to thousands of mother-child pairs. Each year more than 1,000 children's lives are transformed by this project.

== Scholarships ==
The Nepal Youth Foundation provides scholarships for children who have no other way to attend school. The organization supports thousands of youngsters from kindergarten through medical school. These students attend private and government schools in the city of Kathmandu and in rural villages that are often more than a day’s walk from any road. In rural areas, this is usually the first generation to receive an education. The cost is about $100 a year per child. An education will best prepare these youngsters for the difficult future that awaits them, since an increasing number of the next generation in Nepal’s overpopulated hills will inherit no land and will have no choice but to compete for jobs in the cities.

The scholarships motivate parents other than those whose children NYF supports to send their children to school, too. There is social pressure in the village when some kids go to school and others do not. NYF also trains teachers and builds and improves schools.

NYF's Vocational Education and Career Counseling Center (VECC) sponsors children in training programs for dozens of different careers, such as website designer, hotel manager, nurse-midwife, electrician, cook, and lab technician, and the number continues to grow. VECC also provides career counseling.

NYF also helps educate disabled children, advocating for them in a culture which still heavily stigmatizes any disability.

== Children's homes ==
Olgapuri Children's Village is a spacious complex housing 80 young people who have been orphaned, abandoned, or otherwise left without reliable housing and care. Opened in 2017, the complex became the new home for the 40 residents of J&K House (NYF's original children's homes) as well as many other children and teenagers.

The campus comprises four houses for boys and girls (Junior Boys, Senior Boys, Junior Girls, Senior Girls), a dining hall, farmland, large play area, a vocational education center and a guest house. Each 20-child house is staffed by a married couple of "house parents" who serve as attentive parental figures for the children.

NYF provides these children with personal attention, as well as education and medical expenses. NYF commits to provide for these children through college. Most of the children are sponsored by donors in Western countries.

== Flood relief ==
Severe floods hit Nepal mid-August, 2014, leaving hundreds of families without shelter and basic necessities. NYF and its supporters raised over $32,000. By August 31, NYF’s distribution of flood relief supplies had reached 831 families in the Bardiya and Banke districts. Of these, 137 are the families of former Kamlari girls, and 76 of them became completely homeless.

NYF was the first humanitarian organization to reach out to these villages and distribute a complete set of relief materials. The team was led by Man Bahadur Chhetri, Regional Manager of NYF’s Empowering Freed Kamlaris program. The distribution was organized in coordination with the Red Cross and the local government, which provided security to ensure the process was safe and fair.

In addition to the relief support, NYF designated $29,000 to rebuild two schools destroyed by the flood, one in Dang District and another in Bardiya District. This project was in coordination with District Education Office of the government and local people.
