= Gurten =

Gurten may refer to:

- Gurten (beer), a brand of beer brewed at the Feldschlösschen brewery in Switzerland
- Gurten (festival), a music festival held near Bern, Switzerland
- Gurten (mountain), a mountain near the city of Bern, Switzerland
  - Gurten Funicular, a railway to the summit of the mountain
- Gurten (Upper Austria), a municipality in the district of Ried im Innkreis in Upper Austria, Austria
- the former German name for Góra, a village in the administrative district of Gmina Pobiedziska, within Poznań County, Greater Poland Voivodeship, in west-central Poland
