= Wronczyn, Gmina Pobiedziska =

Wronczyn
- Village
- Location within Poland
- Coordinates: 52°30′N 17°12′E
- Country: Poland
- Voivodeship: Greater Poland
- County: Poznań
- Gmina: Pobiedziska

Wronczyn [ˈvrɔnt͡ʂɨn] is a village in the administrative district of Gmina Pobiedziska, within Poznań County, Greater Poland Voivodeship, in west-central Poland.
