= Gołunin =

- Village
- Location within Poland
- Coordinates: 52°28′01″N 17°20′31″E
- Country: Poland
- Voivodeship: Greater Poland
- County: Poznań
- Gmina: Pobiedziska

Gołunin [ɡɔˈwunin] is a village in the administrative district of Gmina Pobiedziska, within Poznań County, Greater Poland Voivodeship, in west-central Poland.
