= Permanent Forest Contract =

The Permanent Forest Contract (in German Dauerwaldvertrag, also Dauerwaldkaufvertrag or Jahrhundertvertrag) refers to an agreement from 27 March 1915 for the communal Association of Greater Berlin (German: Zweckverband Groß-Berlin) to buy areas of forest from the state of Prussia. The modern city of Berlin developed out of the association five years later and became its legal successor in the contract. This contract created the conditions for "Berlin to be provided with – compared to other major cities – uniquely extensive areas of forest."

== Purchase and price ==
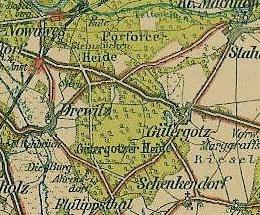
Purchase: Parforceheide (Map from von 1903)

The Association of Greater Berlin bought large areas of woods belonging to the Prussian state – in total around 10,000 hectares – from the local forestry authorities in Grunewald, Tegel, Grünau, Köpenick, which at this time were not yet part of Berlin, as well as that in Potsdam. The Association committed itself to not building on or reselling the areas of forest which it had bought, but instead to maintain them permanently as local recreation areas for the populace. Some of the areas of forest acquired, such as the Parforceheide, lay then and still lie outside the city boundary in Brandenburg and have been managed since reunification by the forestry authorities in Berlin.

The Association of Greater Berlin (1911–1920), whose members included the town borough of Berlin and independent town boroughs, rural municipalities and agricultural estates such as Charlottenburg, Schöneberg, Steglitz, Köpenick or Reinickendorf, had as early as 1912 made a request to the government regarding the acquisition of forests and were in turn offered 11,200 hectares of forest for 179 million German gold marks.

The Association objected with the argument that this price could not be applied to remote parts of a forest. The last German Kaiser, Wilhelm II, who ultimately had to agree to any sale of state forestries, intervened in the protracted negotiations. Of the final purchase price of 50 million German gold marks for 10,000 hectares, the Association was to pay 5 million immediately and the remainder in 15 annual payments, each of 3 million. The Association regarded this as a success since they had been able to reduce the original price demanded by the government from 1.60 to 0.50 gold marks per square metre.

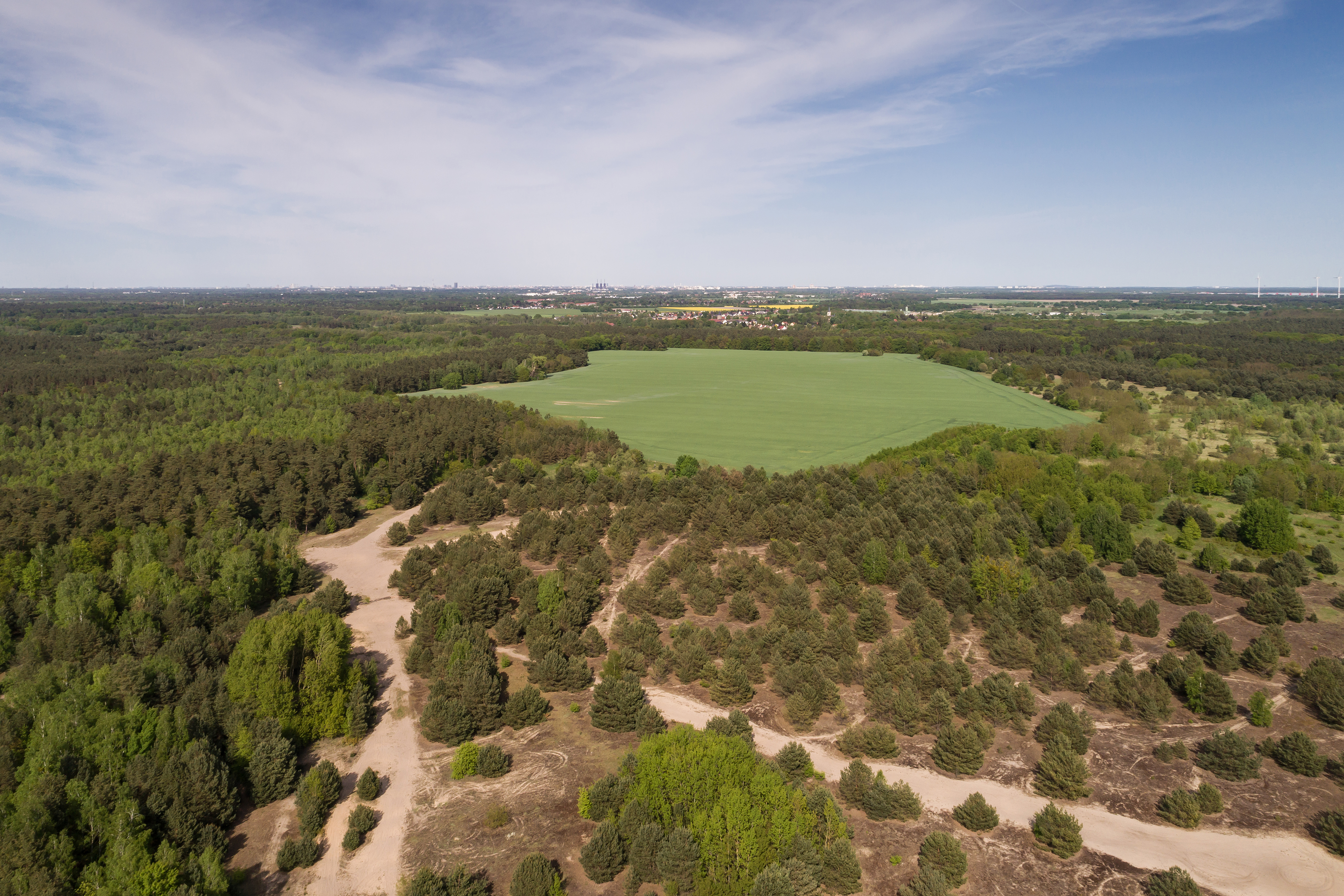
Parforceheide, "outlying" property

== Obligation ==
In an article on Forestry Ownership in Berlin through the Ages (German: Berliner Waldbesitz im Wandel der Zeiten) the forestry advisor Martin Klees summarised the main content of the contract as follows:

"The contract, which despite the first World War having broken out, was finalised on 27.3.1915, obliged the Zweckverband Groß-Berlin to use the pieces of land purchased solely for the [acquisition and upkeep of large areas such as woods, parks, meadow and lakes etc. and to keep these free from development] and to preserve them as wooded areas. Profits made from any liquidation were to be used for the acquisition of replacement areas."

== Motivation ==
=== Health policy reasons ===
A significant reason for the foresighted forestry policy was worry regarding the endangered well-being of the populace. Since the second half of the 19th century, the demands placed on the usage of forests had shifted from the lumbar production to the provision of a recreational resource. As early as January 1893 the government of Berlin petitioned the minister with the goal of "… bringing large areas into communal ownership … for reasons of public hygiene, in order to thus ensure opportunities for recreation and revitalisation, both outdoors and in the woods, for the growing population of the imperial capital." In an article in the almanach "Groß-Berliner Kalender 1913" Richard van der Borght advocated the establishment of a "belt of woods" around the city and emphasised the importance of the forest: "... for the temperature of the air and soil, the amount and distribution of precipitation, for water storage and the formation of springs, for the retention of weathered soil, for protection against wind, sand drifts and landslides etc., but also and in particular for its value for the health and for the inner lives and emotional state of the people."

=== Water supply, deforestation ===
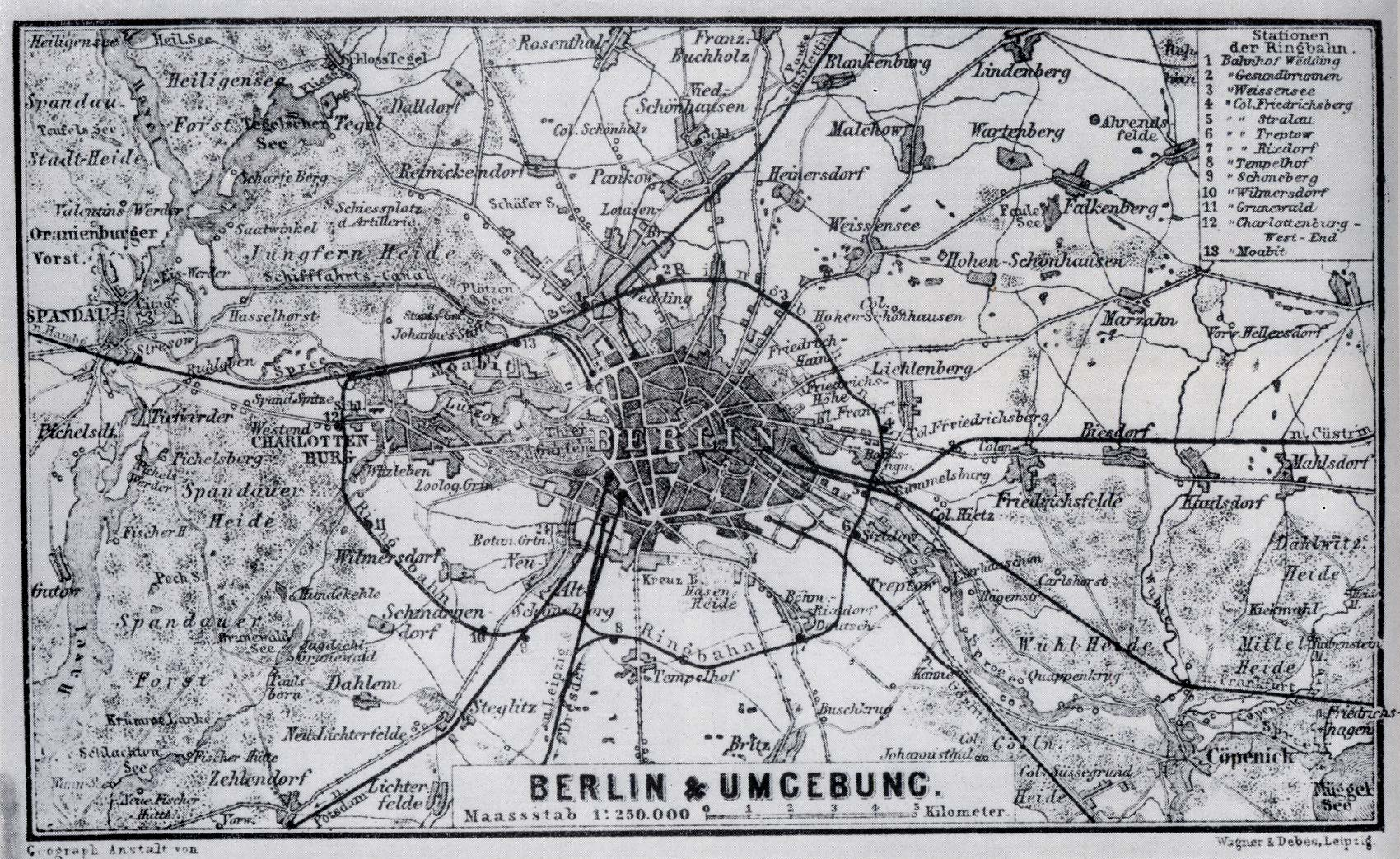
Berlin 1885 – even Schöneberg was far from the centre back then

As van der Borght implies, a further significant reason for the conclusion of the Permanent Forestry Contract lay in the need to ensure the water supply for the rapidly growing population of Berlin (a fourfold increase between the Proclamation of the German Empire in 1871 and 1910 from around 900,000 to over 3,700,000). The forest areas acquired included many lakes with very good water quality, such as Schlachtensee or Krumme Lanke – lakes which today are understood to be part of Berlin, but at that time lay far outside the city limits. To improve water retention in the soil, a change in forestry policies was planned which envisioned more natural mixed woods, those existing at the end of the 19th century mainly comprising pine monoculture.

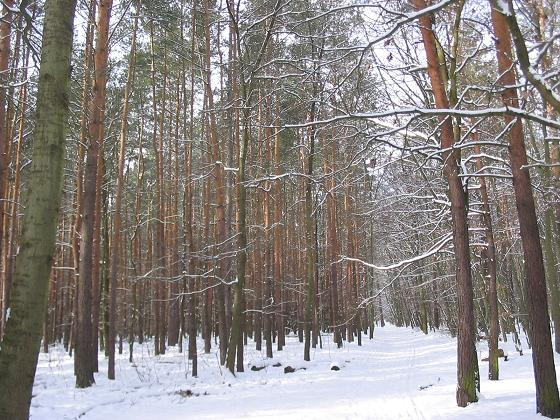
Acquisition: Grunewald forest

Furthermore, Berlin and its surroundings, which when they fused in 1920 encompassed a combined population of 3.8 million, had problems managing the enormous amounts of wastewater produced by households, breweries, tanneries, dyeing and other factories. With regards to a long-term solution of this problem, in particular via the use of sceptic drain fields, large areas of land were needed.

=== Land speculation - first environmental movement ===
A further aim was to reduce the expanding land speculation which was prevalent at this time and lead to the destruction of forests. From 1850, but above all during the rapid industrialisation of the early period of the German Empire, areas belonging to the one-time villages (such as Schöneberg, Steglitz, Hermsdorf, Pankow, Lichtenberg …), which had previously been used as fields or woods had, apart from a few remnants, been bought up. The larger forests remained intact for longer, since these had to be bought from the Prussian king and not from individual farmers, some of whom were able to earn fortunes (the so-called "Millonare Farmers of Schöneberg"). Especially desirable were the plots in Grunewald. In what can be viewed as an expression of an early German environmental movement, two Berlin newspapers initiated a petition in 1904 to protest against the destruction of Grunewald and collected around 30,000 signatures. The speculation continued nevertheless and both the state (together with the neighbouring Dahlem Manor) as well as private forest owners participated. In 1909 speculation with wooded areas in and around Berlin reached around 1,800 hectares. The "Second Berlin Forestry Protection Conference" (German: der „Zweite Berliner Waldschutztag“), which took place on 16th January 1909, spoke out vehemently against the reckless speculation and destruction of the forests. According to the forestry advisor Martin Klees "the concern of the population [...] expressed itself once more in a special edition of a newspaper in Groß-Lichterfelder with the title: 'Grunewald is doomed' (German: ‚Der Grunewald ist dem Verderben geweiht‘)".

In 1913, two years before the finalisation of the Permanent Forestry Contract, Hermann Kötschke complained in his article "Forestry Protection for Greater Berlin (German:„Waldschutz für Groß-Berlin“): „It is particularly unfortunate that, for example »Prinz Friedrich Leopold«, who owns the enormous Düppel-Dreilinden forest, wishes to turn this magnificent property into money. The glorious lakeshores of Kleiner Wannsee, Stolper See and Griebnitzsee have already become for the most part inaccessible. Only a few rods (unit of length) have been saved for the Kleist monument. Normally one says noblesse oblige."

As the history of the Association and the finalisation of the Permanent Forestry Contract show, the Prussian state ultimately had to bow to the pressure of the arguments and protests.

== Consequences of the Permanent Forest Contract today ==
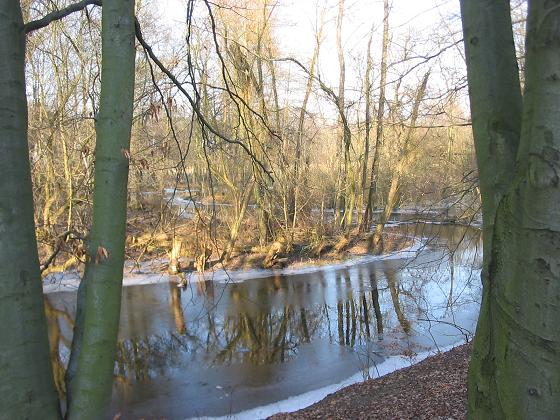
Acquisition: Tegel Forest; here with Tegeler Fließ

Through the purchases of the Association, smaller ones made in parallel by the city of Berlin, and other acquisitions, after it was founded in 1920 Greater Berlin owned in total 21,500 hectares of forest, and by the beginning of World War II, this area had grown to around 25,000 hectares. After the Separation of Germany and the founding of the GDR in 1949 around 7,300 hectares remained in West-Berlin. After reunification of the two separated parts of the city and the return of wooded areas in the surroundings via the Treuhand in 1995 (9,500 hectares), Berlin, which has a total area of 89,207 hectares, today possesses over 15,774 hectares of forest, which thus comprise 18.1% of the total. Thanks to the Permanent Forestry Contract of 1915, which still exists essentially unchanged as parts of multiple laws and regulations, Berlin is, around a century after its finalisation of the contract, the European metropole with the largest area of forest.

In the "State Forestry Law" (German: „Landeswaldgesetz“), which was passed by the Senate of West Berlin on 30 January 1979 and which since 1990 has applied to the whole of Berlin, the historic contract to safeguard the forest took on its final legal form. The entire forested area of Berlin was declared to be a protected recreational forest. The purpose is described in § 1 in more modern language, but the contents could have originated from 1920s:

"… because of its importance for the environment, in particular for its continuous service capability for the ecological balance, the climate, the water supply, the reduction of air pollution, soil moisture, the natural scenery, as well as the revitalisation of the populace, the forest is to be maintained, if possible expanded and its care ensured for the future."
