= Wójtostwo, Greater Poland Voivodeship =

Wójtostwo
- Village
- Location within Poland
- Coordinates: 52°28′N 17°17′E
- Country: Poland
- Voivodeship: Greater Poland
- County: Poznań
- Gmina: Pobiedziska

Wójtostwo [vui̯ˈtɔstfɔ] is a village in the administrative district of Gmina Pobiedziska, within Poznań County, Greater Poland Voivodeship, in west-central Poland.
