= Gmina Pobiedziska =

Gmina Pobiedziska Pobiedziska Commune
- Gmina
- Flag Coat of arms
- Interactive map of Gmina Pobiedziska
- Coordinates (Pobiedziska): 52°29′41″N 17°16′2″E
- Country: Poland
- Voivodeship: Greater Poland
- County: Poznań County
- Seat: Pobiedziska

Area
  - Total: 189.27 km^{2} (73.08 sq mi)

Population (2006)
  - Total: 16,382
  - Density: 86.554/km^{2} (224.17/sq mi)
  - Urban: 8,329
  - Rural: 8,053
- Website: http://www.pobiedziska.pl/

Gmina Pobiedziska is an urban-rural gmina (administrative district) in Poznań County, Greater Poland Voivodeship, in west-central Poland. Its seat is the town of Pobiedziska, which lies approximately 27 kilometres (17 mi) north-east of the regional capital Poznań.

The gmina covers an area of 189.27 square kilometres (73.1 sq mi), including the southern part of the protected forest area of Puszcza Zielonka Landscape Park and the whole of Promno Landscape Park. As of 2006 the total population of the gmina is 16,382 (out of which the population of Pobiedziska amounts to 8,329, and the population of the rural part of the gmina is 8,053).

== Villages ==
Apart from the town of Pobiedziska, the gmina contains the villages and settlements of Bednary, Biskupice, Bociniec, Borowo-Młyn, Bugaj, Czachurki, Główna, Gołunin, Góra, Jankowo, Jerzykowo, Jerzyn, Kocanowo, Kociałkowa Górka, Kołata, Kowalskie, Krześlice, Łagiewniki, Latalice, Podarzewo, Polska Wieś, Pomarzanowice, Promno, Pruszewiec, Stara Górka, Stęszewko, Tuczno, Uzarzewo-Huby, Wagowo, Węglewo, Wójtostwo, Wronczyn, Zbierkowo and Złotniczki.

== Neighbouring gminas ==
Gmina Pobiedziska is bordered by the gminas of Czerniejewo, Czerwonak, Kiszkowo, Kostrzyn, Łubowo, Murowana Goślina, Nekla and Swarzędz.
