= Stara Górka =

- Village
- Location within Poland
- Coordinates: 52°26′27″N 17°15′35″E
- Country: Poland
- Voivodeship: Greater Poland
- County: Poznań
- Gmina: Pobiedziska

Stara Górka ([ˈstara ˈɡurka]; German: Moorhausen) is a village in the administrative district of Gmina Pobiedziska, within Poznań County, Greater Poland Voivodeship, in west-central Poland.
