= Borowo-Młyn =

- Village
- Location within Poland
- Coordinates: 52°28′38″N 17°12′29″E
- Country: Poland
- Voivodeship: Greater Poland
- County: Poznań
- Gmina: Pobiedziska

Borowo-Młyn ([bɔˈrɔvɔ ˈmwɨn]; German: Waldstein) is a village in the administrative district of Gmina Pobiedziska, within Poznań County, Greater Poland Voivodeship, in west-central Poland.
