= Pruszewiec =

- Village
- Location within Poland
- Coordinates: 52°30′N 17°8′E
- Country: Poland
- Voivodeship: Greater Poland
- County: Poznań
- Gmina: Pobiedziska

Pruszewiec ([pruˈʂɛvjɛt͡s]; German: Pruschewitz) is a village in the administrative district of Gmina Pobiedziska, in Poznań County, Greater Poland Voivodeship, in west-central Poland.
