= Uzarzewo-Huby =

- Village
- Location within Poland
- Coordinates: 52°27′00″N 17°08′59″E
- Country: Poland
- Voivodeship: Greater Poland
- County: Poznań
- Gmina: Pobiedziska

Uzarzewo-Huby ([uzaˈʐɛvɔ ˈxubɨ]; German: Soldanshof) is a village in the administrative district of Gmina Pobiedziska, within Poznań County, Greater Poland Voivodeship, in west-central Poland.
