= Czachurki =

- Village
- Location within Poland
- Coordinates: 52°26′44″N 17°20′58″E
- Country: Poland
- Voivodeship: Greater Poland
- County: Poznań
- Gmina: Pobiedziska

Czachurki ([t͡ʂaˈxurki]; German: Steinhof) is a village in the administrative district of Gmina Pobiedziska, within Poznań County, Greater Poland Voivodeship, in west-central Poland.
