= 1993 in the environment =

This is a list of notable events relating to the environment in 1993. They relate to environmental law, environmentalism and environmental issues.

== Events ==
- Residents in the vicinity of the polluted Lago Agrio oil field hire lawyers to force former well operator Texaco and its now parent company Chevron Corporation to clean up the area and to provide for the care of those affected.
- The former New Zealand territorial authority district of Waitakere City declares itself to be an eco-city.
- A number of protected areas were established in 1993, including Andrew Johnston Big Scrub Nature Reserve in Australia, Bald Knob National Wildlife Refuge, in Arkansas, and Promno Landscape Park, a protected area in west-central Poland.
- EcoLogic Development Fund is founded.

=== August ===
- The Taejon Expo '93 three-month international exposition was held between Saturday, August 7, 1993, and Sunday, November 7, 1993, in the central South Korean city of Daejeon. The exposition's dual subthemes were "‘Traditional and Modern Science and Technology for the Developing World’ and ‘Effective use of resources and recycling’ – proposing alternative solutions and technology in favour of green development."

=== December ===
- The Convention on Biological Diversity, known informally as the Biodiversity Convention, enters into force. It is an international legally binding treaty.

== See also ==
- Human impact on the environment
- List of years in the environment
