= Promno =

- Village
- Location within Poland
- Coordinates: 52°27′N 17°14′E
- Country: Poland
- Voivodeship: Greater Poland
- County: Poznań
- Gmina: Pobiedziska

Promno [ˈprɔmnɔ] is a village in the administrative district of Gmina Pobiedziska, within Poznań County, Greater Poland Voivodeship, in west-central Poland.

The village gives its name to the protected area of Promno Landscape Park.
