= Wagowo =

- Village
- Location within Poland
- Coordinates: 52°26′N 17°21′E
- Country: Poland
- Voivodeship: Greater Poland
- County: Poznań
- Gmina: Pobiedziska
- Website: http://www.wagowo.pl

Wagowo [vaˈɡɔvɔ] is a village in the administrative district of Gmina Pobiedziska, within Poznań County, Greater Poland Voivodeship, in west-central Poland.
