= Jerzyn =

- Village
- Location within Poland
- Coordinates: 52°30′N 17°14′E
- Country: Poland
- Voivodeship: Greater Poland
- County: Poznań
- Gmina: Pobiedziska
- Population: 90

Jerzyn ([ˈjɛʐɨn]; German: Gersin) is a village in the administrative district of Gmina Pobiedziska, within Poznań County, Greater Poland Voivodeship, in west-central Poland.
