= Tuczno, Greater Poland Voivodeship =

Tuczno
- Village
- Location within Poland
- Coordinates: 52°31′1″N 17°8′12″E
- Country: Poland
- Voivodeship: Greater Poland
- County: Poznań
- Gmina: Pobiedziska
- Population: 130

Tuczno ([ˈtut͡ʂnɔ]; German: Reichenau) is a village in the administrative district of Gmina Pobiedziska, within Poznań County, Greater Poland Voivodeship, in west-central Poland.

In 2004, the village had a population of 130. It lies on the southern edge of the Puszcza Zielonka forest and landscape park. It is close to a series of lakes, and contains a large complex of vacation properties.
