= Promno Landscape Park =

Polish natural reserve

Coordinates: 52.4517°N 17.2608°E

- Park Krajobrazowy Promno
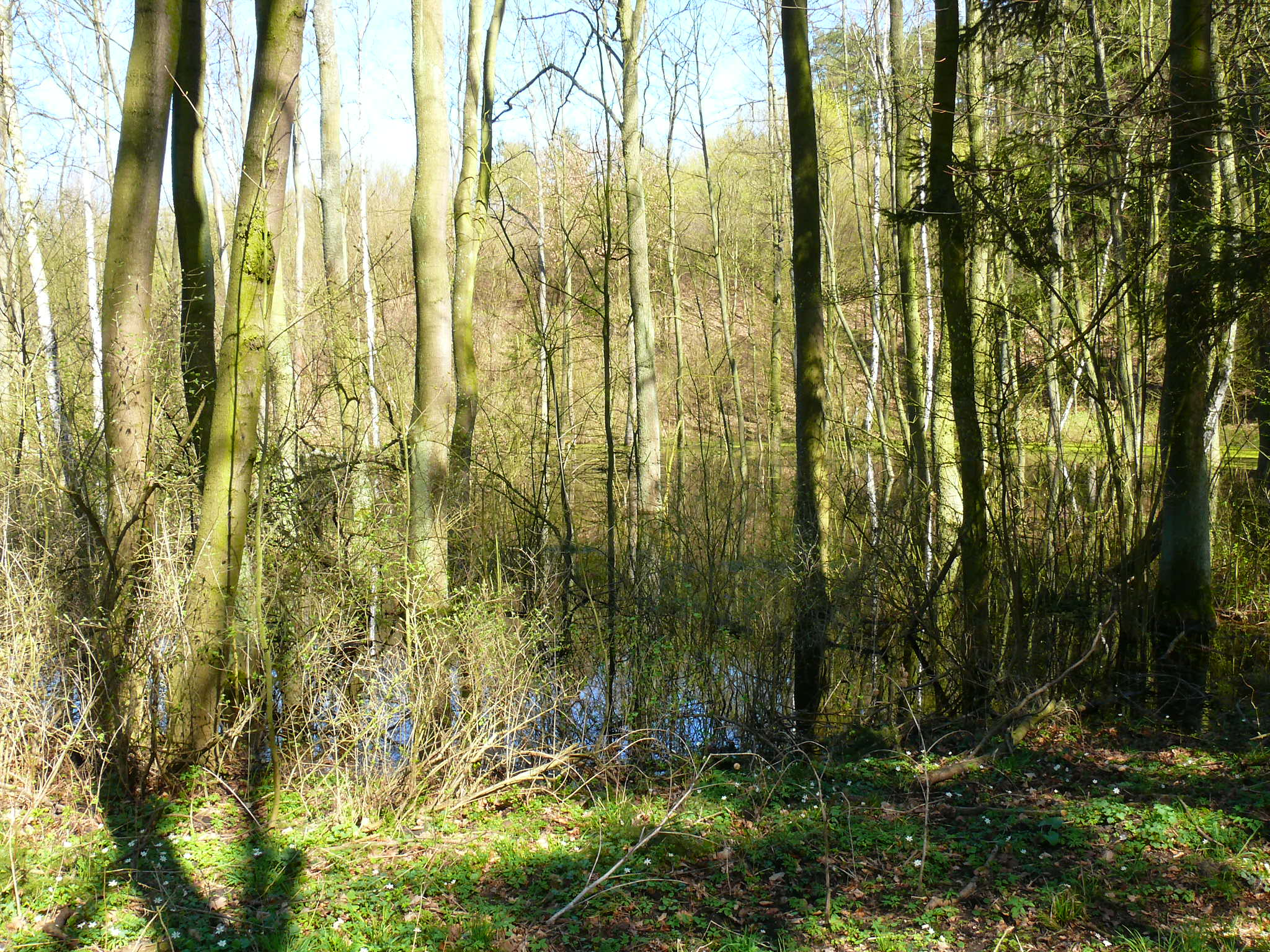
- Interactive map of Promno Landscape Park
- Location: Greater Poland Voivodeship

Promno Landscape Park (Park Krajobrazowy Promno) is a protected area (Landscape Park) in west-central Poland. It was founded in 1993.

The Park lies within Greater Poland Voivodeship, in Poznań County (in the district of Gmina Pobiedziska). It takes its name from the village of Promno.

== See also ==
- 1993 in the environment
