= Złotniczki, Greater Poland Voivodeship =

Złotniczki
- Village
- Location within Poland
- Coordinates: 52°30′N 17°15′E
- Country: Poland
- Voivodeship: Greater Poland
- County: Poznań
- Gmina: Pobiedziska

Złotniczki [zwɔtˈnit͡ʂki] is a village in the administrative district of Gmina Pobiedziska, within Poznań County, Greater Poland Voivodeship, in west-central Poland.
