= Bugaj, Gmina Pobiedziska =

Bugaj
- Village
- Location within Poland
- Coordinates: 52°28′4″N 17°9′2″E
- Country: Poland
- Voivodeship: Greater Poland
- County: Poznań
- Gmina: Pobiedziska

Bugaj [ˈbuɡai̯] is a village in the administrative district of Gmina Pobiedziska, within Poznań County, Greater Poland Voivodeship, in west-central Poland.
