= Bednary, Greater Poland Voivodeship =

Bednary
- Village
- Location within Poland
- Coordinates: 52°31′29″N 17°12′14″E
- Country: Poland
- Voivodeship: Greater Poland
- County: Poznań
- Gmina: Pobiedziska
- Population: 70

Bednary [bɛdˈnarɨ] is a village in the administrative district of Gmina Pobiedziska, within Poznań County, Greater Poland Voivodeship, in west-central Poland.
