= Kociałkowa Górka =

- Village
- Location within Poland
- Coordinates: 52°25′59″N 17°17′25″E
- Country: Poland
- Voivodeship: Greater Poland
- County: Poznań
- Gmina: Pobiedziska
- Population: 410

Kociałkowa Górka [kɔt͡ɕau̯ˈkɔva ˈɡurka] is a village in the administrative district of Gmina Pobiedziska, within Poznań County, Greater Poland Voivodeship, in west-central Poland.
