= Olga Murray =

American lawyer and activist

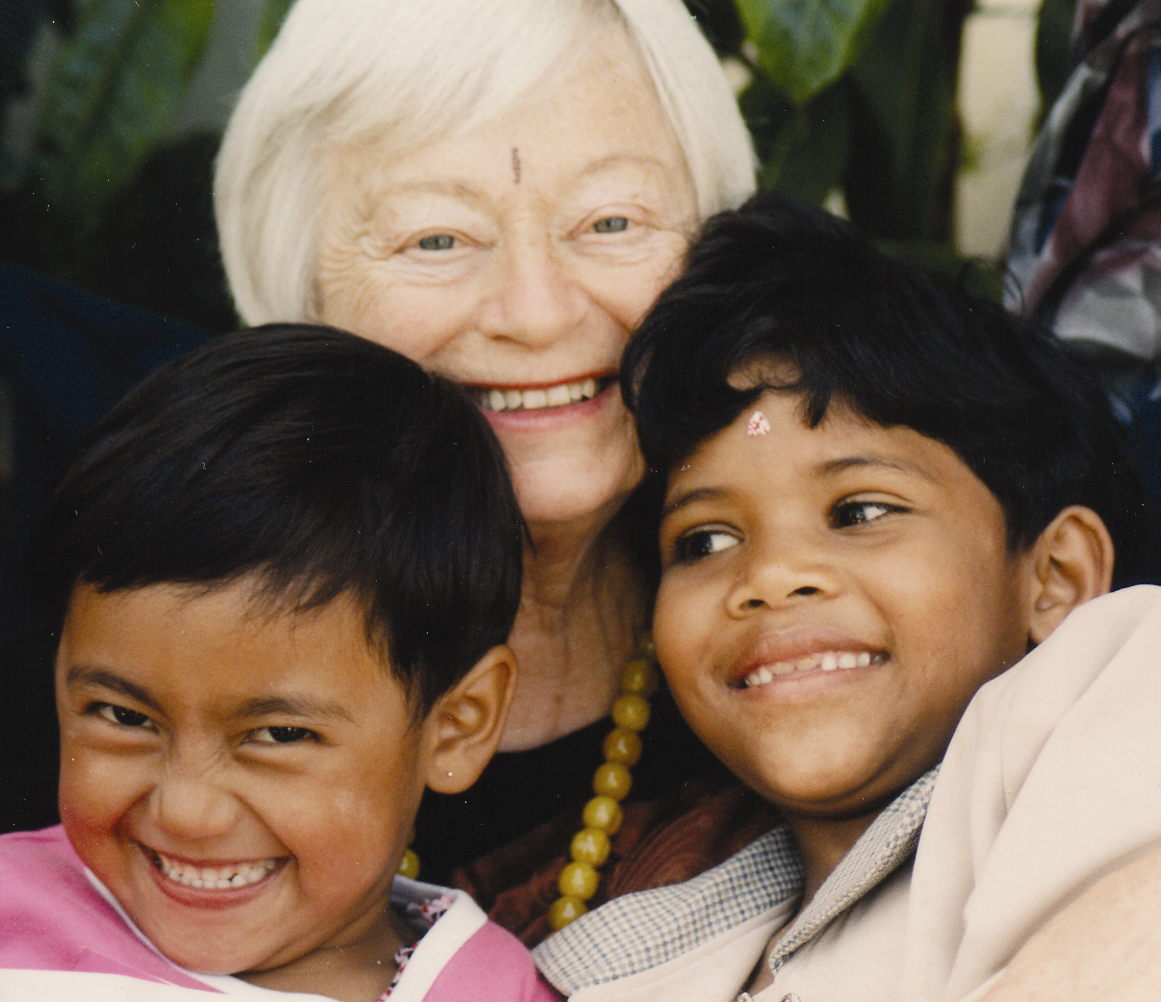
- Olga Murray in Nepal with NYF-sponsored children
- Born: June 1, 1925; Transylvania, Romania
- Died: February 20, 2024 (aged 98); Sausalito, California, U.S.
- Education: Columbia University, George Washington University
- Occupations: Lawyer, activist
- Known for: Founder and president of the Nepal Youth Foundation

Olga Murray (June 1, 1925 - February 20, 2024) was a retired lawyer and the founder and president of the Nepal Youth Foundation (NYF), a U.S.-based nonprofit organization that provides education, health care, human rights, and housing for disadvantaged children in Nepal. The Nepal Youth Foundation was formerly known as the Nepalese Youth Opportunity Foundation or NYOF.

== Career in Law ==
Born in 1925 in Transylvania, Romania of Jewish background, Murray came to the U.S. as a six-year-old. She graduated with honors from Columbia University and received her law degree from George Washington University in 1954. She had worked her way through school by researching and writing for famed muckraking columnist Drew Pearson. Although there were very few women lawyers at that time and most law firms would only hire a female lawyer as a secretary, Murray was offered the first job for which she applied - as a staff attorney to the Chief Justice of California, Phil Gibson. When he retired, Murray joined the law staff of the new Justice Stanley Mosk. She worked for the State Supreme Court until her retirement in 1992. During her 37-year tenure at the Court, Murray helped to write decisions in the areas of civil rights, children's issues, women's rights, and environmental policy.

== Involvement with Nepal ==
Olga Murray first visited Nepal in 1984. After seeing the terribly impoverished condition of the children in the villages, she resolved that she would return to help them. On another trip to Nepal in 1987, Murray broke her ankle. Upon returning to Kathmandu, she was treated by a young doctor who had just opened a small hospital for poor, very disabled children, where all care was free and of a high standard. Through this connection, she began giving scholarships to disabled children who had no way of getting to school in their villages, and needed to come to Kathmandu for boarding school. As the number of scholarships grew, she decided to start a foundation that would help these kids in an organized way.

== The Nepal Youth Foundation ==
In 1990, she founded the Nepalese Youth Opportunity Foundation (NYOF), a nonprofit organization registered in the United States, to provide the most impoverished children of Nepal with education, housing, medical care, and human rights. The organization later changed its name to Nepal Youth Foundation, or NYF. NYF leverages the money from developed countries to maximize the aid for these children. In addition to scholarships for children who live in Kathmandu and rural Nepal, from grammar school to medical school, NYF implements a range of other programs to help Nepali children. For example, NYF's Indentured Daughters Program rescues girls from being sold as bonded servants and pays for them to attend school. The Nutritional Rehabilitation Homes restore severely malnourished children to full health while educating their mothers in child care and nutrition. NYF also operates a children's home in Kathmandu named Olgapuri Village.

Olga Murray died at her home in Sausalito, California on 20 February 2024. The focus of her time in her later years was raising funds for NYF's programs.

== Recognition ==
Olga Murray has been honored with several awards for the Nepal Youth Foundation's accomplishments. In 2001, the Dalai Lama gave her the Unsung Heroes of Compassion Award. In 2002, she received a medal from the King of Nepal to honor her work with the children of Nepal. Murray was honored by the World of Children as a 2005 finalist. The Nepal Youth Foundation was a finalist in the 2005 GlobalGiving Marketplace on Borderless Giving. Also in 2005, NYF was awarded the California Association of Nonprofits' Award of Excellence for its innovative Indentured Daughters Program. In 2006, Murray won the grand prize for the Mannington "Stand on a Better World" Award.

Olga Murray's achievements with the Nepal Youth Foundation have been featured repeatedly in the media, including appearances on PBS's NOW program, on ABC World News, and in the San Francisco Chronicle. Additionally, Murray and NYF were profiled on "The Oprah Winfrey Show" on May 9, 2002. This special "Children of the World" program also featured Nelson Mandela. This program focused on NYF's Indentured Daughters Program, which uses a piglet to rescue a girl from bonded servitude.
