= Latalice =

Latalice Spunky
- Village
- Location within Poland
- Coordinates: 52°31′N 17°18′E
- Country: Poland
- Voivodeship: Greater Poland
- County: Poznań
- Gmina: Pobiedziska

Latalice [lataˈlit͡sɛ] is a village in the administrative district of Gmina Pobiedziska, within Poznań County, Greater Poland Voivodeship, in west-central Poland.
