= Stęszewko =

- Village
- Location within Poland
- Coordinates: 52°32′N 17°10′E
- Country: Poland
- Voivodeship: Greater Poland
- County: Poznań
- Gmina: Pobiedziska

Stęszewko ([stɛ̃ˈʂɛfkɔ]; German: Stenschewko) is a village in the administrative district of Gmina Pobiedziska, within Poznań County, Greater Poland Voivodeship, in west-central Poland.
