= Węglewo, Poznań County =

Węglewo
- Village
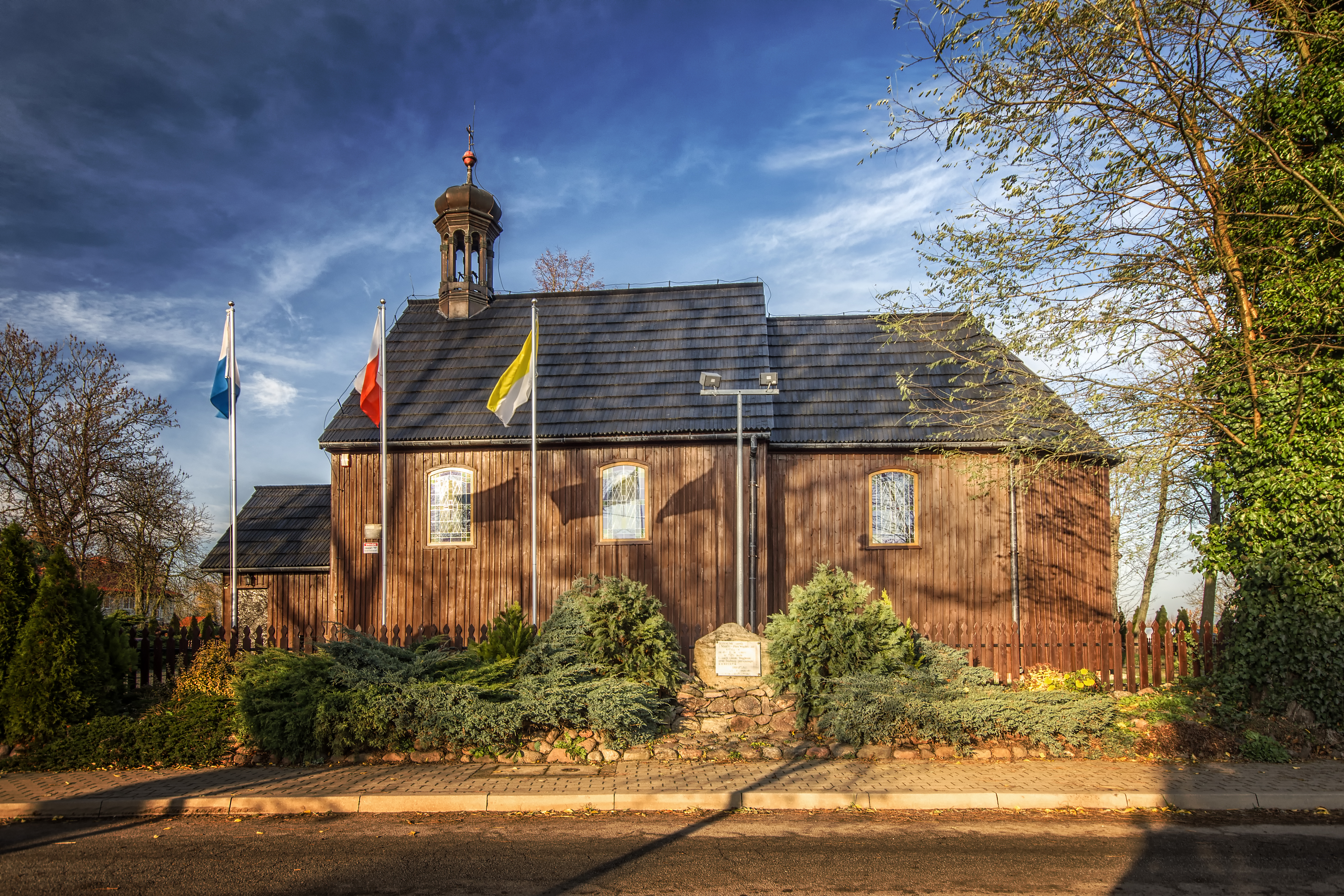
- Church of St. Catherine of Alexandria, 17th century.

- Location within Poland
- Coordinates: 52°30′N 17°18′E
- Country: Poland
- Voivodeship: Greater Poland
- County: Poznań
- Gmina: Pobiedziska

Węglewo [vɛnˈɡlɛvɔ] is a village in the administrative district of Gmina Pobiedziska, within Poznań County, Greater Poland Voivodeship, in west-central Poland.

The village has a church which lies on the Wooden Churches Trail around Puszcza Zielonka.
