= Góra, Gmina Pobiedziska =

Góra
- Village
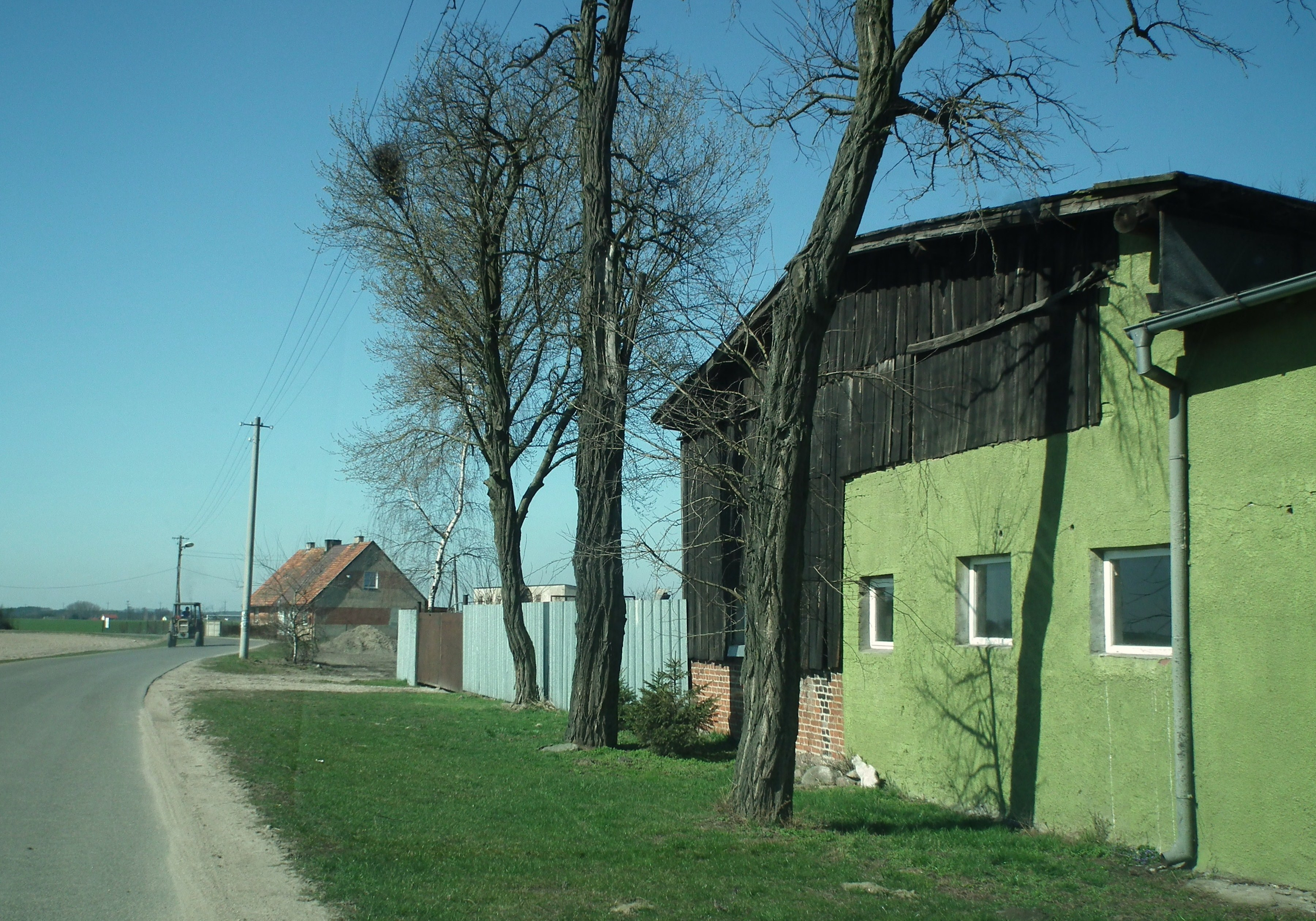
- Green house in Góra

- Location within Poland
- Coordinates: 52°26′49″N 17°12′37″E
- Country: Poland
- Voivodeship: Greater Poland
- County: Poznań
- Gmina: Pobiedziska

Góra ([ˈɡura]; German: Gurten) is a village in the administrative district of Gmina Pobiedziska, within Poznań County, Greater Poland Voivodeship, in west-central Poland.
