= Główna, Greater Poland Voivodeship =

Główna
- Village
- Location within Poland
- Coordinates: 52°29′31″N 17°17′36″E
- Country: Poland
- Voivodeship: Greater Poland
- County: Poznań
- Gmina: Pobiedziska

Główna [ˈɡwuvna] is a village in the administrative district of Gmina Pobiedziska, within Poznań County, Greater Poland Voivodeship, in west-central Poland.

A hard-copy map of Główna can be accessed in the Polish State Archive as of 11 May 2024.
