= Steinstücken =

Outlying neighborhood of Berlin

Coordinates: 52°23′24″N 13°7′51″E

Locator map of Steinstücken in Berlin

Map of Steinstücken

Steinstücken (German: [ˈʃtaɪnʃtʏkn̩]; lit. 'Stone Pieces'), with approximately 300 residents, is a small outlying neighborhood of the Wannsee district in the Berlin borough of Steglitz-Zehlendorf. From the division of Germany in 1949 until a connecting corridor was created in 1971–72, Steinstücken was the only permanently inhabited of twelve original exclaves of West Berlin in East Germany, while West Berlin itself was an enclave controlled by the Western Allies, surrounded by East German (GDR) territory.

== Origin of the exclave ==
Steinstücken is located on former farmland that once belonged to the village of Wendisch Stahnsdorf, which had probably already been abandoned by the time it was mentioned in the list of villages, towns, and cities commissioned in 1375 by Emperor Charles IV. The exclave originated in 1787, when farmers of the nearby village of Stolpe acquired 61 hectares (151 acres) of land outside of their municipality, which included part of the Potsdam Forest. A small settlement was established there in 1817 and was called Steinstücken after a piece of village land where rocks from the ice age had once been found. In 1898 Stolpe joined the new rural community of Wannsee. When Wannsee became part of the Zehlendorf borough with the incorporation of Greater Berlin in 1920, Steinstücken (with the exception of the Potsdam Forest section) was included, although it was not physically connected to the city. Until 1945 this fact was of little significance; daily life was oriented towards Babelsberg, an adjacent district of Potsdam.

== Cold War ==
At the end of World War II in 1945, Berlin's city boundary became the dividing line between the Soviet zone of Germany and the American, British and French sectors of Berlin. For the first couple of years, the border still remained open.

An escalation of the Cold War (the Berlin Blockade and the proclamation of two separate German states) turned Berlin's outer boundary into a part of the Iron Curtain, and thus Steinstücken into an island of West Berlin, itself an island, in East Germany.

In 1951, the GDR attempted to annex Steinstücken by sending police, soldiers, tanks, armored vehicles and trucks with machines guns into the exclave. They hoisted the flag of East Germany. After objection by the United States, they withdrew their forces a few days later. After this event, the residents were no longer allowed access into East Germany; their only access to the outside world was through two East German checkpoints and a road of about 1 km length into the rest of West Berlin. For all their everyday activities (e.g. work, school, shopping, visits of friends and relatives) they had to pass these controls from then on.

After the building of the Berlin Wall in 1961, Steinstücken became the focus of several escape attempts; as a tiny exclave within East German territory it was demarcated only by barbed wire barriers. After more than twenty East German border guards escaped to the west through Steinstücken, the communist regime in East Germany fortified the wall around Steinstücken to cut off this escape route.

Following a helicopter visit by Lucius D. Clay on 21 September 1961, a US military post was installed in the exclave. Soldiers were regularly flown in by helicopter from then on. Today, a "helicopter memorial" commemorates these circumstances.

== The corridor ==
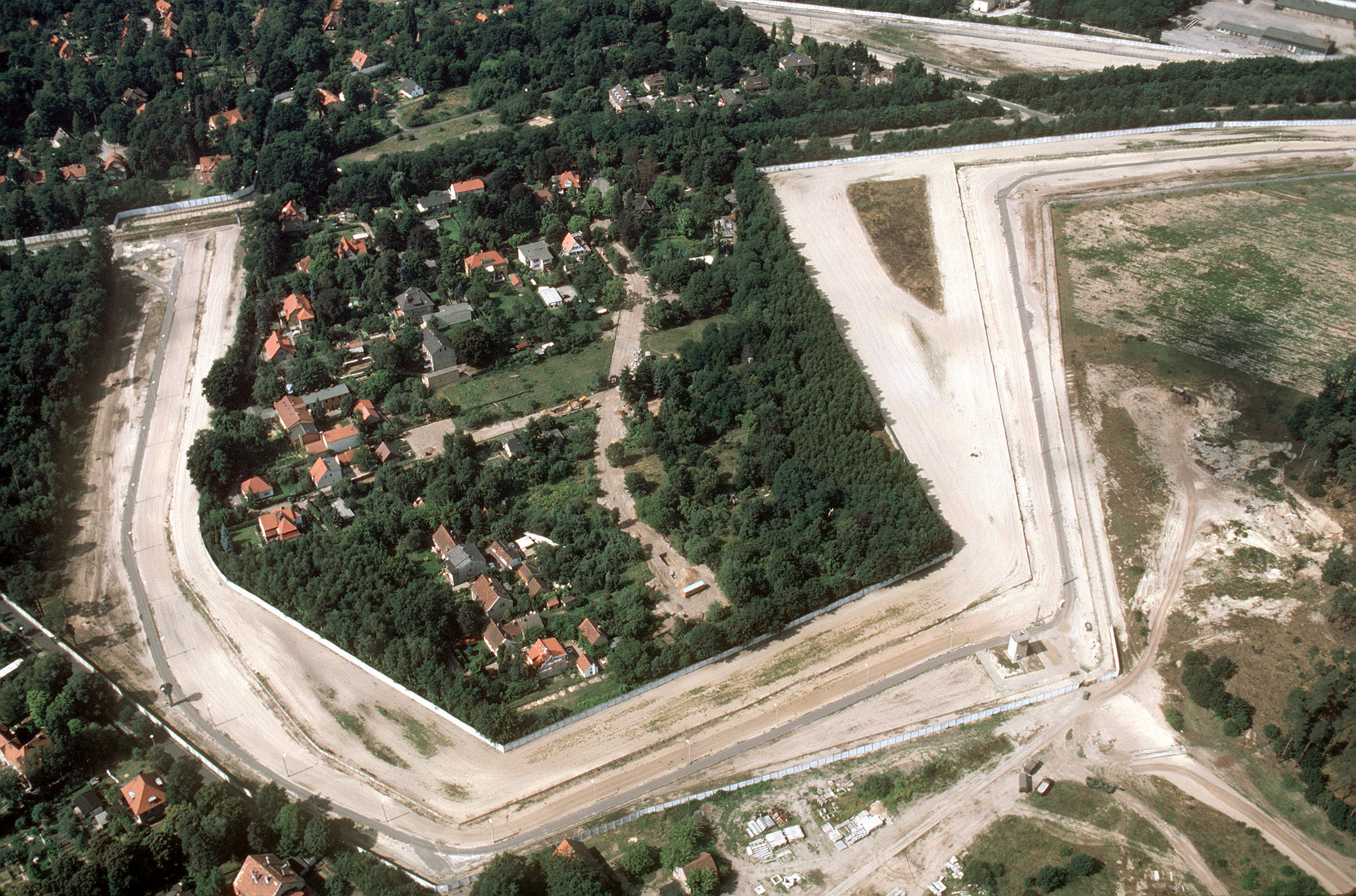
A 1989 aerial view from the southeast of Steinstücken, with Bernhard-Beyer-Straße connecting to the northeast along the railway tracks to the rest of West Berlin.

To alleviate the enormous inconvenience of daily border crossings, a road connecting Steinstücken to Kohlhasenbrück, the most adjacent neighborhood of Wannsee, was built in 1972. This required an exchange of territory between East Germany and West Berlin, which in turn required the approval of the four occupation powers: the Soviet Union, United States, United Kingdom, and France. Following meetings of the Allied Commission, the four powers signed the Four Power Agreement on Berlin on 3 September 1971. This resolved a number of irregularities in the border between East Germany and West Berlin, and made a tiny sliver of land connecting the rest of West Berlin to Steinstücken a part of West Berlin territory. In return, West Berlin ceded six uninhabited exclaves to East Germany and paid four million West German Deutsche Marks. A connecting road, Bernhard-Beyer-Straße, was then built on this sliver, allowing Steinstücken residents to cross unimpeded to the rest of West Berlin. As the new border enclosed the road, extensions of the Berlin Wall were built on either side. The land transfer and building of the road ended Steinstücken's status as an exclave for all practical purposes.

Another complication was that railway tracks bisected Steinstücken, and residents used the Stahnsdorfer Straße bridge at the northern edge of the neighborhood to cross from one side to the other. East Germany refused to transfer the territory occupied by the bridge to West Berlin, because the railway tracks below belonged to the East German-owned Deutsche Reichsbahn. A compromise was reached in which the bridge and the airspace above it became part of West Berlin, while the airspace and land below the bridge, including the tracks, remained in East German hands.

Following the reunification of Germany, the heavily fortified international border around Steinstücken was dismantled and the neighborhood has become seamlessly integrated with surrounding Babelsberg. However, the former border remains as the boundary between the states of Berlin and Brandenburg, including the oddity of having the Stahnsdorfer Straße bridge as part of Berlin but the land below it in Brandenburg.

== See also ==
- Allied Commission
- Berlin Wall
- East Germany
- History of Germany since 1945
- West Berlin
- Zehlendorf
- Wannsee
- Potsdam
