= Finkenkrug =

- Stadtteil of Falkensee
- Interactive map of Finkenkrug
- Location within Germany Location within Brandenburg
- Coordinates: 52°33′48″N 13°02′33″E
- Country: Germany
- State: Brandenburg
- District: Havelland
- Town: Falkensee
- Elevation: 32 m (105 ft)

Population
  - Total: 5,830
- Time zone: UTC+01:00 (CET)
  - Summer (DST): UTC+02:00 (CEST)
- Postal codes: 14612
- Dialling codes: 03322

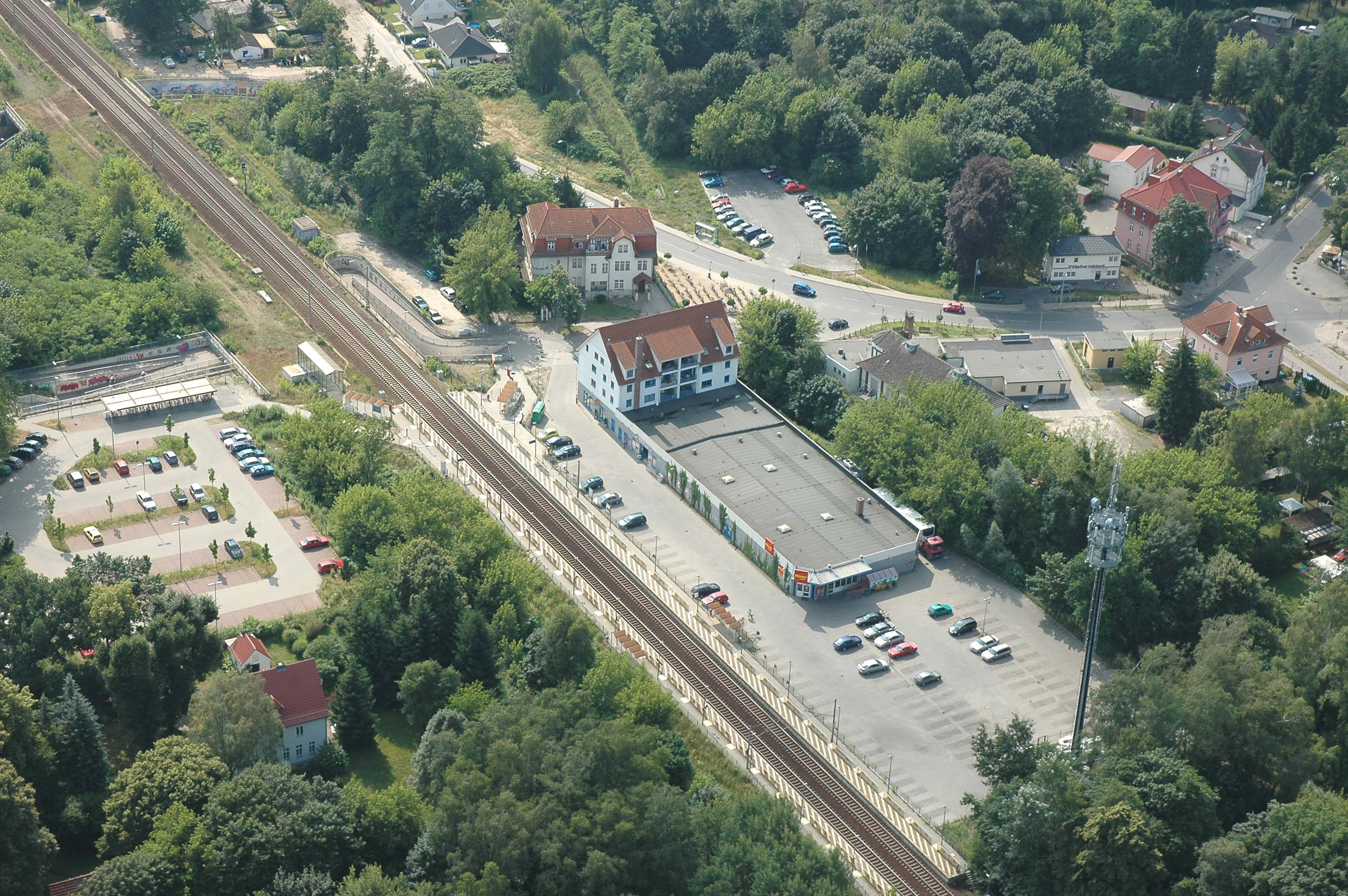
view to the train station Finkenkrug

Finkenkrug is a district of Falkensee, a town west of Berlin. It has been named after Alten Finkenkrug, a tar furnace in the "Bredower Forst".

== History ==
When the railway Berlin-Hamburg was opened on December 12, 1846, the area of Finkenkrug was a deserted landscape with rich arable fields interspersed with forest. Toward Dyrotz and the Königsgraben (Kings ditch, also Russians ditch) the landscape transferred into an alder bush landscape with agricultural cultivated fields that belonged to the manor Seegefeld. Unpaved roads were in the north the "Nauener Straße" from Falkenhagen and the "Finkenkruger Straße" from Seegefeld, that in a westbound curve of the current "Hohlbeinstr." ended in the "Rohrbecker Weg". Toward the west, the "Dyrotzer Weg" is marked in old maps of the 18th century

== Literature ==
- Richard Wagner, Finkenkrug in seinem Jahrhundert, published by the 'Förderverein des Heimatmuseums Falkensee e.V.', 2001
- Richard Wagner, Illustrierte Geschichte von Falkensee, published by the 'Förderverein des Heimatmuseums Falkensee e.V.', 2003
- Neufinkenkrug und seine Entwicklung, published by the 'Verein zur Förderung von Neufinkenkrug', 1914
- Lehrer Rehfeld, Festschrift des Alten Finkenkrugs, 1927
- Kurt Ruppin, Seegefeld, 1994
- Falkensee, wie es früher war, Kulturamt der Stadt Falkensee, 1. Auflage 1994
- Chronik, 1961
- Hans-Ulrich Rhinow, Heimatgeschichte Falkensee und Region
