= Kołata =

- Village
- Location within Poland
- Coordinates: 52°30′N 17°11′E
- Country: Poland
- Voivodeship: Greater Poland
- County: Poznań
- Gmina: Pobiedziska
- Elevation: 55 m (180 ft)

Kołata ([kɔˈwata]; German: Kolatta) is a village in the administrative district of Gmina Pobiedziska, within Poznań County, Greater Poland Voivodeship, in west-central Poland.
