= Krześlice =

- Village
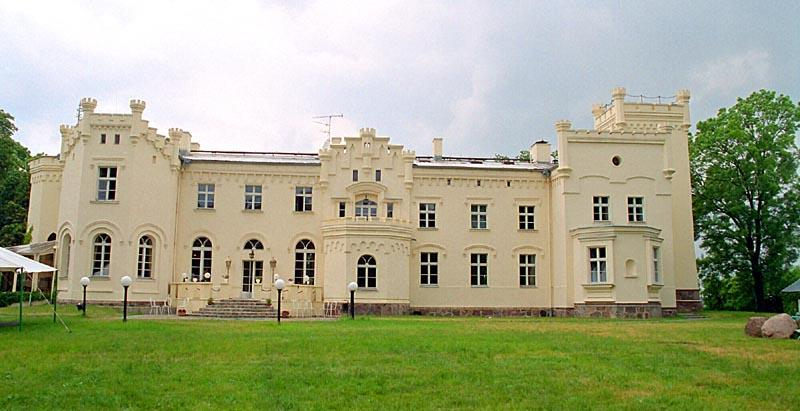
- Neogothic palace in Krześlice, built in 1860.

- Location within Poland
- Coordinates: 52°31′N 17°15′E
- Country: Poland
- Voivodeship: Greater Poland
- County: Poznań
- Gmina: Pobiedziska

Krześlice ([kʂɛˈɕlit͡sɛ]; German: Dreilinden) is a village in the administrative district of Gmina Pobiedziska, within Poznań County, Greater Poland Voivodeship, in west-central Poland.

The name of the village was first documented in 1396 in reference to a certain "Piotr of Crzyślice". During the sixteenth century the village was the property of the Przecławski family. In 1623 the village was the site of a banquet in honor of the son of the Polish king, Władysław (later king of Poland as well). By the eighteenth century the village was in decline but saw a revival in the nineteenth, when the "gothic revival" palace of the Radoński family was built, in 1860 (on the basis of an earlier estate. However, in 1888, the Prussian Settlement Commission (see Prussian Partition of Poland) dispossessed the owner of the palace, Zygmunt Radoński, and gave the palace to an ethnic German noble, Georg von Littiechau (Radoński was "compensated" with land in Congress Poland). After Poland regained its independence the palace was purchased by an industrialist from Łódź. During the German occupation of Poland, there was a nearby military airport. After World War II the palace was taken over by the communist authorities and fell to ruin, while the village itself became part of a state owned farm (PGR). After the fall of communism the palace was bought out by private investors and turned into a hotel and a restaurant.
