= UniversalGiving =

Non-profit organization in San Francisco

UniversalGiving is an American non-profit organization headquartered in San Francisco, California. The organization operates as a web-based marketplace mobilizing resources for international charities, and aims to promote global philanthropy.

UniversalGiving uses a venture capital approach to vetting all charities that appear on its site. UniversalGiving does not take any share on donations made through its website.

UniversalGiving was founded in 2002 by Pamela Hawley, one of the co-founders of VolunteerMatch.

In 2009, UniversalGiving received a Jefferson Award for Public Service, and in 2010 was a Finalist for Ernst and Young's Entrepreneur of the Year Award. 2010 also saw the launch of two partnerships in Community Based Journalism with Link TV and the Christian Science Monitor.
