= Berlin border crossings =

Post-WWII crossings in divided Berlin, Germany

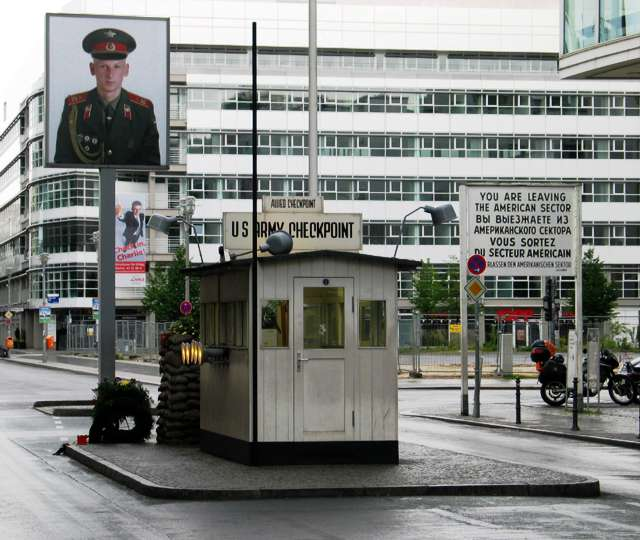
Checkpoint Charlie, Friedrichstraße, Berlin; Replica of the old western border post.

The Berlin border crossings were border crossings created as a result of the post-World War II division of Germany. Prior to the construction of the Berlin Wall in 1961, travel between the Eastern and Western sectors of Berlin was completely uncontrolled, although restrictions were increasingly introduced by the Soviet and East German authorities at major crossings between the sectors. This free access, especially after the closure of the Inner German border, allowed the Eastern Bloc emigration and defection to occur. East German officials, humiliated by this mass defection, subsequently chose to erect the Berlin Wall in order to prevent residents from leaving East Germany.

After the construction of the Berlin Wall in 1961, border stations between East Berlin (regarded as East Germany's capital by the German Democratic Republic but unrecognized by the Western Allies) and the sectors controlled by those three Western Allies were created. Although there were few crossings at first, more sites were built over the wall's lifespan. Many East Germans crossed the wall illegally by flying or climbing over it, sailing around it, or digging under it, while many others died while attempting to cross.

== Border control procedures ==
Between West Berlin and German Democratic Republic (GDR) territory, the border stations were developed very effectively on the GDR side. (The official designation for controlled border traffic was Grenzübergangsstelle, GÜSt: border crossing site.) Border officials and customs agents would monitor incoming and outgoing traffic according to established procedures, at times with the utmost scrutiny. A strict division of labor among the various organizations was the rule. The security of the outward-facing border and of the border crossings was maintained by special security divisions of the GDR border guard troops (German abbreviation SiK, short for Sicherungskompanien).

The actual inspections of vehicle and pedestrian traffic were carried out by the passport control units (German abbreviation PKE, short for Passkontrolleinheiten). The PKE units were not under the command of the GDR border guard troops and thereby the Ministry of Defense, but the Ministry for State Security (Division VI / Department 6, Passport Control). While on duty at the border stations, however, the PKE would wear the same uniforms as the border guard troops. For personal inspections, highly qualified and specially trained forces were used exclusively. The passports, identification cards, etc., could be transmitted from the inspection sites to a processing center using closed-circuit television and ultraviolet light, where they were recorded. From there, commands were issued using a numeric display to the passport control unit, for example "flip page", "request additional documentation", "delay processing", ask predefined questions, etc.

On the West Berlin side, police and customs agents were stationed. No personal inspections usually took place there.

- At the transit crossings (sites for traffic passing into the GDR en route to another country), statistical demographic data about travelers would be recorded (travel destination, etc.), and travelers would occasionally be inspected, when appropriate, for the purpose of criminal investigations (police "dragnets").
- Freight traffic bound for other countries was subject to customs processing. Shipping to the Federal Republic of Germany was only subject to statistical record-keeping and, under certain circumstances, sealing of the cargo.
- At Checkpoint Bravo (Dreilinden) and Checkpoint Charlie (Friedrichstraße), the Allied occupation forces had established checkpoints, but they were not relevant to regular personal and business traffic. They served as processing stations for military units as well as a display of military presence. Their designated authority to perform further inspections was utilized only in extremely rare cases.
- Signs directed travelers passing through the GDR to report any suspicious events that might have occurred during their transit; by these means, information was to be gathered regarding, for example, the arrest of West German citizens.

== Who could cross ==
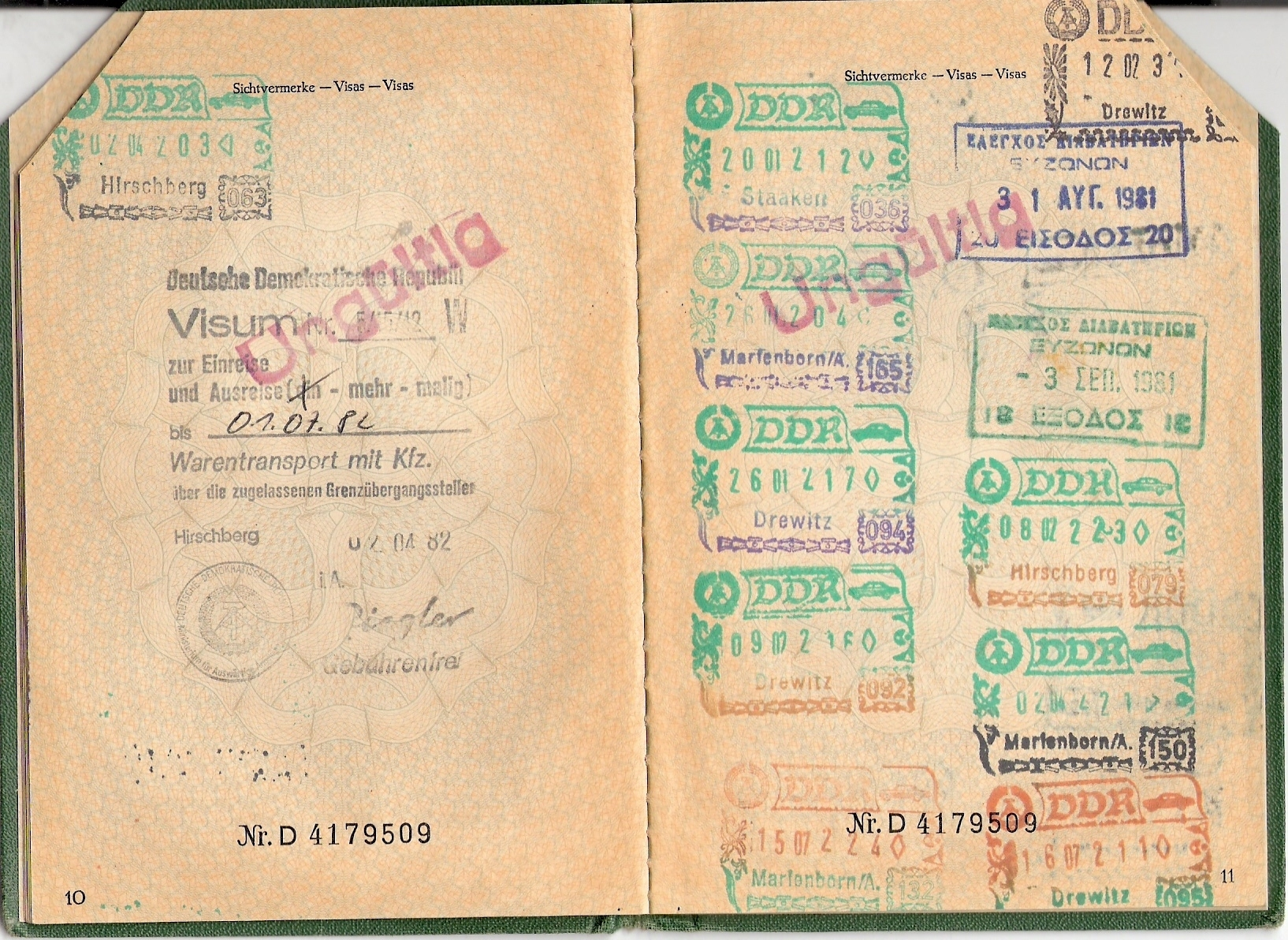
Visa for travel into East Germany with corresponding stamps at the Inner German border and West Berlin border

West Germans and citizens of other Western countries could in general visit East Germany. Usually this involved application of a visa at an East German embassy several weeks in advance. Visas for day trips restricted to East Berlin were issued without previous application in a simplified procedure at the border crossing. However, East German authorities could refuse entry permits without stating a reason. In the 1980s, visitors from the western part of the city who wanted to visit the eastern part had to exchange at least DM 25 into East German currency at the poor exchange rate of 1:1. It was forbidden to export East German currency out of the East, but money not spent could be left at the border for possible future visits. Tourists crossing from the west had to also pay for a visa, which cost DM 5; West Berliners did not have to pay this.

West Berliners initially could not visit East Berlin or East Germany at all. All crossing points were closed to them between 26 August 1961 and 17 December 1963. In 1963, negotiations between East and West resulted in a limited possibility for visits during the Christmas season that year (Passierscheinregelung). Similar very limited arrangements were made in 1964, 1965 and 1966. In 1971, with the Four Power Agreement on Berlin, agreements were reached that allowed West Berliners to apply for visas to enter East Berlin and East Germany regularly, comparable to the regulations already in force for West Germans. However, East German authorities could still refuse entry permits.

East Berliners and East Germans could at first not travel to West Berlin or West Germany at all. This regulation remained in force essentially until the fall of the wall, but over the years several exceptions to these rules were introduced, the most significant being:

- Old age pensioners could travel to the West starting in 1964
- Visits of relatives for important family matters
- People who had to travel to the West for professional reasons (e.g. artists, truck drivers etc.)

However, each visit had to be applied for individually and approval was never guaranteed. In addition, even if travel was approved, GDR travelers could exchange only a very small amount of East German Marks into Deutsche Marks (DM), thus limiting the financial resources available for them to travel to the West. This led to the West German practice of granting a small amount of DM annually (Begrüßungsgeld, or welcome money) to GDR citizens visiting West Germany and West Berlin, to help alleviate this situation.

Citizens of other East European countries except Yugoslavia were in general subject to the same prohibition on visiting Western countries as East Germans, though the applicable exception (if any) varied from country to country. Citizens of Hungary could freely cross into West Berlin from 1 January 1988.

== Border crossings until 1990 ==
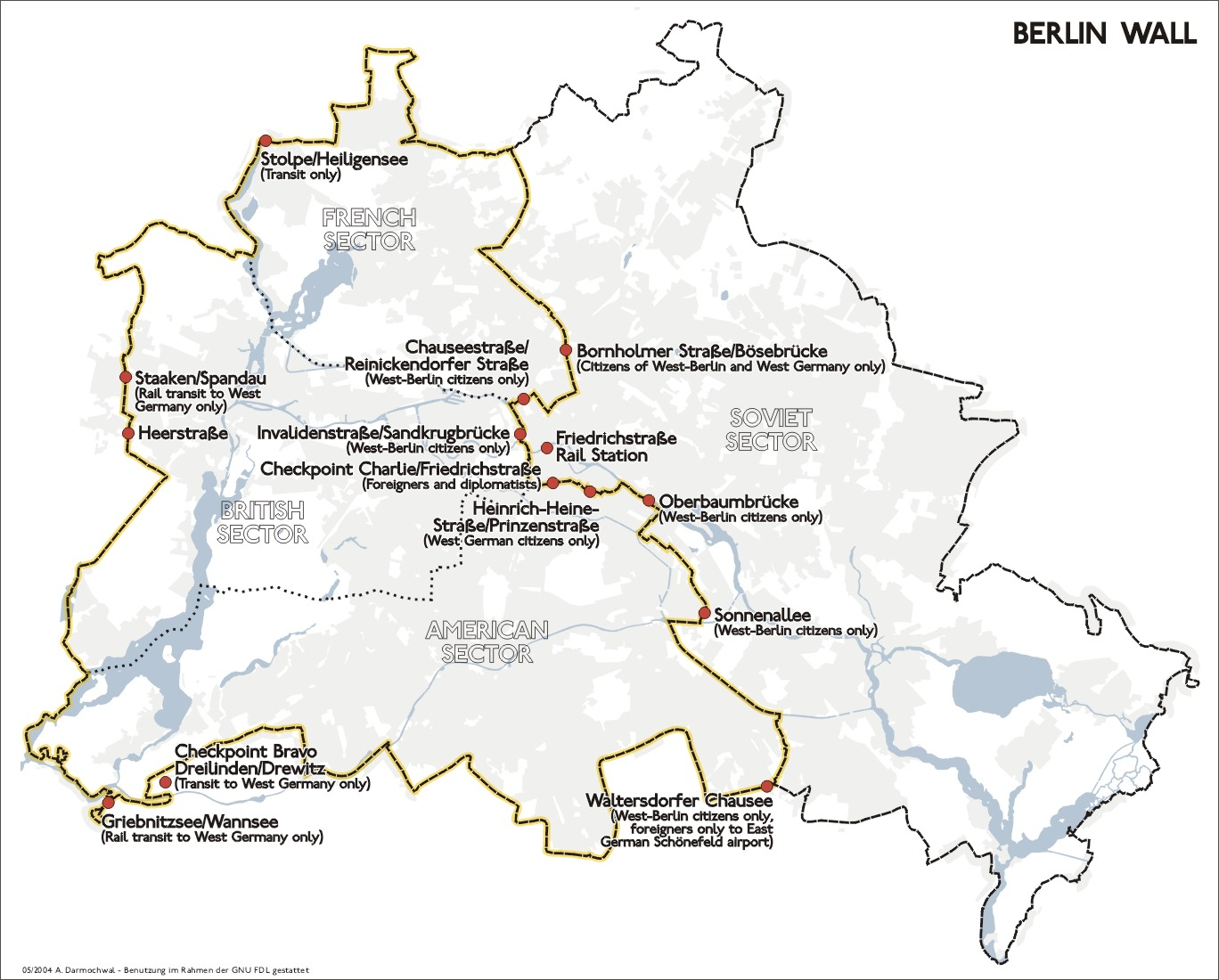
Map showing the Berlin border and its crossing points

On 13 August 1961, the crossings were at Kopenhagener Straße, Wollankstraße, Bornholmer Straße, Brunnenstraße, Chausseestraße, Brandenburger Tor, Friedrichstraße, Heinrich-Heine-Straße, Oberbaumbrücke, Puschkinallee, Elsenstraße, Sonnenallee, Rudower Straße. The Kopenhagener Straße, Wollankstraße, Brunnenstraße, Puschkinallee, Elsenstraße and Rudower Straße were closed on 23 August 1961, and in return, Invalidenstraße checkpoint was opened.

=== West Berlin – East Berlin ===
There were several border crossings between East and West Berlin:

- Bornholmer Straße border crossing, on Bornholmer Straße over the Bösebrücke between Berlin-Prenzlauer Berg and Berlin-Wedding (opened 1961).
  - For West Berliners, citizens of the Federal Republic, GDR citizens, and diplomats (by road)
- Brandenburg Gate between Berlin-Tiergarten and Berlin-Mitte, opened on 13 August 1961. On 14 August West Berliners gathered on the western side of the gate to demonstrate against the Berlin Wall, throwing stones, bricks and other debris at East German forces. Under the pretext that Western demonstrations required it, the East closed the checkpoint the same day, 'until further notice', a situation that was to last until 22 December 1989.
- Chausseestraße/Reinickendorfer Straße between Berlin-Wedding and Berlin-Mitte
  - For West Berliners and GDR citizens (by road)
- Invalidenstraße/Sandkrugbrücke between Tiergarten and Berlin-Mitte
  - For West Berliners and GDR citizens (by road)
- Checkpoint Charlie/Friedrichstraße between Berlin-Mitte and Berlin-Kreuzberg (opened 1961)
  - For foreigners, diplomats, Allied military personnel and GDR citizens (by road)
- Heinrich-Heine-Straße/Prinzenstraße between Berlin-Mitte and Berlin-Kreuzberg
  - For citizens of the Federal Republic, GDR citizens and diplomats (by road)
  - This was sometimes referred to as Checkpoint Delta
- Oberbaumbrücke between Friedrichshain and Berlin-Kreuzberg (opened 1963)
  - For West Berliners and GDR citizens (pedestrians)
- Sonnenallee between Neukölln and Treptow
  - For West Berliners and GDR citizens (by road)

In addition, entirely located in East Berlin (reached by streetcar, underground, or railroad):

- Friedrichstraße station (opened 1961)
  - For West Berliners, citizens of the Federal Republic, foreigners, diplomats, transit travelers and GDR citizens (rail/pedestrian) Railway crossings were surrounded by electric fences and minefields to prevent escapes.

=== West Berlin – East Germany ===
- Glienicke Bridge over the Havel from Berlin-Wannsee to Potsdam
  - Open to general traffic until 1952.
  - From 1952 on, open only for access by the western Allied Military Liaison Missions. Civilians with special permission were later allowed to cross the bridge on foot.
  - From 3 July 1953, the bridge was closed as one of the last routes connecting Berlin with the surrounding area for civilian traffic.
  - It became well known in particular because three exchanges of captured agents took place there between the American and Soviet superpowers.
- Lichtenrade/Mahlow (Federal Road 96), only for garbage trucks of the Berlin sanitation department and automobiles on service trips from West Berlin to the dump in Schöneiche.
- Waltersdorf Chaussee/Rudow Chaussee, besides its function for transit to and from the Berlin-Schönefeld airport, was also opened for passage of West Berliners into the GDR. The crossing was little known, as only its transit function was mentioned in guidebooks.
- In Kohlhasenbrück, for access to the Steinstücken exclave, and only for the use of its residents. This crossing was abolished after the 1971 territorial exchange, when East Germany ceded the interjacent tract of land to West Berlin.
- Bürgerablage Beach, for access to the exclaves Erlengrund and Fichtewiese, two allotment clubs, only for use by allotmenteers there. The crossing was abolished after the 1988 territorial exchange, when East Germany ceded two tracts of interjacent land to West Berlin.

==== Crossings for transit traffic ====
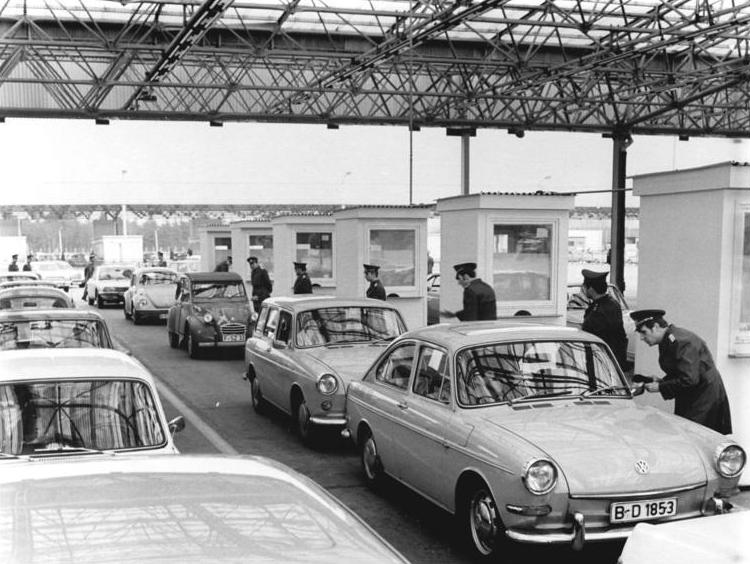
East German guards checking cars at the Checkpoint Drewitz, the GDR side of Checkpoint Dreilinden/Checkpoint Bravo in 1972

===== Road crossings =====
These crossings could be used for passage on the prescribed transit highways and for travel within the SOZ/GDR:

- Dreilinden (Allied Checkpoint Bravo)/Drewitz: The Autobahn Crossing Checkpoint Dreilinden and Border Crossing Station (GÜSt) Drewitz was for travel and freight traffic. Even after this portion of the autobahn was rebuilt and the crossing station was relocated on 15 October 1969, the names were retained. Berlin-Zehlendorf/Kleinmachnow would have been more correct.
  - to the Federal Republic, in the following directions:
    - Marienborn / Helmstedt (Lower Saxony, Hannover; Allied Checkpoint Alpha)
    - Hirschberg / Rudolphstein (Bavaria, Hof, Nürnberg, München)
    - Wartha / Herleshausen (toward Hesse, Frankfurt am Main)
  - into Czechoslovakia:
    - Zinnwald / Cinovec
  - to Poland:
    - Pomellen / Kołbaskowo (Kolbitzow) (in the direction of Szczecin, Gdańsk)
    - Frankfurt (Oder) / Slubice (toward central Poland, Warsaw)
    - Forst (toward southern Poland, (in the direction of Wrocław, Katowice, Kraków)
  - toward Scandinavia:
    - Sassnitz by Baltic sea passage to Sweden (Trelleborg), Denmark (Rønne)
    - Rostock / Warnemünde by Baltic sea passage to Denmark (Gedser), passengers and crews of passenger ships.
  - In addition the only trans-border bus line of the BVG, bus line 99, passed through this crossing from the Wannsee streetcar station to Potsdam-Babelsberg (autobahn exit) and back. Until 9 November 1989 only buses without an upper deck or advertising were allowed; afterwards, conventional double-decker buses with advertising would pass as well, due to increased traffic and the freedom of passage after the Berlin Wall fell.
- Heerstraße in Berlin-Staaken / Staaken-West (1951 – 1982, previously in Dallgow):
  - Horst / Lauenburg (B 5 / F 5: to northern Germany, Hamburg)
    - This crossing offered the only option for driving to the Federal Republic with vehicles not permitted on the autobahn (e.g., bicycles, mopeds, tractors, and other specialized vehicles), on condition that one make the trip without interruption (overnight stays, lengthy breaks).
    - This crossing was later closed and replaced by an autobahn connection through Tegel. With this change, the possibility of going through the GDR with other vehicles ended.
- Berlin-Heiligensee/Stolpe: Autobahn Crossing Checkpoint Berlin-Heiligensee and Stolpe in Hohen Neuendorf
  - to the Federal Republic, in the direction of:
    - Zarrentin / Gudow (northern Germany, Hamburg)
  - to Poland
    - Pomellen / Kołbaskowo (Kolbitzow) (toward Szczecin, Gdańsk)
  - to Scandinavia
    - Sassnitz by Baltic sea passage to Sweden (Trelleborg), Denmark (Rønne)
    - Rostock / Warnemünde by Baltic sea passage to Denmark (Gedser), passengers and crews of passenger ships.
- Lichtenrade / Großbeeren: This crossing planned but never realised. Intended to be developed as an autobahn border control station for transit travelers.

===== Rail crossings =====
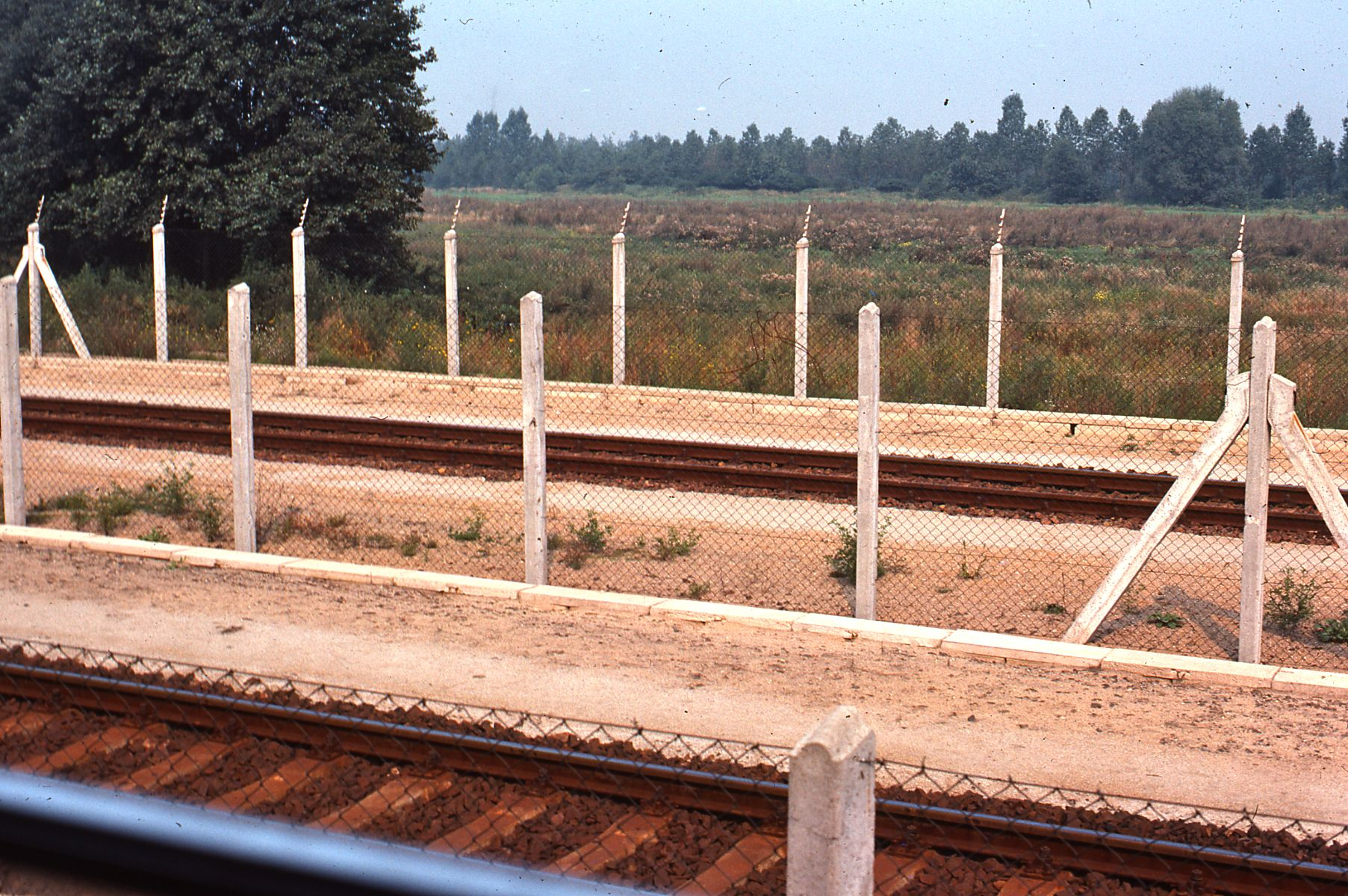
West German trains ran through East Germany. This 1977 view shows how barriers were made near the tracks to keep people away. The fence depicted carried an electric charge of over 20,000 volts. Landmines were also planted outside these fences.

- Berlin-Wannsee/Griebnitzsee (for passenger traffic) and Steinstücken/Drewitz Station (for freight traffic)
  - Marienborn/Helmstedt (Hannover, western Germany)
  - Schwanheide/Büchen (Hamburg, northern Germany, 1961 – 1976)
  - Gerstungen/Bebra (western Germany, Hesse, Frankfurt am Main)
  - Probstzella/Ludwigsstadt (southern Germany, Hof, Nürnberg, München)
- Berlin-Spandau/Staaken (SOZ / 'GDR') (restricted to freight only from 1961 to 1976; during those years, passenger traffic was diverted via Berlin-Wannsee/Griebnitzsee)
  - Schwanheide/Büchen (Hamburg, northern Germany)
- Zoologischer Garten Station/Friedrichstraße Station
  - ČSSR, Poland, Scandinavia
    - Furthermore, many train connections ended at the Ostbahnhof (east station). Very few passenger coaches passed through (e.g. Paris – Moscow), and in general one had to change trains at the Ostbahnhof (then the Berlin main station) or in the Berlin-Lichtenberg station.

===== Waterways =====
The numerous border crossings on waterways (e.g., Spree, Havel, Teltow Canal) were only open to commercial freight traffic. Recreational boats had to be loaded onto ships or towed overland.

- Tiefer See / Glienicke Lake (1954–1961) This crossing was not relevant for traffic to and from West Berlin.
- Dreilinden / Kleinmachnow, Teltow Canal (from 1981 on)
- Teufelssee Canal / Hennigsdorf (only traffic to and from GDR destinations and transit traffic (Poland), not to the Federal Republic)
- Potsdam-Nedlitz / Jungfernsee
- Crossings within the Berlin city limits

==== Air travel ====
To and from Berlin-Schönefeld Airport for air travel:

- Waltersdorfer Chaussee/Rudower Chaussee (transfer bus to and from West Berlin)

also, within East Berlin territory (access via streetcar, U-bahn or rail):

- Friedrichstraße Station (starting in 1961)

At the Berlin-Tempelhof and Berlin-Tegel airports there were border crossings staffed by West Berlin police and customs. These were not located in territory controlled by the GDR. In addition to processing for international air travel, the personal documents of travelers between West Berlin and the Federal Republic were inspected.

=== Miscellaneous crossings ===
The various illegal or unofficial border crossings are not reliably documented:

- those constructed between the East and West by refugees and those who assisted them, mostly underground. Many of these were discovered and destroyed.
- those constructed by, e.g., the Ministry for State Security and other clandestine organizations, in order to transfer people unobserved between East and West.

== Changes in 1989 and 1990 ==
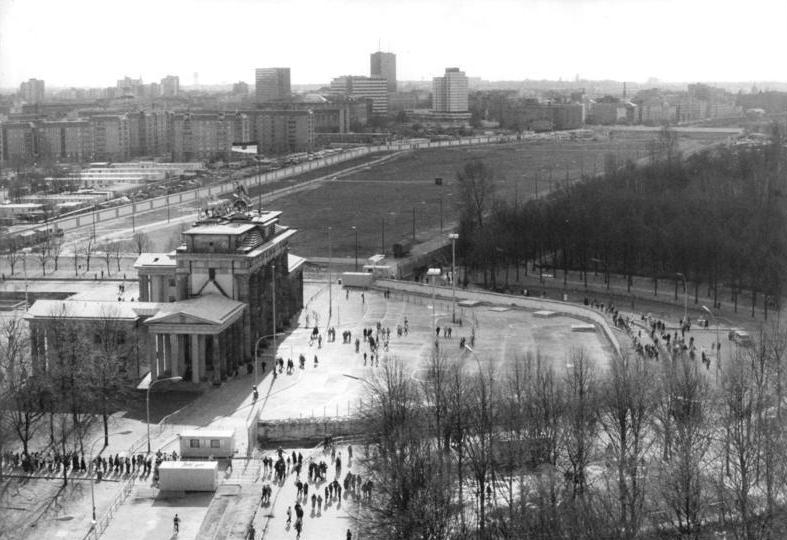
The Brandenburg Gate with its two crossing checkpoints. The southern checkpoint (background in picture) is for those entering East Berlin while those exiting East Berlin go through the northern checkpoint (foreground in picture). Note the number of people gathered at the southern checkpoint to enter East Berlin.

In the time between the fall of the Berlin Wall on 9 November 1989 and the abolition of all border controls on 1 July 1990, numerous additional border crossings were built for interim use. Because of their symbolic value, the most famous of these were Glienicke Bridge, Bernauer Straße, Potsdamer Platz, and the Brandenburg Gate.

The opening of the Brandenburg Gate was merely a public relations formality which took place on 22 December 1989 at the request of then-Chancellor Helmut Kohl. Hundreds of television crews from all over the world had anticipated this historic event for weeks.

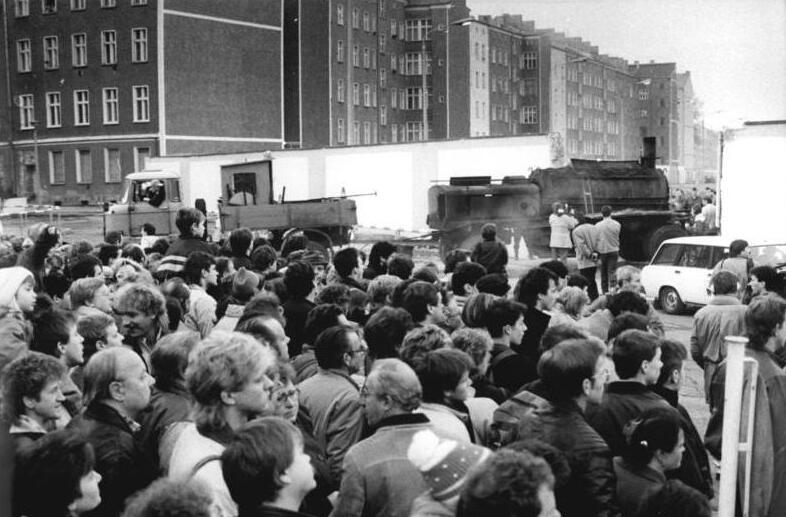
Eberswalder Straße crossing being created on 11 November 1989, two days after the fall of the Berlin Wall

West Germans and West Berliners were allowed visa-free travel to East Berlin and East Germany starting 23 December 1989. Until then, they could only visit under restrictive conditions that involved application for a visa several days or weeks in advance and obligatory exchange of at least 25 DM per day of their planned stay. Thus, in the weeks between 9 November 1989 and 23 December 1989, East Germans could travel more freely than Westerners as they were able to cross into West Berlin with just passport checks.

There are also roads that are reopened between 12 June 1990 and 21 June 1990 with or without border controls.

The controls were abandoned on 1 July 1990, the day of the currency union and before the actual reunification of Germany on 3 October 1990. In the months after the fall of the Wall, border crossings between the East and the West had become more and more irrelevant.

Today, a few portions of the structures have been retained as a memorial.

A chronological list of Berlin border crossings opened until 30 June 1990
No	Date	Time	Location	Areas linked	Notes
1	10 November 1989	08:00	Kirchhainer Damm	Mahlow/Berlin-Lichtenrade (F 96/B 96)	Already in use for sanitation trucks, was opened to private citizens
2	10 November 1989	18:00	Glienicke Bridge	Potsdam/Berlin-Wannsee	Already in use for Allied personnel, was opened to private citizens
3	11 November 1989	08:00	Eberswalder Straße/Bernauer Straße	Prenzlauer Berg/Berlin-Wedding	
4	11 November 1989	08:00	Jannowitzbrücke subway station	Berlin-Mitte/Subway line U8	Previously a ghost station
5	11 November 1989	13:00	Puschkinallee/Schlesische Straße	Treptow/Berlin-Kreuzberg	
6	12 November 1989	08:00	Potsdamer Platz	Berlin-Mitte/Tiergarten	
7	13 November 1989	08:00	Wollankstraße	Pankow/Berlin-Wedding	
8	13 November 1989	18:00	Falkenseer Chaussee	Falkensee/Berlin-Spandau	
9	14 November 1989	08:00	Philipp-Müller-Allee /Ostpreußendamm	Teltow/Berlin-Lichterfelde	
10	14 November 1989	08:00	Stubenrauchstraße – Massantebrücke	Berlin-Johannisthal/Berlin-Rudow	
11	11 December 1989		Karl-Marx-Straße/Benschallee	Kleinmachnow/Berlin-Nikolassee-Düppel	
12	22 December 1989		Rosenthaler Platz subway station	Berlin-Mitte/Subway line U8	Previously a ghost station
13	22 December 1989		Brandenburg Gate	Berlin-Mitte/Tiergarten	
14	3 January 1990		Karl-Marx-Straße/Buckower Damm	Groß Ziethen/Berlin-Buckow	
15	13 January 1990		Ruppiner Chaussee	Hennigsdorf-Stolpe Süd/Berlin-Heiligensee-Schulzendorf	
16	22 January 1990		Griebnitzsee station		Was already in use as a transit crossing, then was opened for the newly inaugurated commuter train Potsdam-Wannsee
17	30 January 1990		Potsdamer Chaussee	Groß-Glienicke/Berlin-Kladow-Groß Glienicke	
18	17 February 1990		Berliner Straße/Oranienburger Chaussee (F 96/B 96)	Hohen-Neuendorf/Frohnau	
19	3 March 1990		Oranienburger Chaussee/Berliner Straße (through "Entenschnabel" F 96/B 96)	Glienicke-Nordbahn/Hermsdorf (Berlin)	
20	17 March 1990		Rudolf-Breitscheid-Straße/Neue Kreisstraße	Potsdam-Babelsberg/Berlin-Wannsee-Kohlhasenbrück	
21	17 March 1990		Böttcherberg	Potsdam-Klein-Glienicke/Berlin-Wannsee	
22	23 March 1990		Lindenstraße	Berlin-Mitte/Berlin-Kreuzberg	
23	31 March 1990		Zehlendorfer Damm/Machnower Straße	Kleinmachnow/Berlin-Zehlendorf	
24	6 April 1990		Lichtenrader Straße/Groß Ziethener Straße	Groß Ziethen/Berlin-Lichtenrade	
25	6 April 1990		Arcostraße/Beethovenstraße	Mahlow/Berlin-Lichtenrade	
26	7 April 1990		Brunnenstraße	Berlin-Mitte/Berlin-Wedding	
27	7 April 1990		Kopenhagener Straße	Berlin-Niederschönhausen-Wilhelmsruh/Berlin-Reinickendorf	
28	12 April 1990		Schilling Bridge/Köpenicker Straße	Berlin-Mitte/Berlin-Kreuzberg	
29	12 April 1990		Elsenstraße	Treptow/Berlin-Neukölln	
30	12 April 1990		Bernauer Straße subway station	Berlin-Mitte/Berlin-Wedding	Previously a ghost station, it was opened without border controls, with direct access to West Berlin
31	12 April 1990		Rudower Chaussee/Groß-Ziethener Chaussee	Groß Ziethen/Berlin-Rudow	
32	27 May 1990		Torweg	Staaken-West/Berlin-Staaken	
33	8 June 1990		Dammweg	Berlin-Baumschulenweg/Berlin-Neukölln	
34	11 June 1990		Behmstraßen Bridge	Prenzlauer Berg/Berlin-Wedding	
35	17 June 1990		Wilhelmsruher Damm	Berlin-Rosenthal/Berlin-Wittenau-Märkisches Viertel	
36	23 June 1990		Berliner Allee/Schönwalder Allee	Schönwalde/Berlin-Spandau	
37	23 June 1990		Knesebeck Bridge	Teltow/Berlin-Zehlendorf-Schönow	
38	30 June 1990		Großbeeren-Heinersdorf/Marienfelder Allee (F 100/B 101)	Berlin-Marienfelde	

== Remaining border controls ==
Due to German reunification, the Cold War-specific border control procedures between West Berlin and East Germany have disappeared altogether.

The last border control facilities in Berlin's city limits were those of Tegel International Airport, which were staffed by German Federal Police and Customs for normal international traffic screening purposes; these were closed in 2020 following the opening of the Berlin Brandenburg International Airport, which is situated south of the city in Schönefeld, Brandenburg.

== Gallery ==
=== Berlin border crossings ===
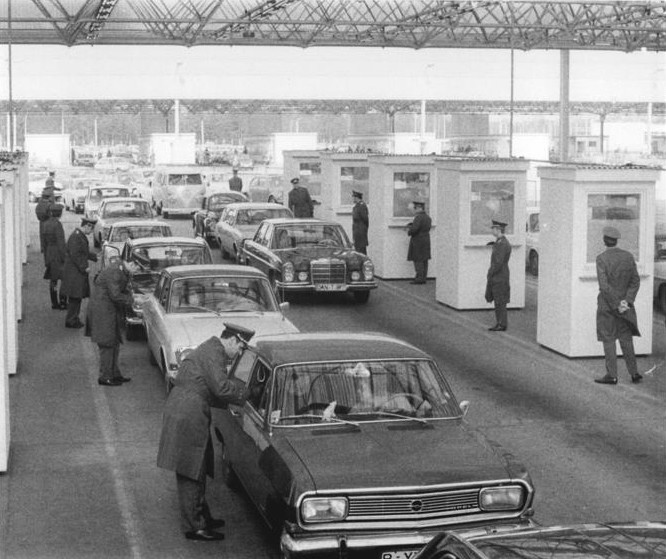
East German guards at the Drewitz-Dreilinden crossing

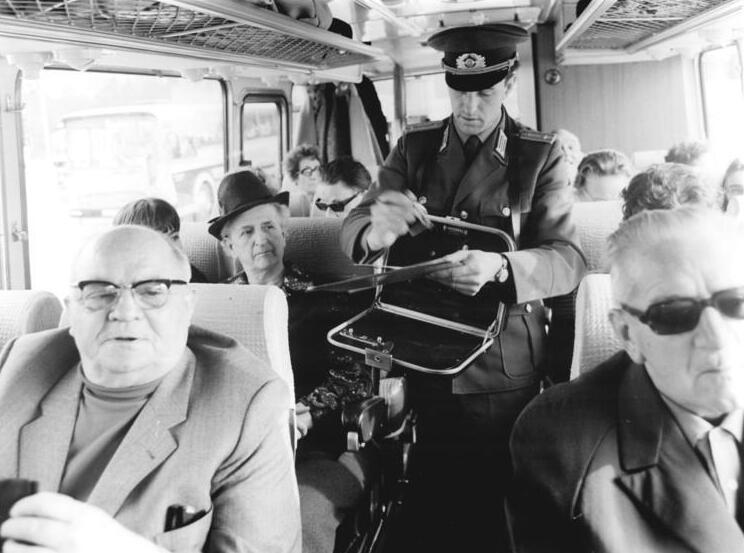
Passport control on the bus at the Drewitz-Dreilinden crossing

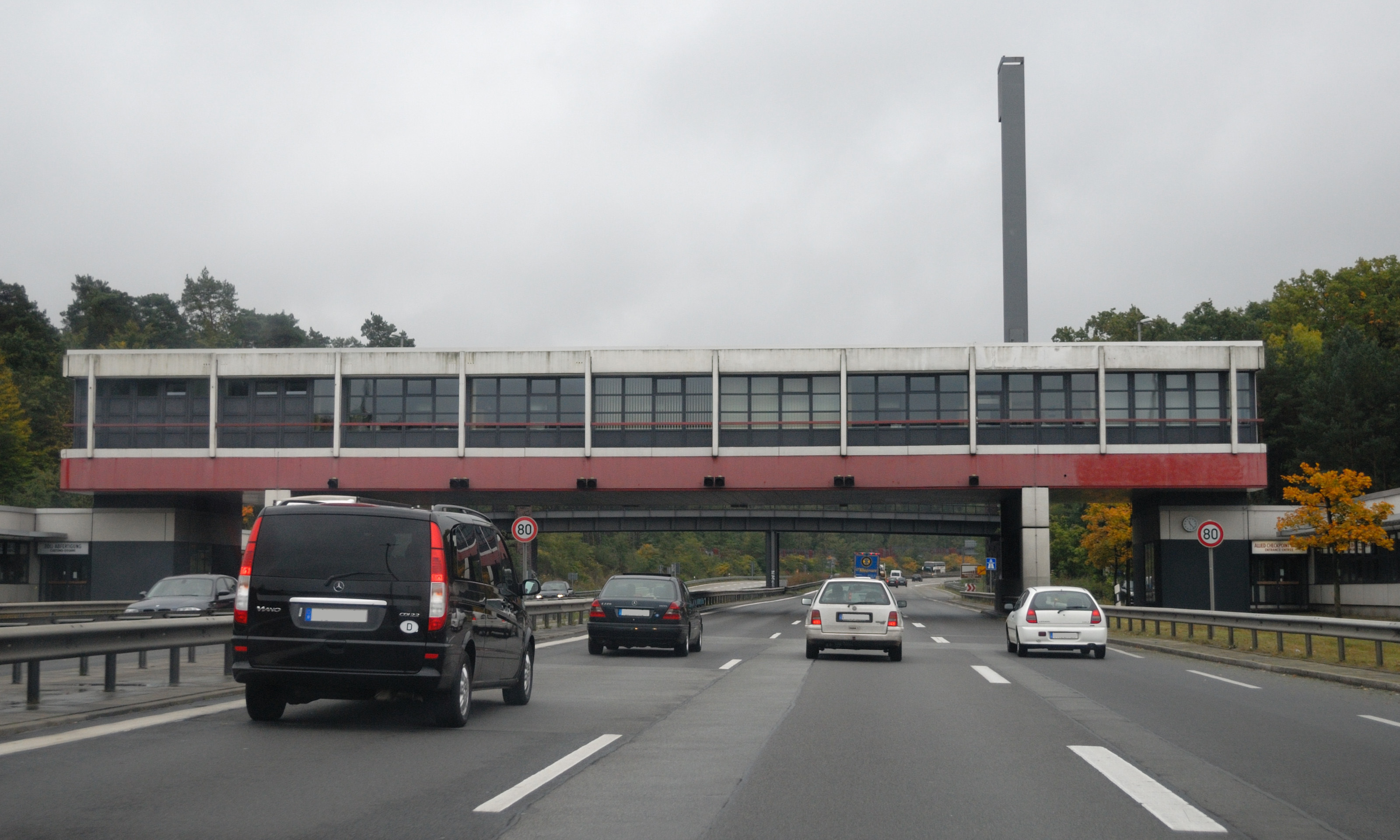
What is left of Checkpoint Bravo today

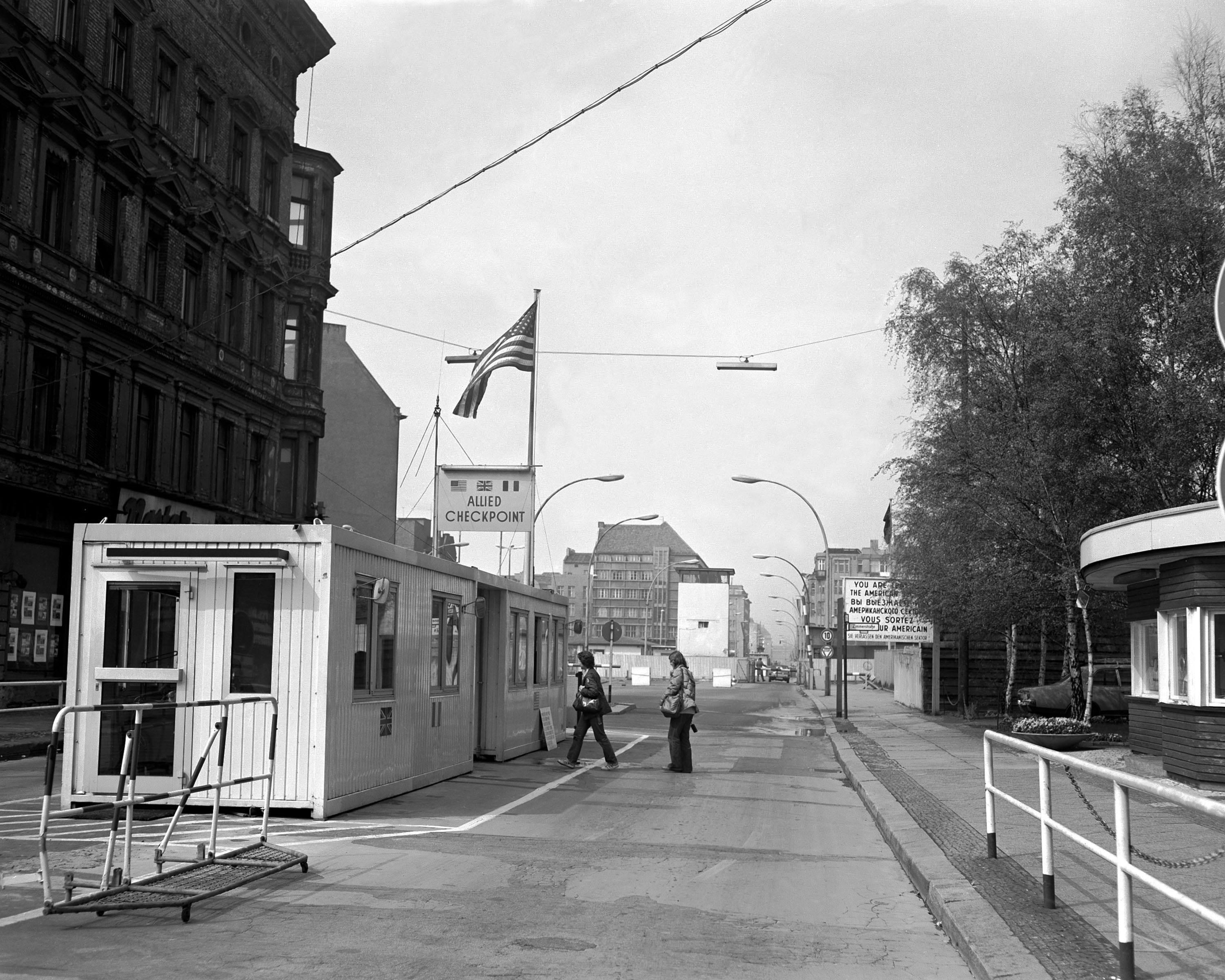
Checkpoint Charlie in 1977

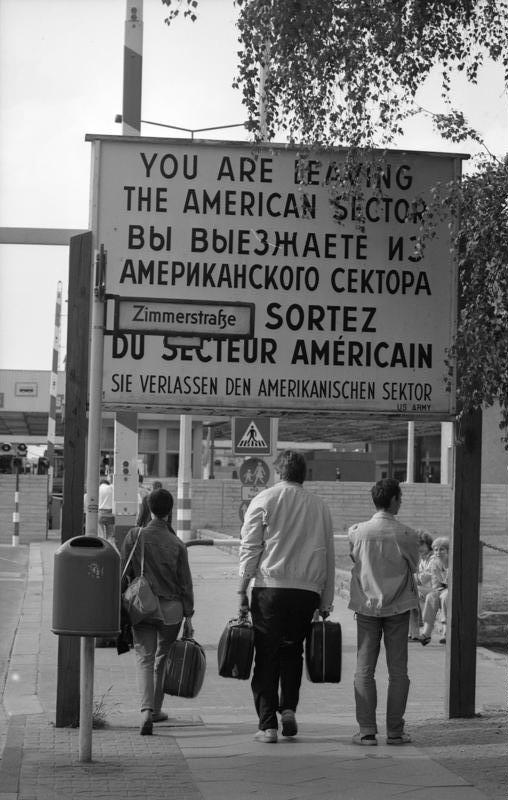
Crossing Checkpoint Charlie in 1988

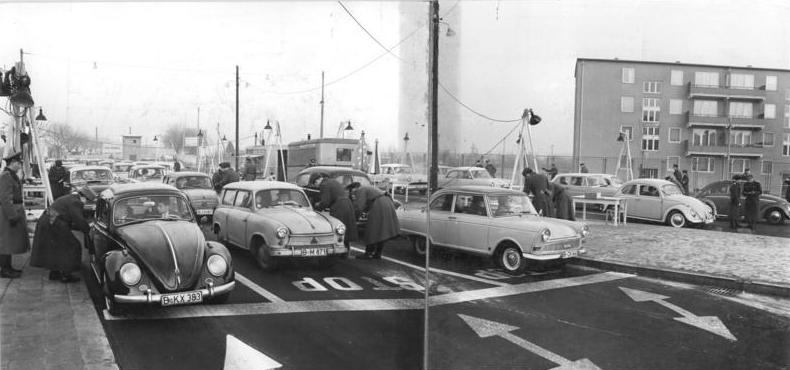
Sonnenallee crossing

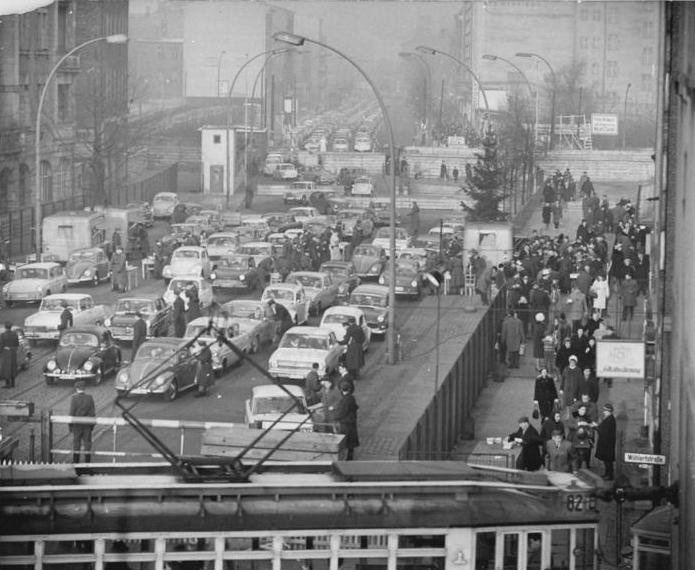
Chausseestraße crossing in 1964

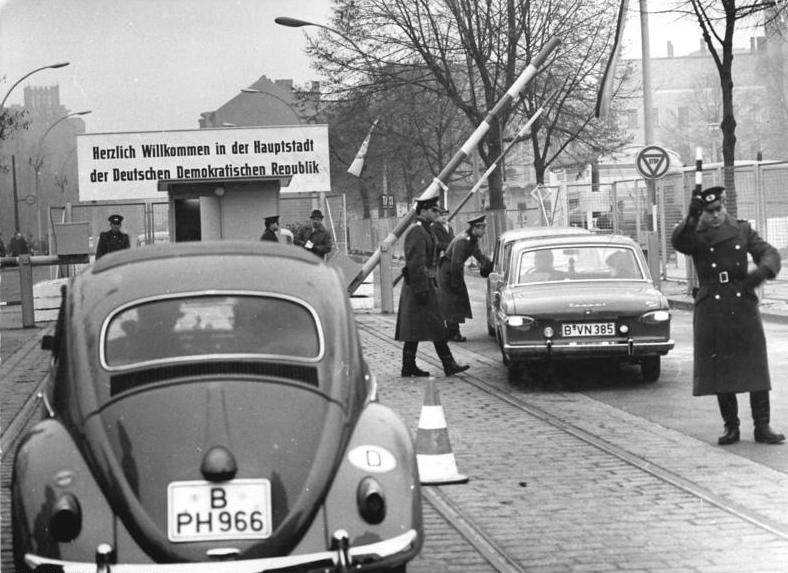
Invalidenstraße crossing in 1964

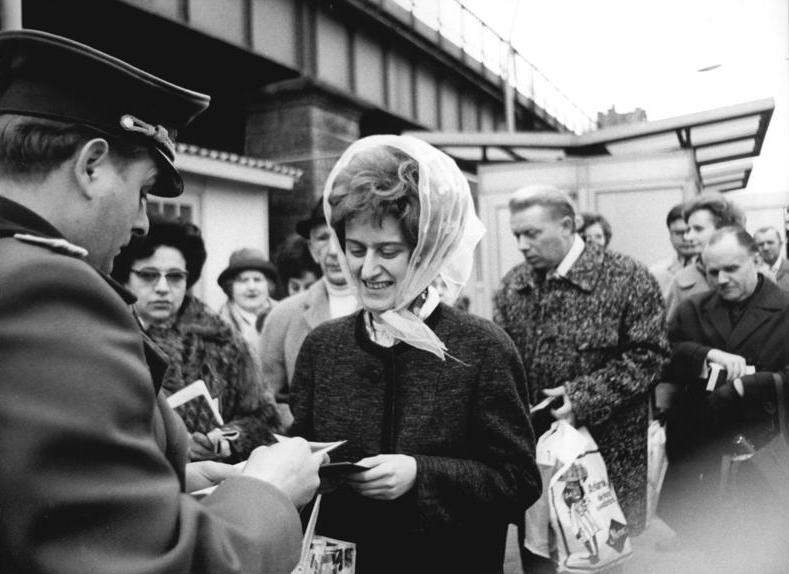
Passport checks at the Oberbaumbrücke crossing in 1972

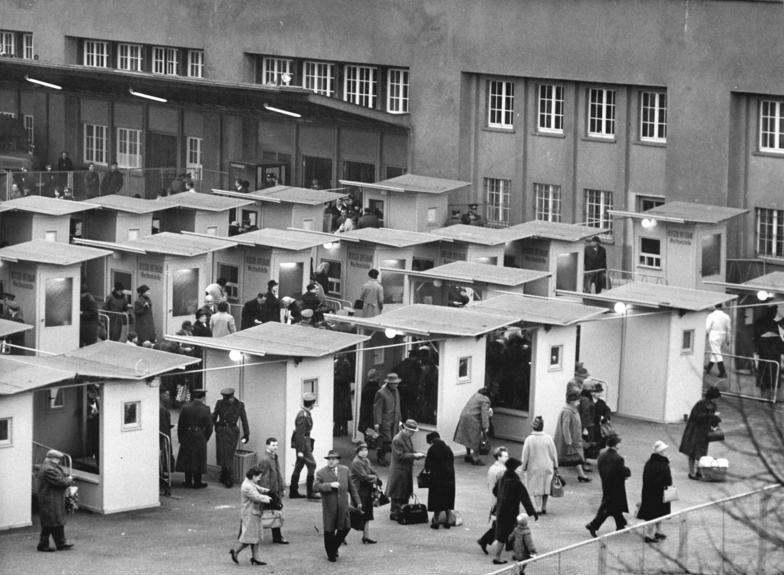
Checkpoint booths outside the Friedrichstraße railway station, which, although located completely in East Berlin, was a major crossing as it was served by trains from West Berlin.

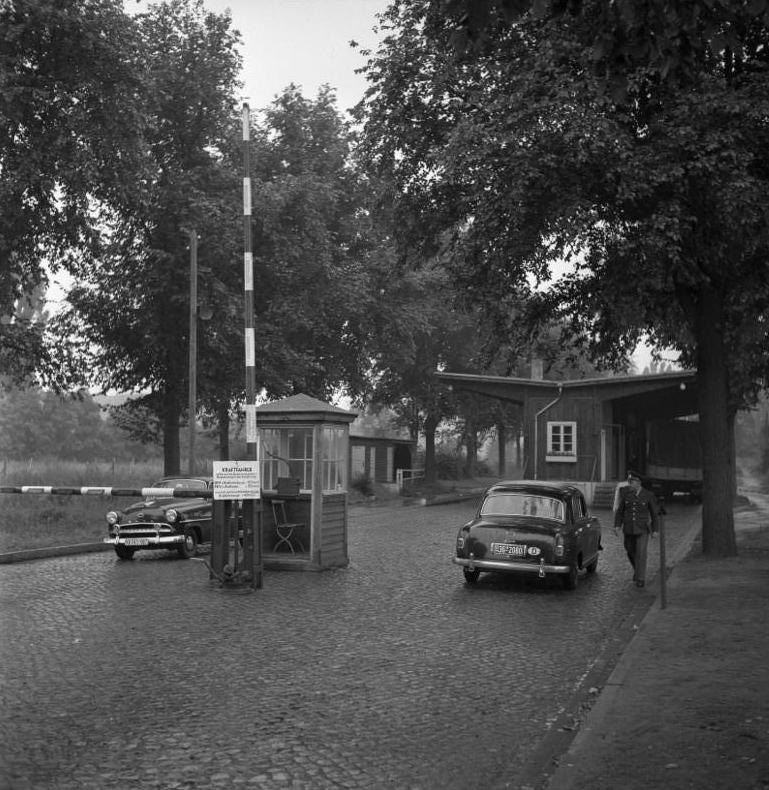
Border crossing Heerstraße in 1955

=== Crossings after the fall of the Berlin Wall ===
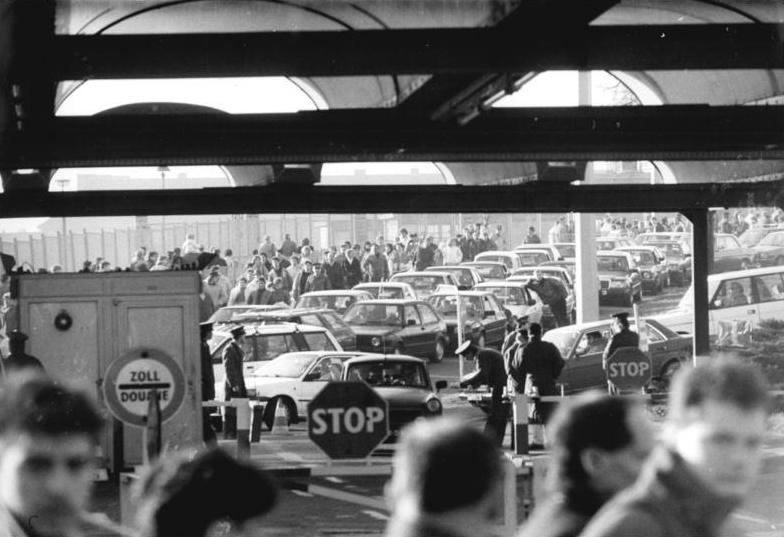
Crowds of East Germans stream towards the Bornholmer Straße crossing on 10 November 1989, a day after the fall of the Berlin Wall.

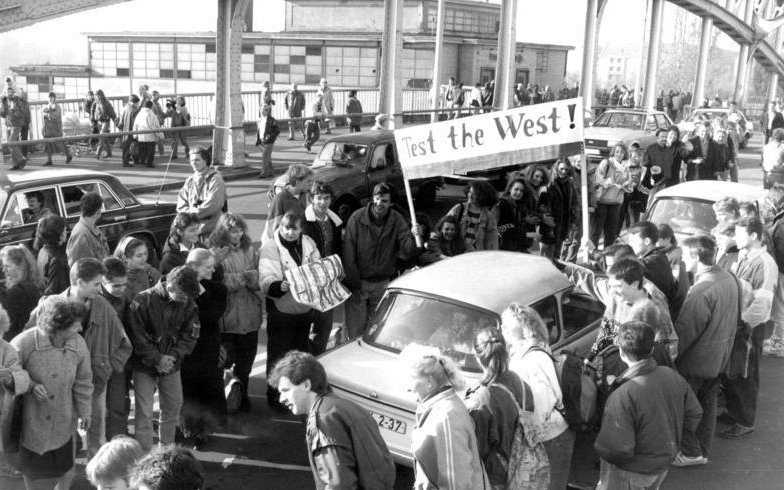
Walking across the Böse-Brücke at the Bornholmer Straße crossing

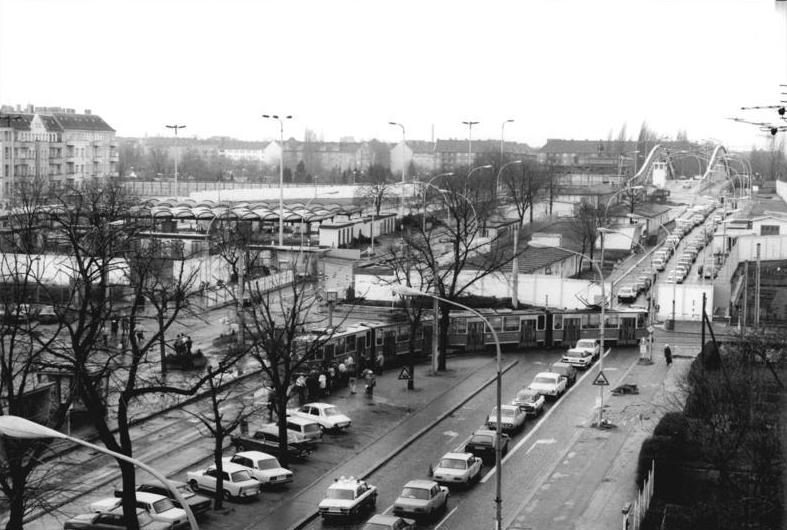
Queues of cars at the Bornholmer Straße crossing

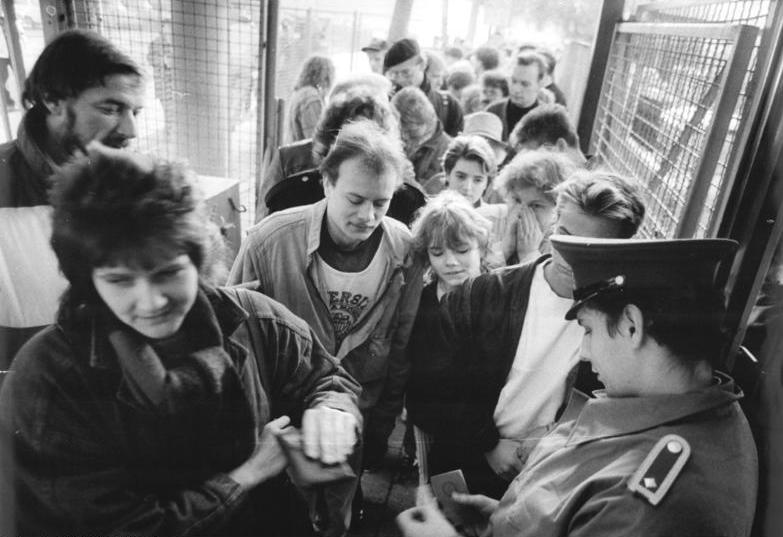
Crowds at the Chausseestraße crossing on 10 November 1989

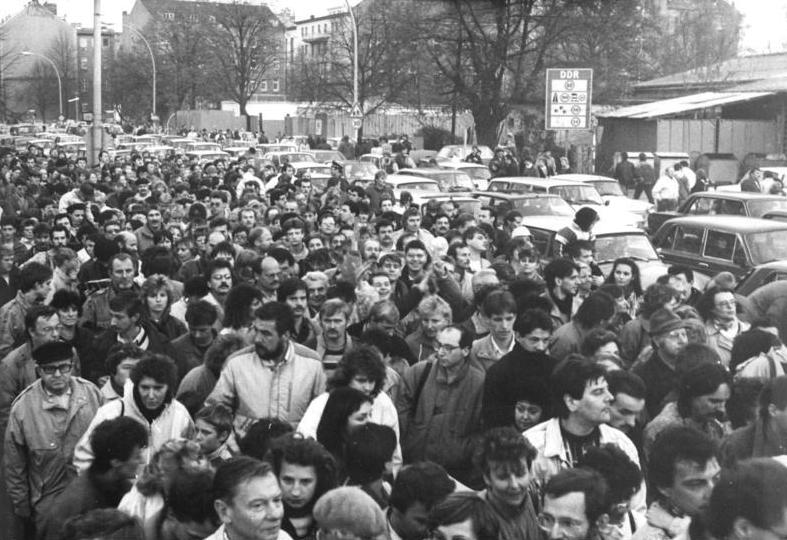
At the Invalidenstraße crossing on 10 November 1989

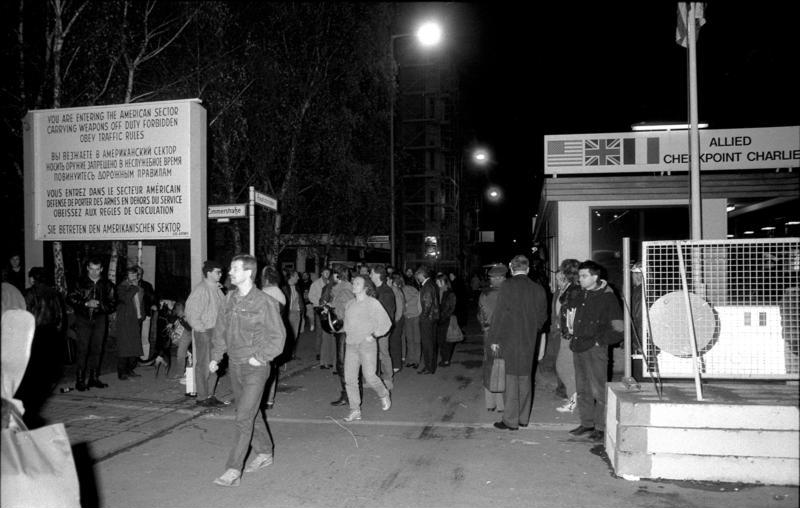
At Checkpoint Charlie on 10 November 1989

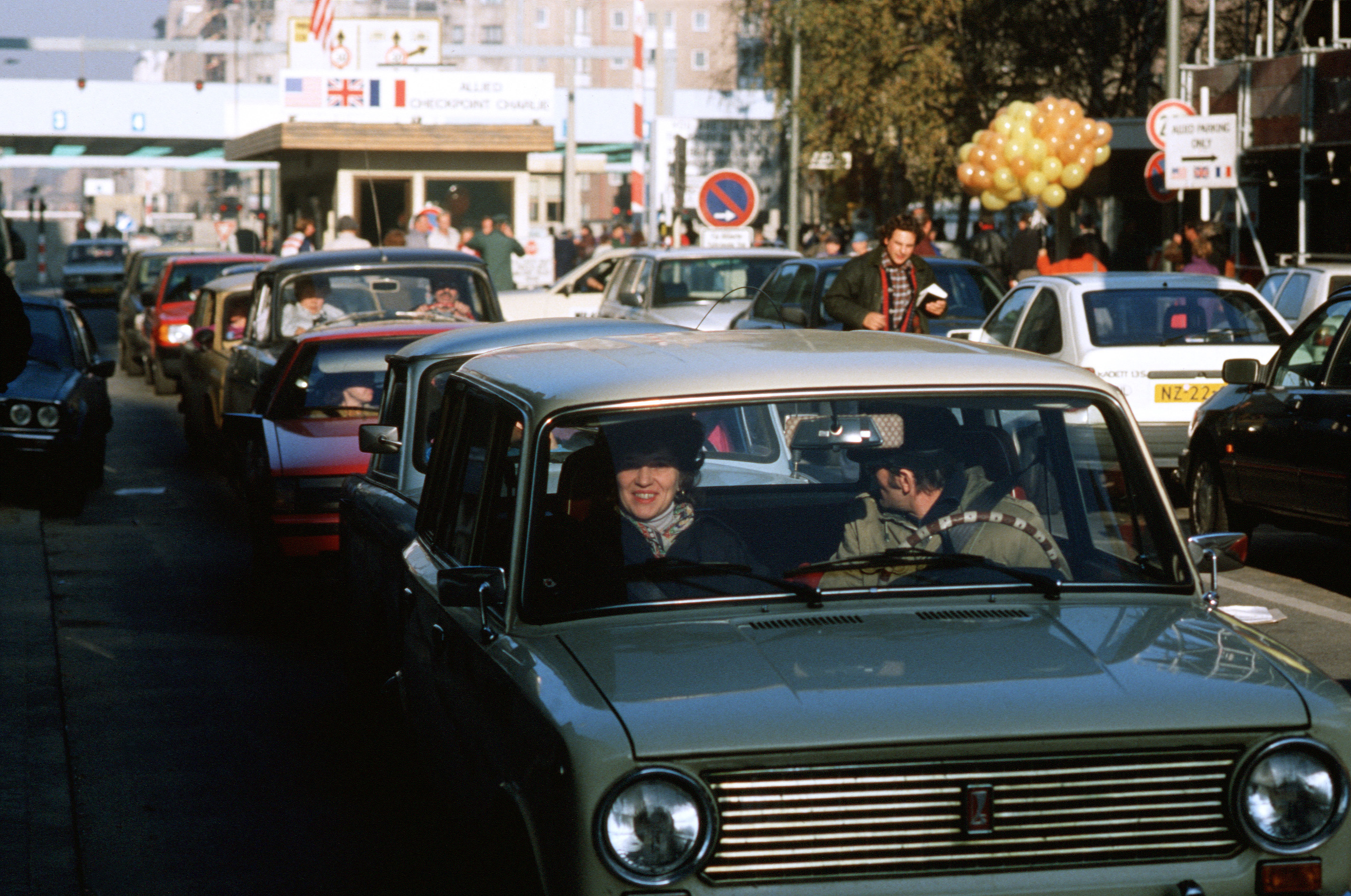
East Germans drive their vehicles through Checkpoint Charlie as they take advantage of relaxed travel restrictions to visit West Germany. The car is Lada 2102.

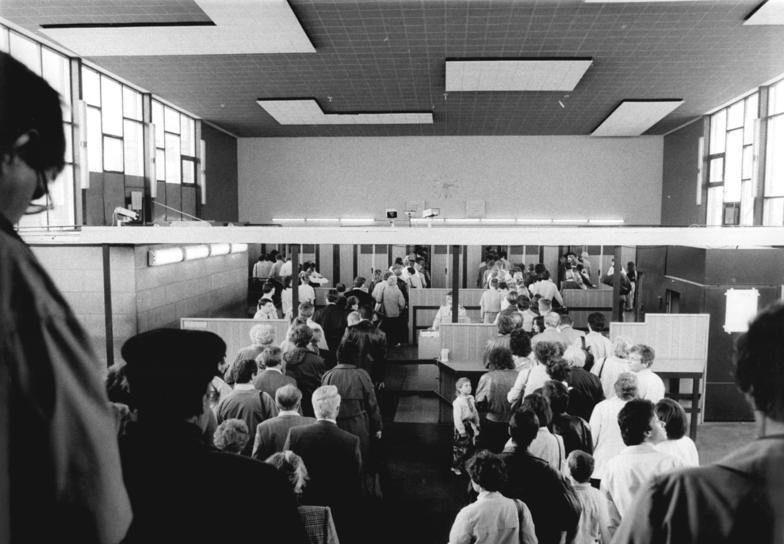
Queues at the Friedrichstraße railway station after the fall of the Wall

=== Newly opened crossings after the fall of the Wall ===
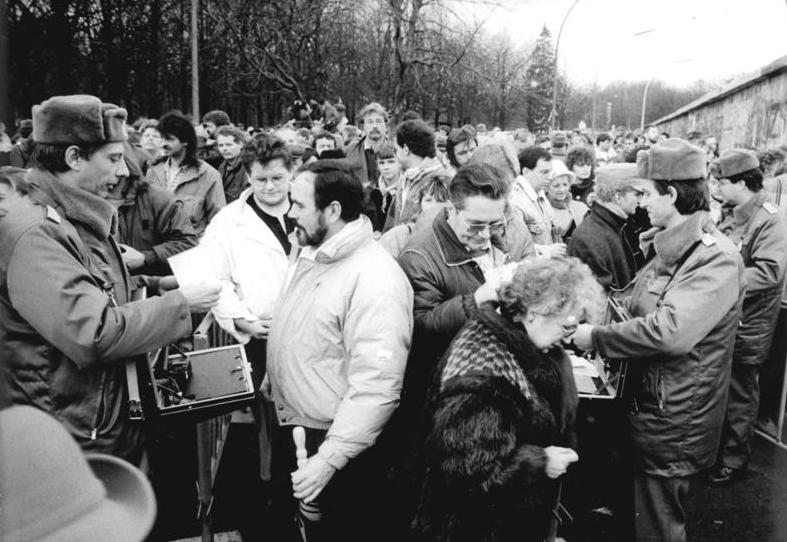
Border control at the newly opened Brandenberger Tor crossing on 23 December 1989

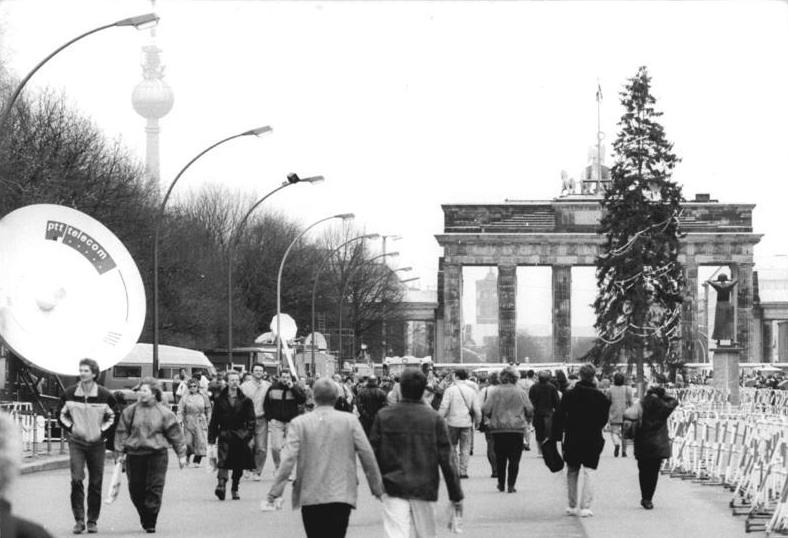
Crowds heading to the Brandenberger Tor crossing

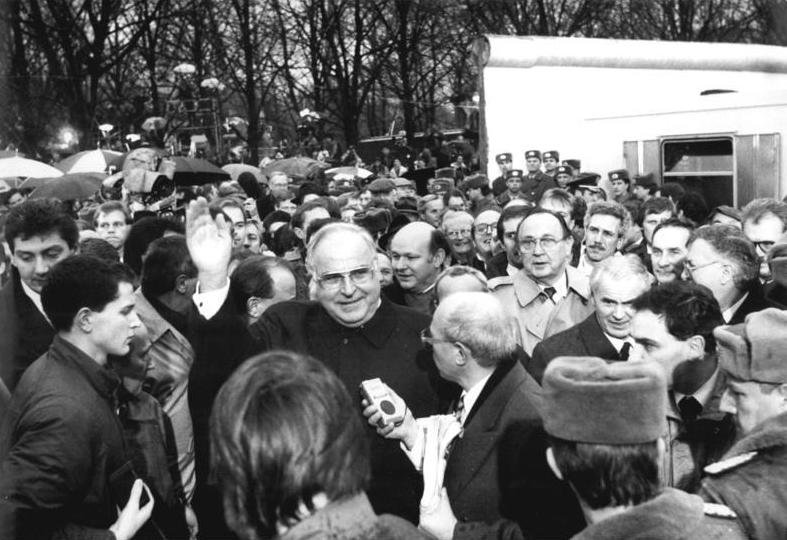
West German Chancellor Dr. Helmut Kohl, West Berlin mayor Walter Momper, West German Foreign Minister Hans-Dietrich Genscher and East German Prime Minister Dr. Hans Modrow at the opening of the Brandenburger Tor crossing on 22 December 1989

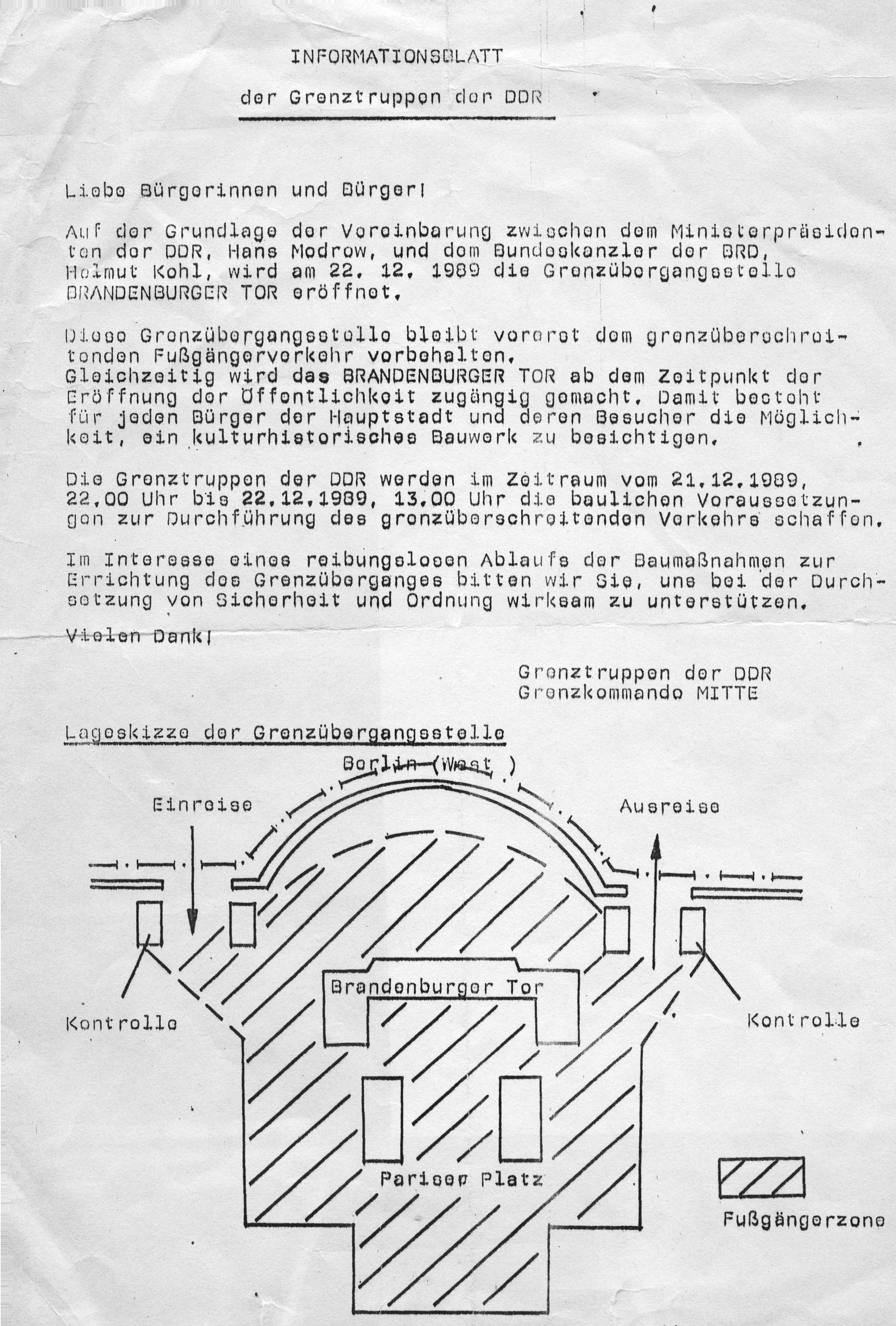
Handout announcing the opening of the Brandenburg Gate crossing

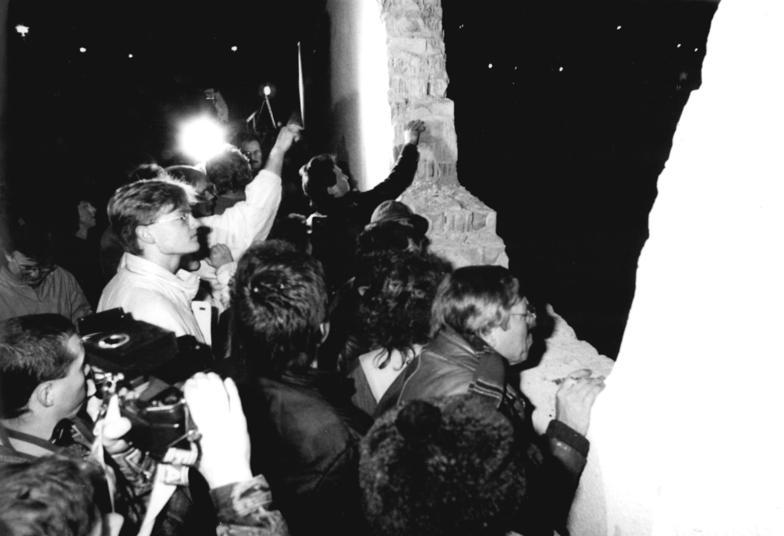
The Eberswalder Straße being created on the night of 10 November 1989, a day after the fall of the Berlin Wall. The crossing was opened the following day.

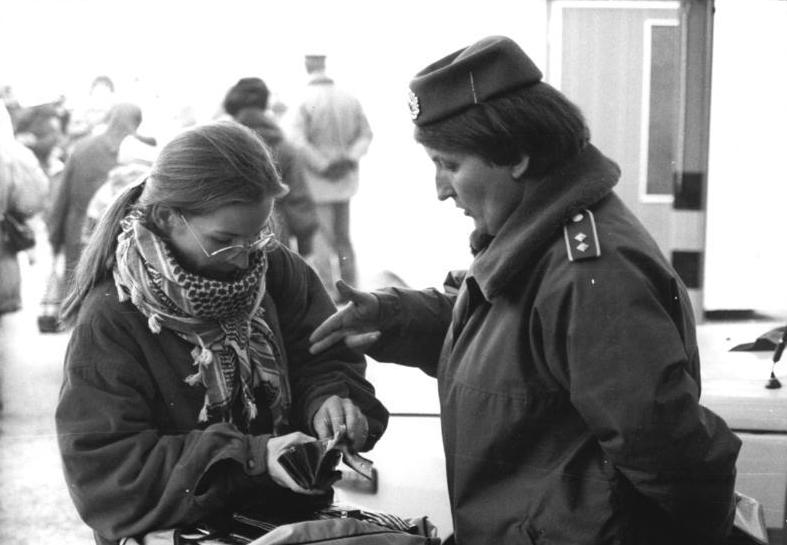
East German guards doing the job at the Rudower Chaussee crossing on 21 November 1989

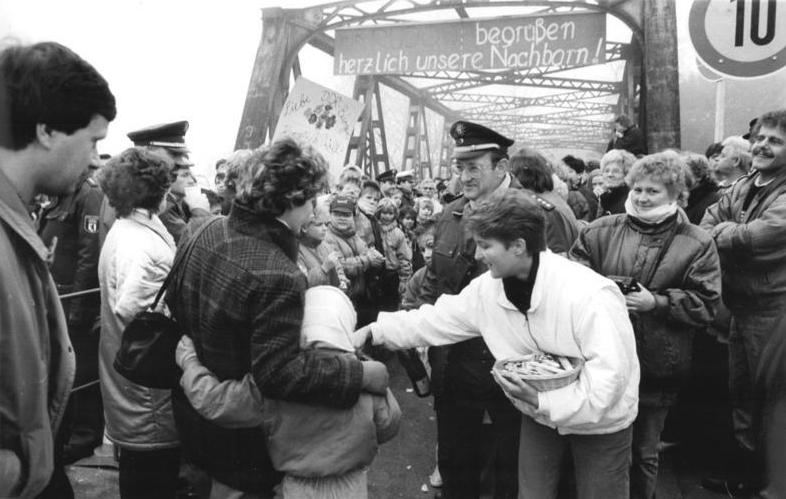
Scene at the Stubenrauchstraße crossing on 14 November 1989

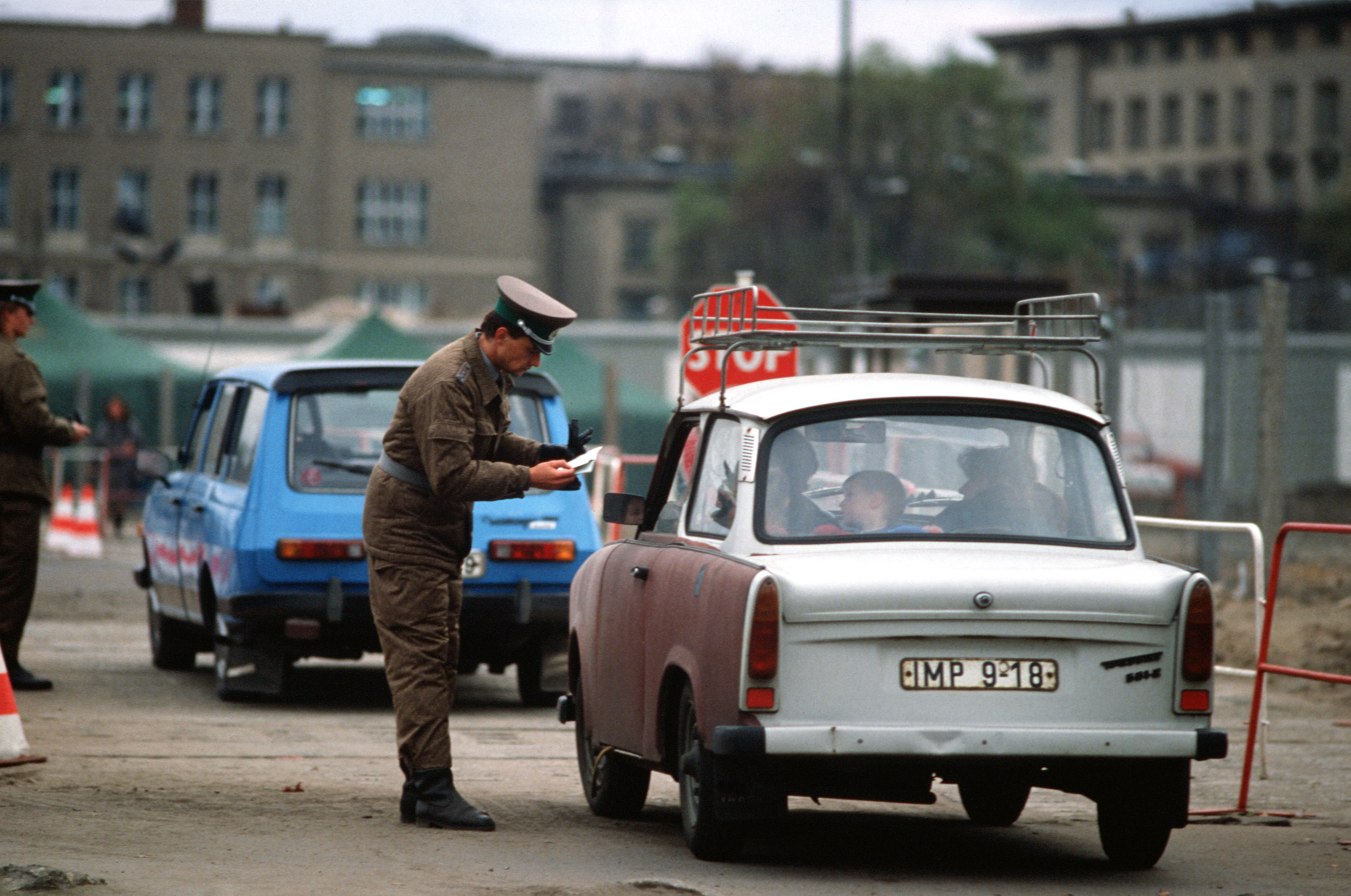
An East German policeman monitors traffic returning to East Berlin through the newly created opening in the Berlin Wall at Potsdamer Platz on 14 November 1989.

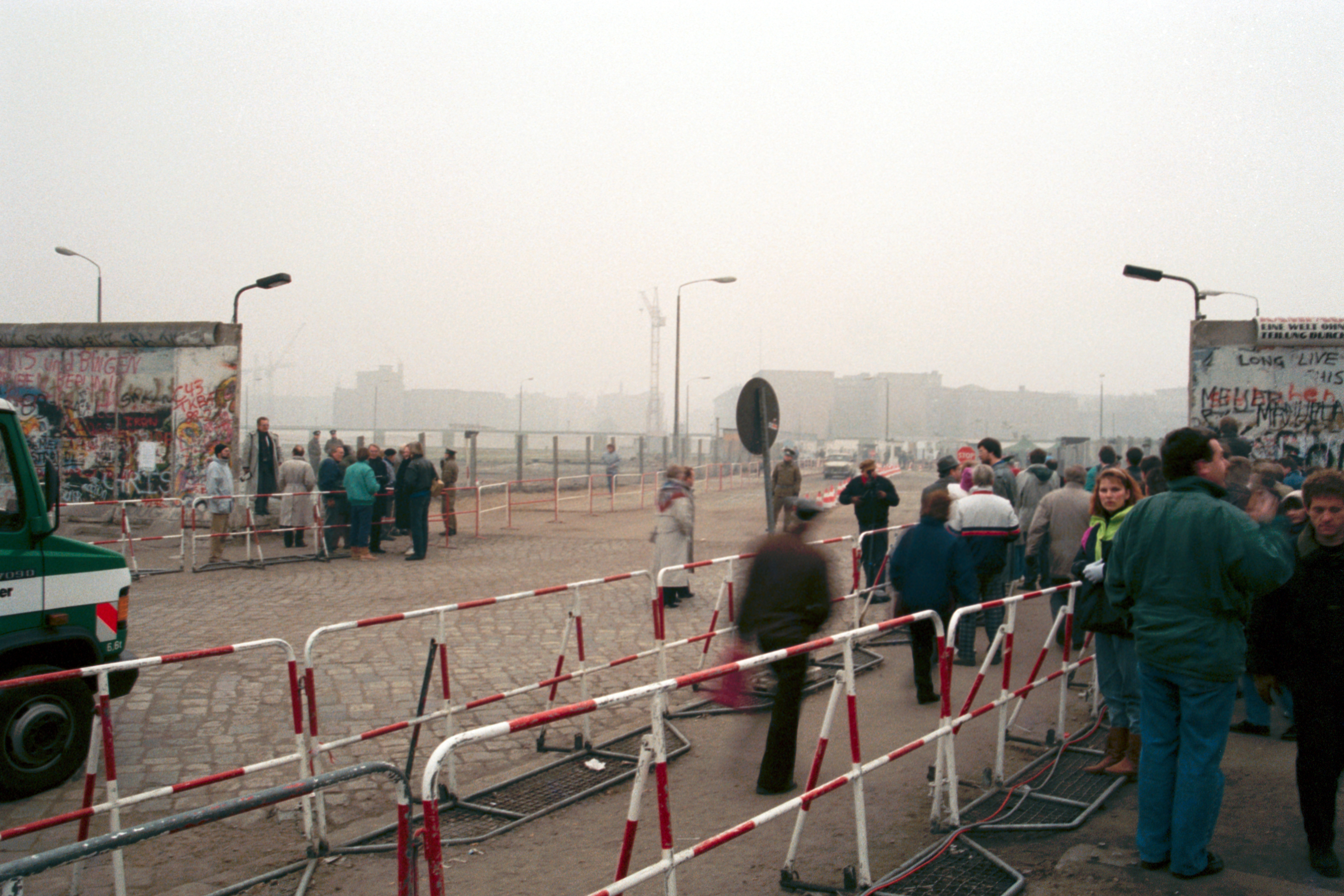
Newly created crossing between East and West Berlin at Potsdamer Platz in November 1989

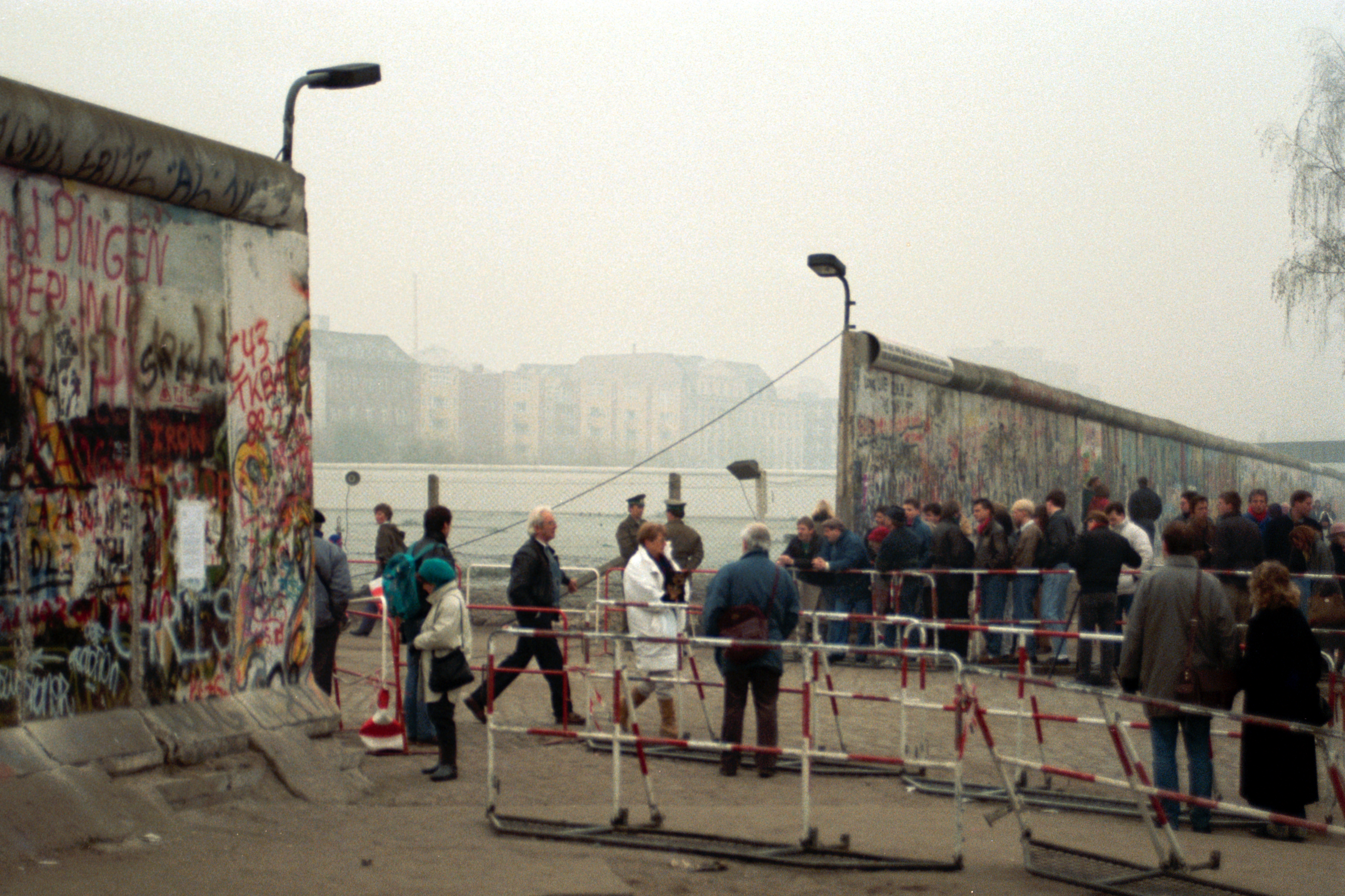
Newly created crossing between East and West Berlin at Potsdamer Platz in November 1989

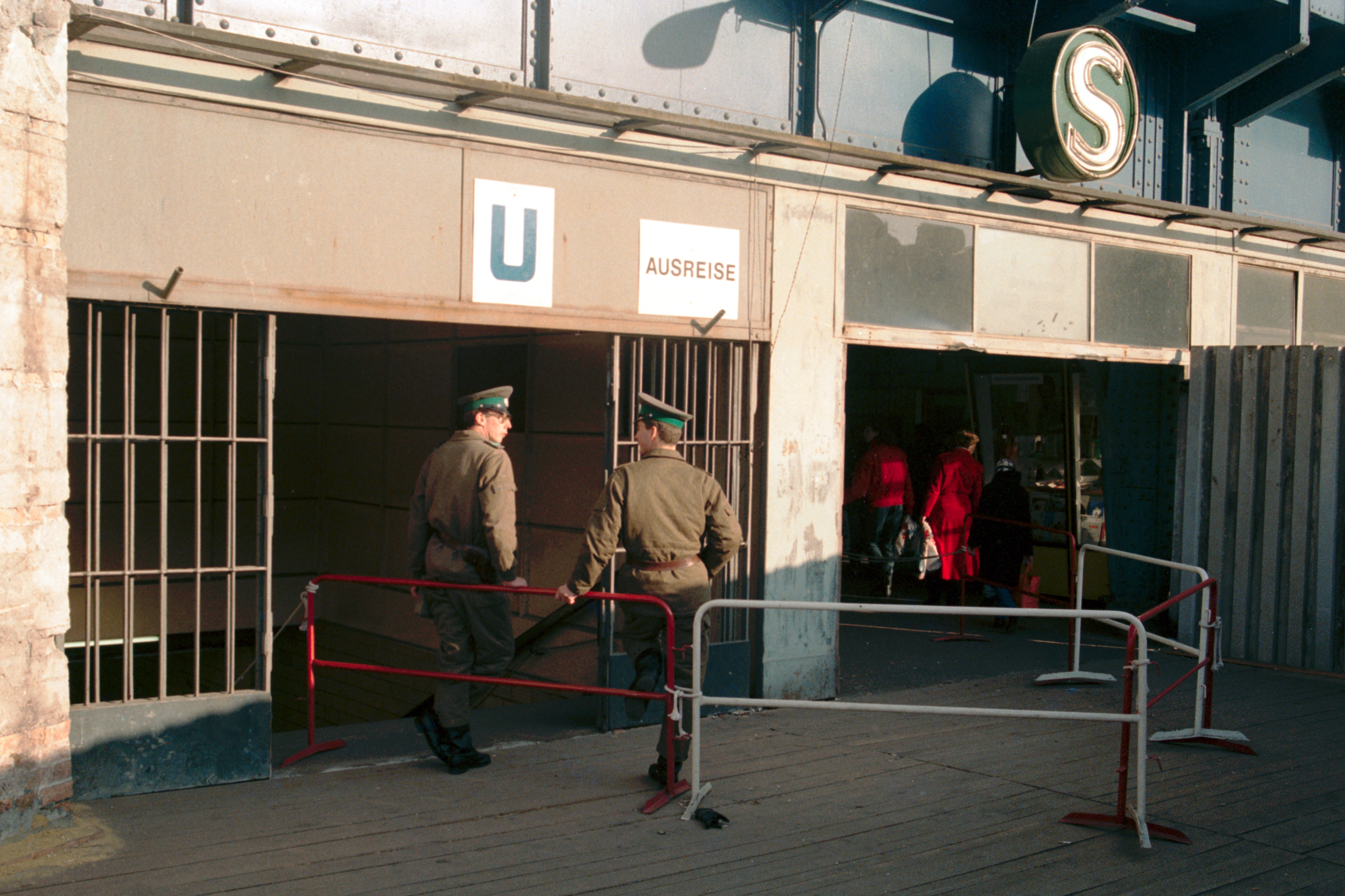
East German border guards at walkway linking the S-Bahn and U-Bahn platforms, which is under West Berlin jurisdiction, at the Jannowitzbrücke subway station in November 1989

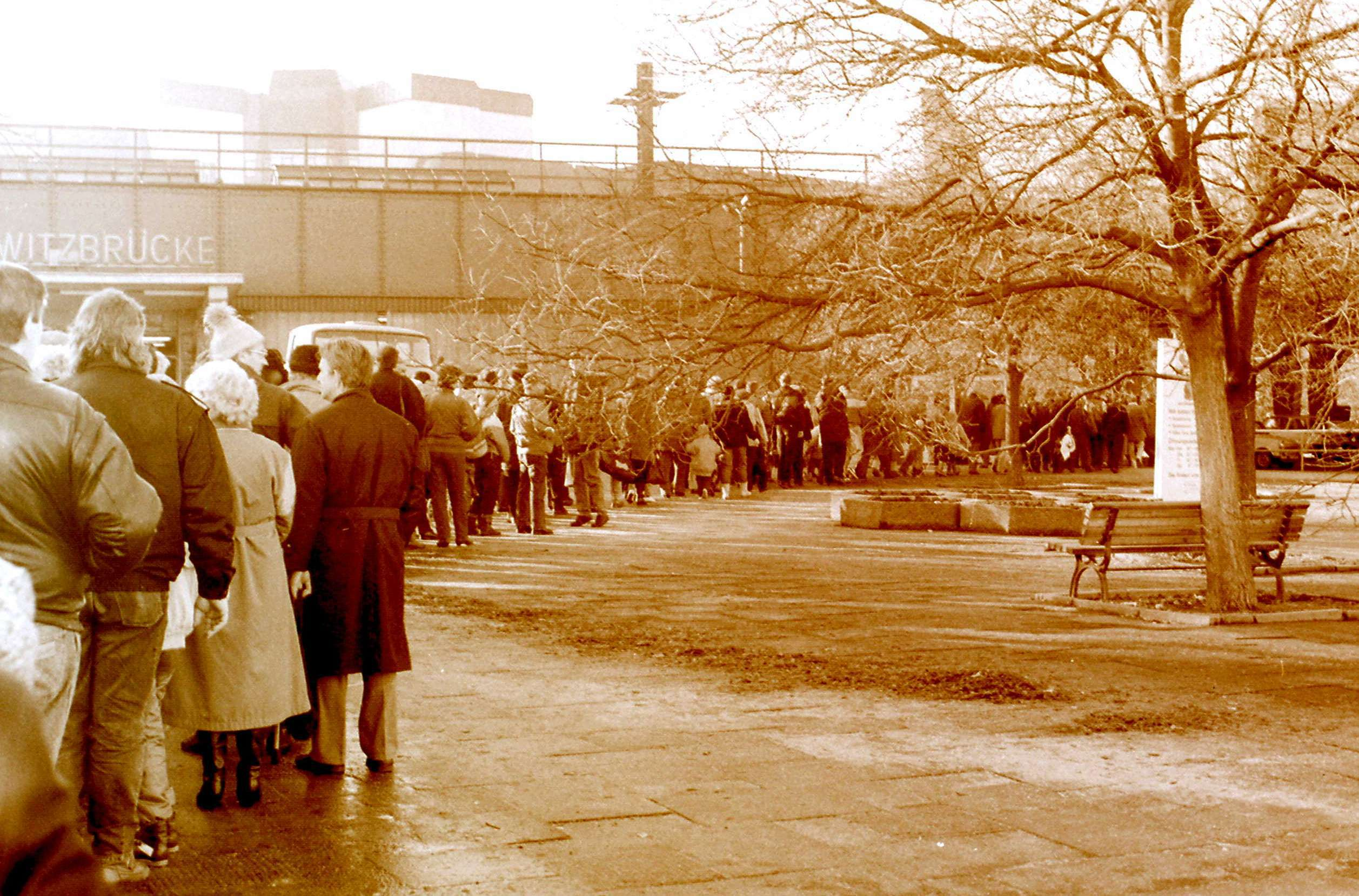
Long queues to cross the border at the Jannowitzbrücke subway station in November 1989

=== Border crossings stamps ===
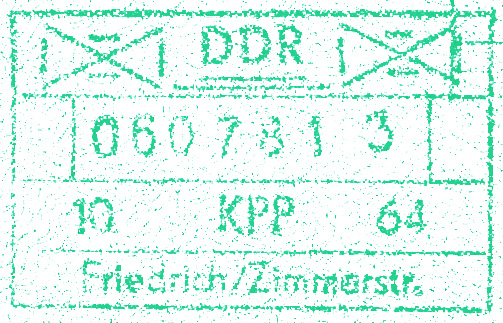
East German stamp from "Checkpoint Charlie" 1964

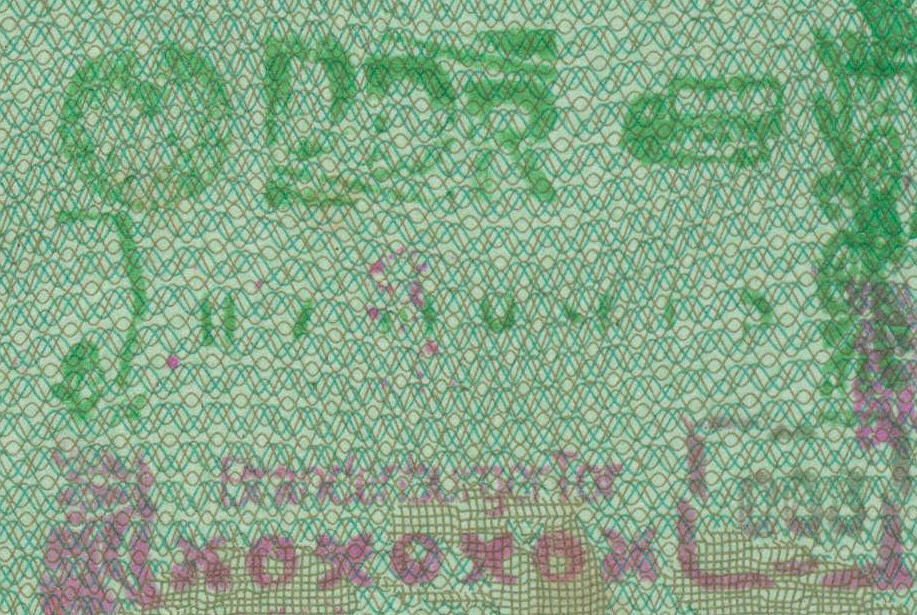
Brandenburg Gate pedestrian crossing passport stamp, 1990

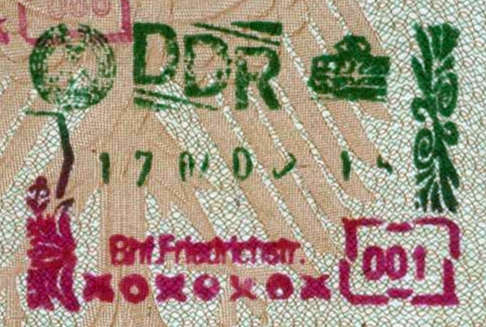
Friedrichstraße railway station crossing

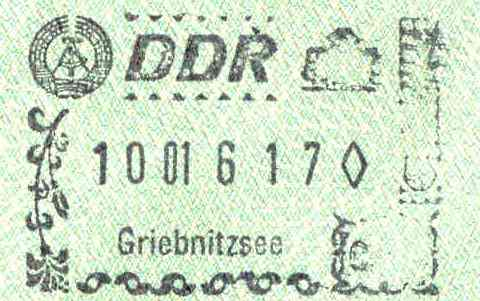
Griebnitzsee railway crossing

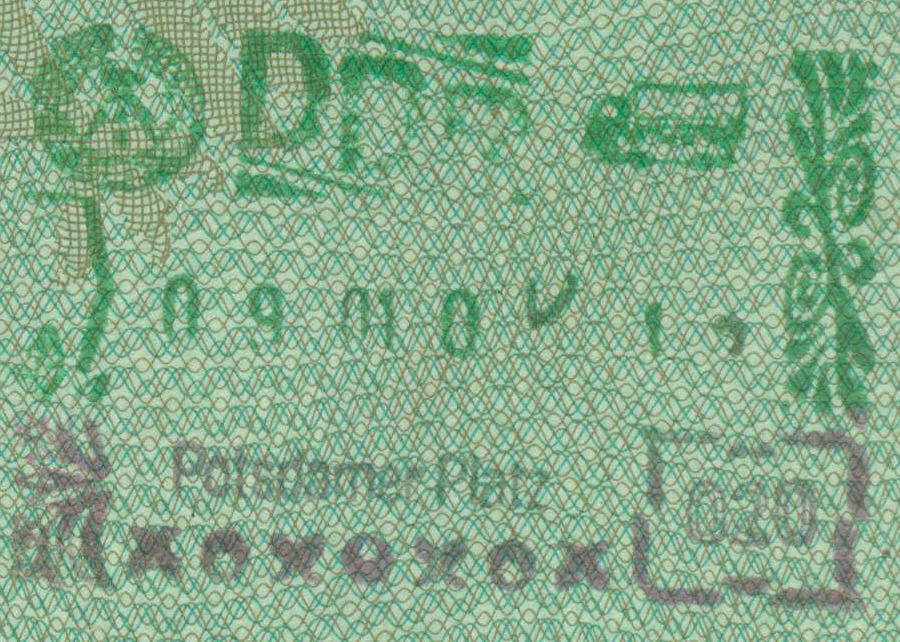
Potsdamer Platz road crossing, 1990

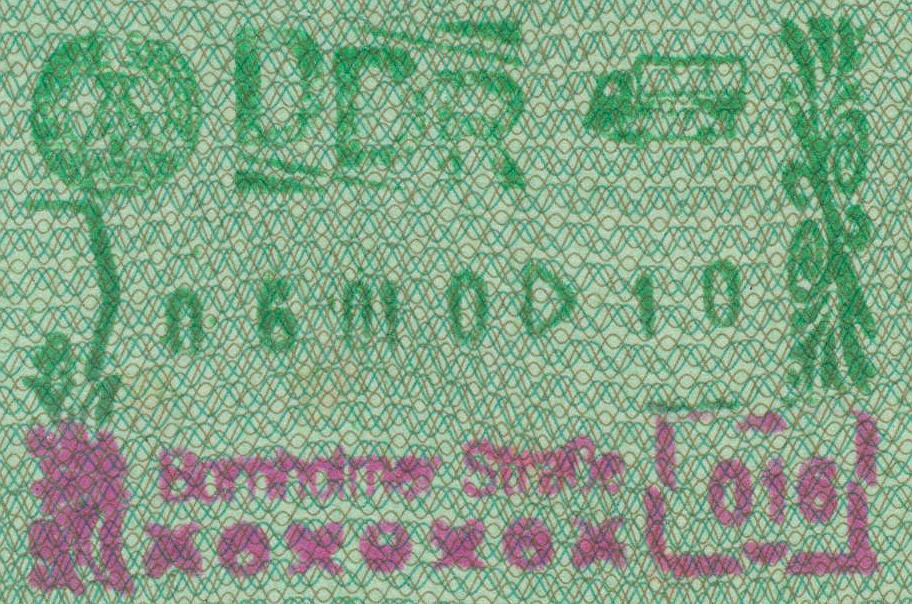
Bornholmer Straße road crossing, 1990

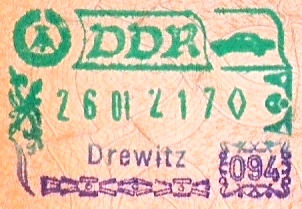
Drewitz crossing autobahn crossing

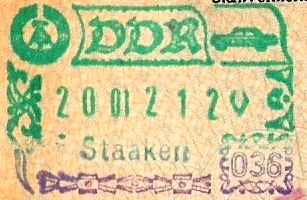
Staaken road crossing

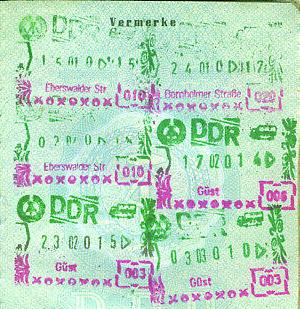
Bornholmer Straße and the newly opened Eberswalder Straße border crossings

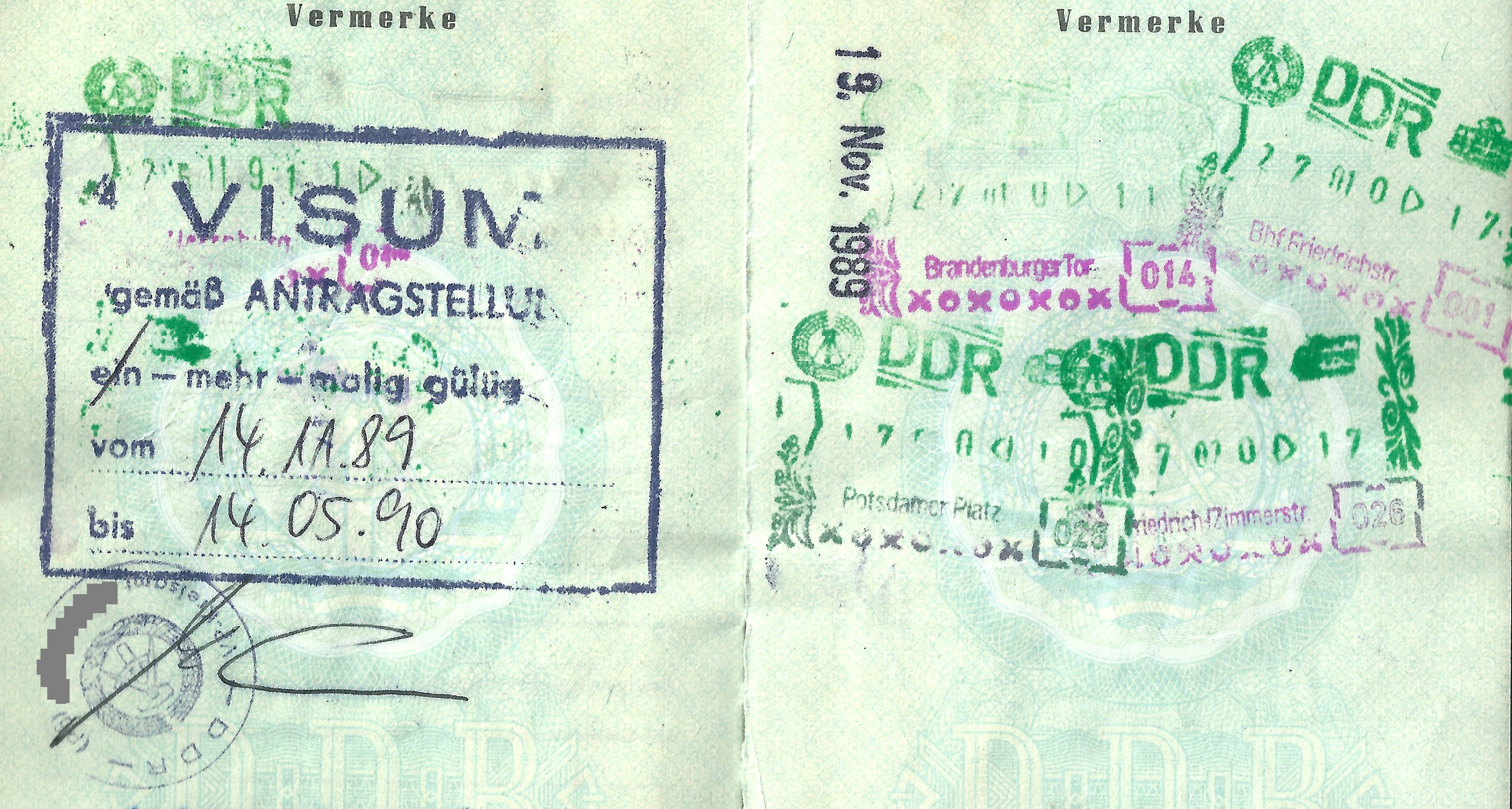
Stamps from the Brandenburg Gate and Potsdamer Platz crossings, as well as the Friedrichstraße railway station crossing and Friedrichstraße crossing, which is better known as Checkpoint Charlie

== Bibliography ==
- Hans-Dieter Behrendt: Im Schatten der "Agentenbrücke" (In the shadow of the "Agents' Bridge"), 260 pages, GNN Verlag, ISBN 3-89819-140-0 (in German)
- Durie, William (2012). The British Garrison Berlin 1945 - 1994: nowhere to go ... a pictorial historiography of the British Military occupation / presence in Berlin. Berlin: Vergangenheitsverlag (de). ISBN 978-3-86408-068-5. OCLC 978161722.

== See also ==
- Inner German border
