= Schwanheide station =

Railway station in Germany

Schwanheide
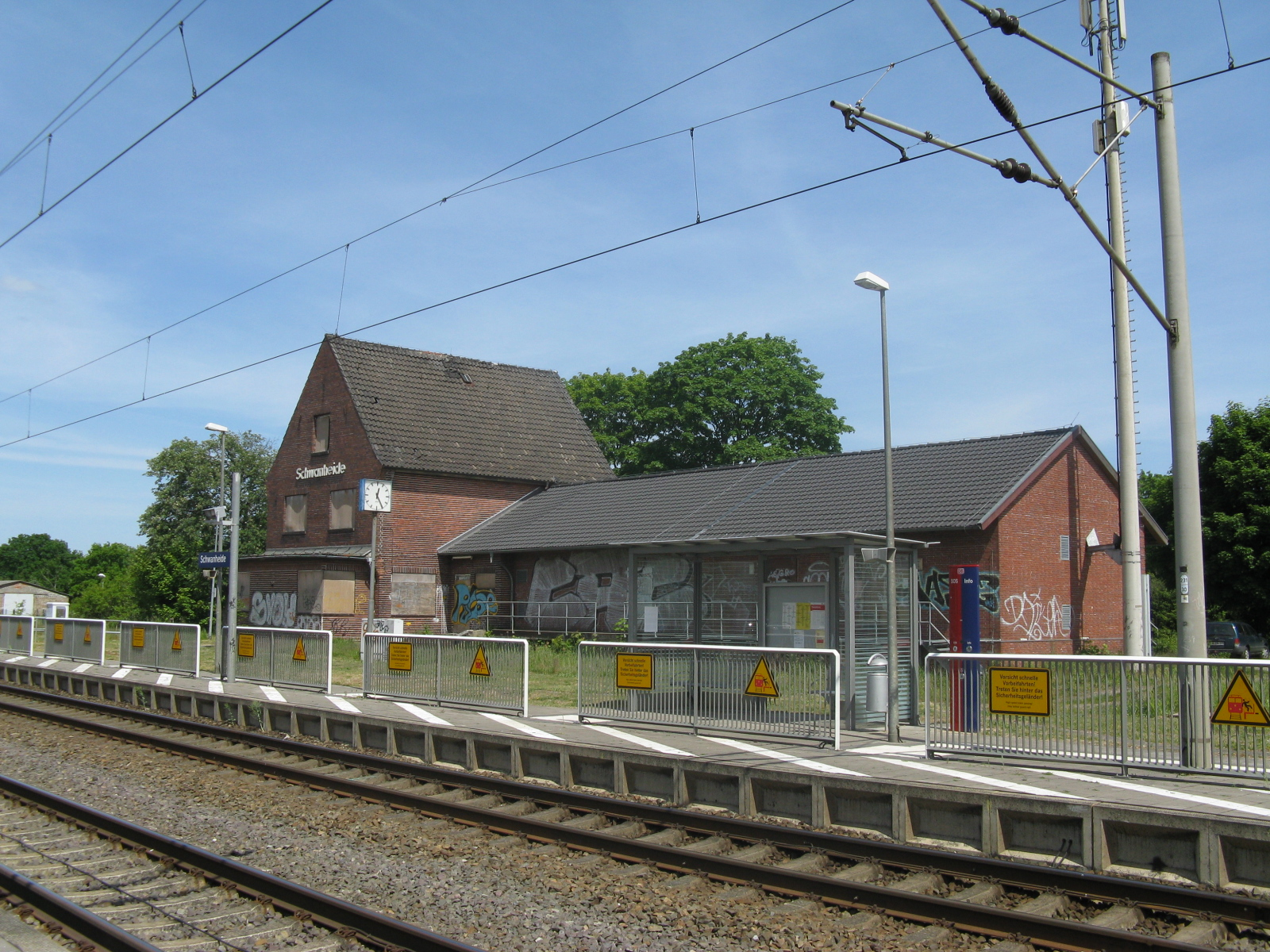
- Station building in 2008 (demolished in 2012)

General information
- Location: Bahnhofstr. 11, Schwanheide, MV; Germany
- Coordinates: 53°25′40″N 10°41′25″E
- Owner: DB Netz
- Operator: DB Station&Service
- Lines: Berlin–Hamburg (232.7 km) (KBS 100)
- Platforms: 2
- Tracks: 2
- Train operators: DB Regio Nordost

Construction
- Accessible: Yes

Other information
- Station code: 5714
- DS100 code: WSAH
- IBNR: 8012933
- Category: 6
- Website: www.bahnhof.de

History
- Opened: 1 December 1886; 139 years ago
- Electrified: 29 September 1996; 29 years ago, 15 kV 16 2/3 Hz AC system (overhead)

Services
Preceding station	DB Regio Nordost	Following station
Büchen towards Hamburg Hbf	RE 1	Boizenburg (Elbe) towards Rostock Hbf
Location

Schwanheide station was a border station during the division of Germany on the Berlin–Hamburg Railway in the German Democratic Republic. It is in the Mecklenburg town of Schwanheide, which is now in the state of Mecklenburg-Vorpommern. With the upgrade of the Berlin–Hamburg railway under the German Unity Transport Projects, the former railway station was reduced in status to a “halt”.

== History ==
Schwanheide station was opened on 1 December 1886. Originally, the station only offered passenger services. From 1 May 1908, the station catered for freight traffic and was equipped with a loading dock.

After the Second World War, the Berlin–Hamburg railway between Schwanheide and Büchen was divided by the Inner German border. On the eastern side, one of the two main tracks between Berlin and Schwanheide was dismantled for reparations. Even on the West German side, the second track was also dismantled between the former border station of Büchen and Schwarzenbek.

Traffic was initially completely interrupted at the demarcation line, especially since the bridges over the Elbe–Lübeck Canal in Büchen had been destroyed. In the summer of 1946, the bridge was restored, but freight operations were not resumed until 27 August 1947. First, it was agreed that a pair of passenger trains could also run, but they were not introduced. For the time being three through freight trains each day ran in each direction and were handed over between Büchen and Schwanheide. In the autumn of the same year it was agreed to operate additional freight trains. During the Berlin Blockade in 1948, traffic decreased significantly, but did not come to a complete standstill. On 10 September 1949, passenger traffic was resumed with two pairs of trains, one operated by railcars of the Cologne class (Bauart Köln), which were derived from the Flying Hamburger.

The cross-border rail service on the more northerly route between Herrnburg and Lübeck was closed in 1952; it was restored in 1960. In 1953, ten regular and three as-required freight trains ran on the Berlin–Hamburg line towards the west and five regular and three as-required freight trains ran towards the east. In 1953, a hut was established for transit clearance on platform 1 and a second platform track and an island platform were built. This was later followed by the building of platform tracks 3 and 4.

Freight trains in transit to and from West Berlin stopped in Schwanheide from 1965. However, the track capacity in Schwanheide was not sufficient to carry out border control procedures for passengers and freight. Therefore, freight trains were handled in Kuhlenfeld station, which was 18 km from the border. Before departure of a freight train from the so-called "wagon border crossing" (Wagengrenzstelle) at Kuhlenfeld, it had to be ensured that Boizenburg and Schwanheide stations could take the train. If the train had to make an intermediate stop, the border controls would have to be repeated in Schwanheide, which led to delays for other trains.

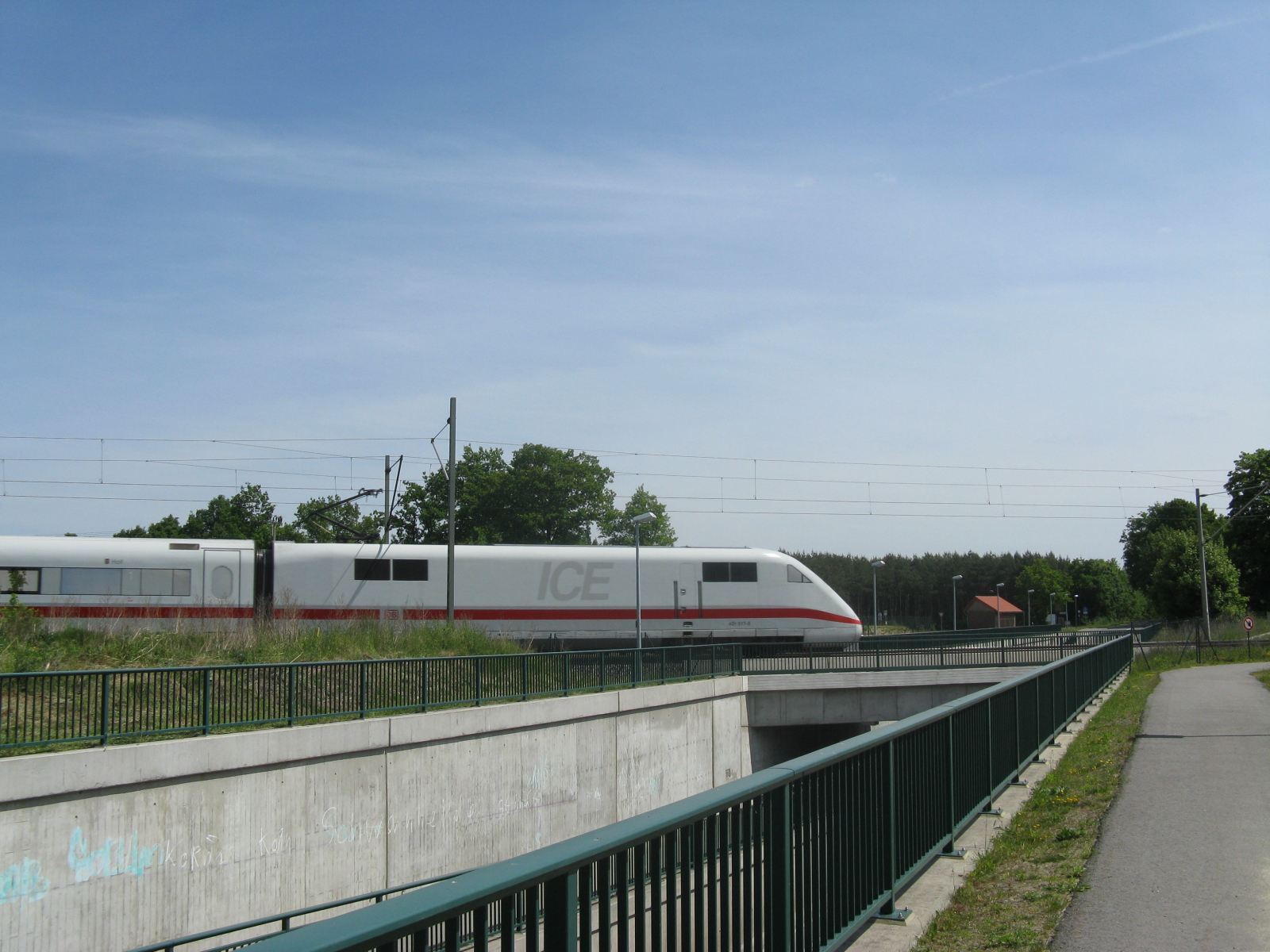
Intercity-Express passing through Schwanheide station (2008)

A new terminal building was built in the early 1980s. As a result of Die Wende (the change), express trains no longer stopped in Schwanheide after 30 September 1990. With the upgrade of the line as part of the German Unity Transport Projects (Verkehrsprojekte Deutsche Einheit), the section between Hagenow Land and Büchen via Schwanheide was electrified in 1996. The tracks through the station were reduced to two through tracks and so the station was reduced in status to a Haltepunkt (meaning "halt", which in Germany describes a station without points). With a further upgrade of the line to a top speed of 230 km/h in 2004/2005, the level crossing near the station was replaced by an underpass.

== Railway and border control facilities ==
Passengers who travelled on domestic trains to Schwanheide required a permit or a passport for the journey into the Federal Republic. Railway employees had to swap their laissez-passers during working stays at the station in exchange for special passes so that the passport control unit had an overview of the people present. Trains to Schwanheide were checked by transport police at Hagenow Land station before they arrived at Schwanheide. To strengthen this policy, travellers in the area from outside the town were stopped at the limits of Boizenburg and asked about their reasons for a trip there.

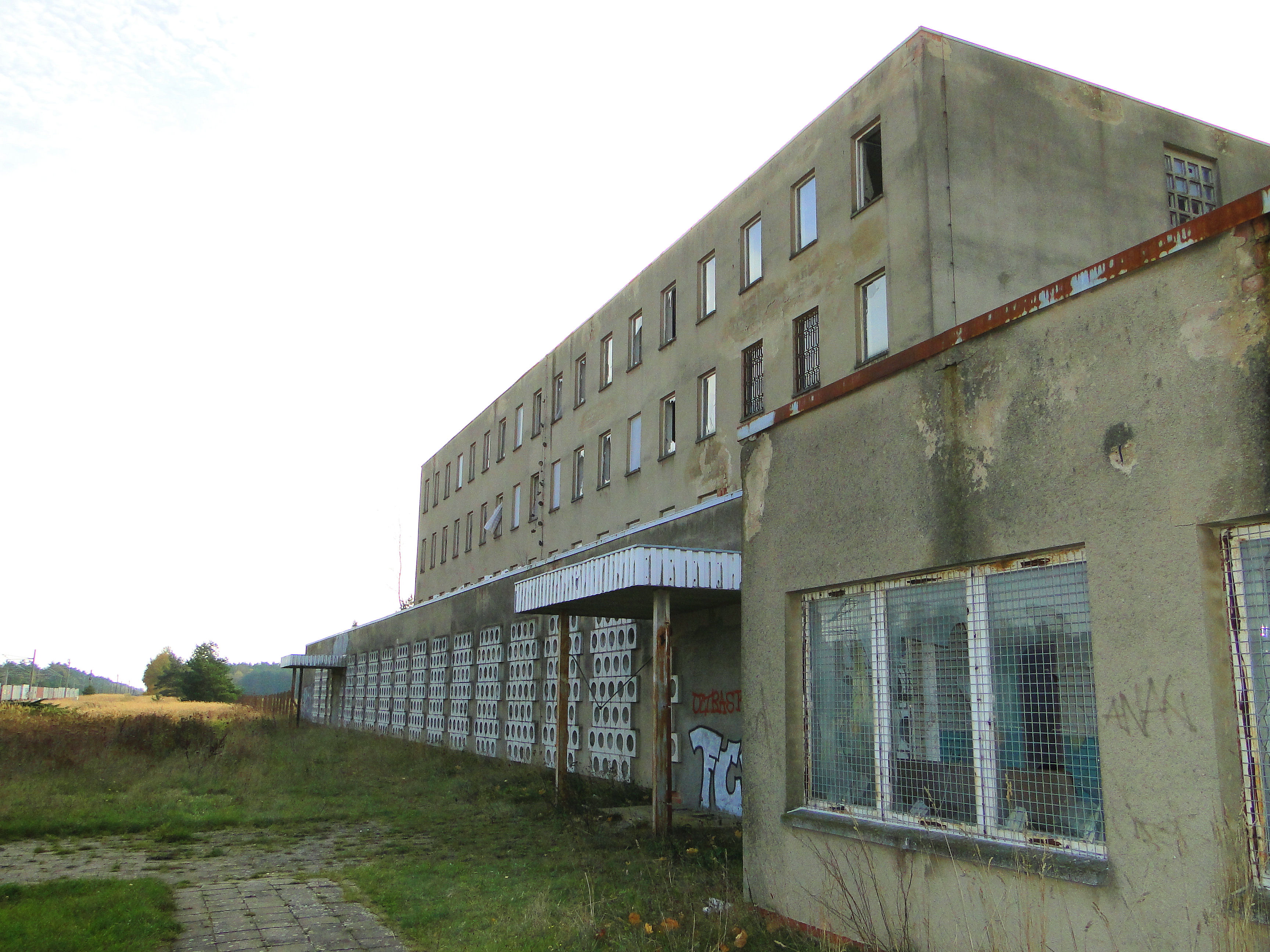
Abandoned border control building (2013)

The station itself was equipped with five platform tracks in the 1980s. Track 1 was located next to the building housing the border clearance facilities and Mitropa, tracks 2 and 3 were on an island platform and track 4 and a shortened fifth track were next to the entrance building, which was also the location of the mechanical signalbox “B 2”. A second mechanical signalbox “W 1” was located at the eastern end of the station. On both sides of the station, the tracks were spanned by bridges carrying posts from which border troops observed the entering and exiting trains. The supervision for the border clearance was located on the island platform.

The station area was fenced up on the track entrances and was lit at night as bright as day. A branch from track 3 was provided for trains terminating in Schwanheide.

Running through without stopping or following a second train that was already moving towards the border was made impossible by technical protection devices. In addition to passport and baggage checks, dogs were used to prevent refugees using the trains. Train messages from railway staff to Büchen were recorded and could be controlled and evaluated by the security services. If graffiti, such as swastikas or slogans hostile to East Germany, were inscribed on oncoming freight trains from Büchen, they could be removed or painted over in Schwanheide.

== Rail services ==
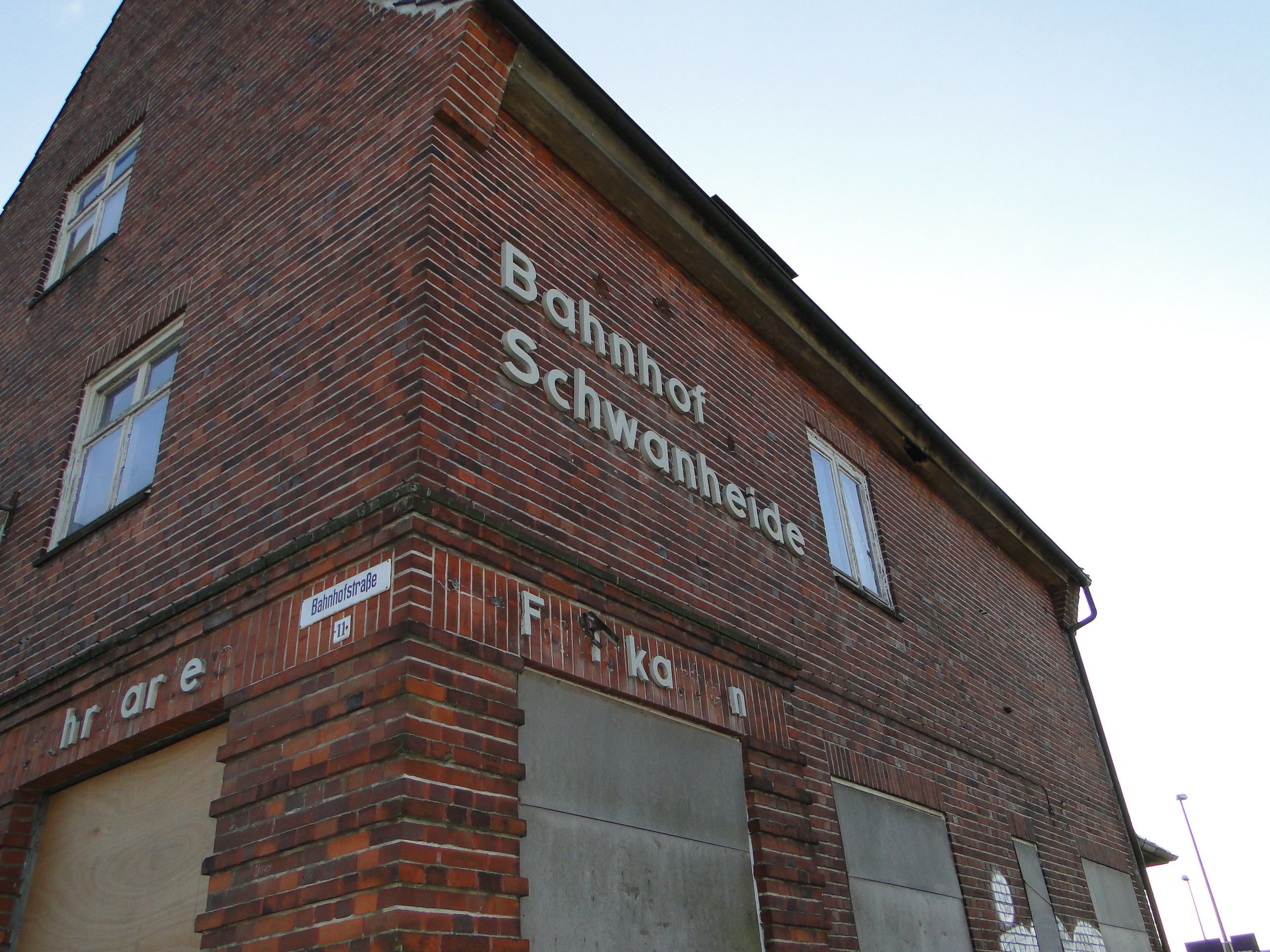
Boarded windows and doors at the entrance building (2010)

Regional-Express services on the Hamburg–Rostock route stop in Schwanheide. The line is built for speeds of up to 230 km/h. Express trains pass through the station at high speeds, requiring the platforms to be secured by safety gates with warning signs. The border crossing building stands empty and exposed to vandalism. The station building, which was also empty, was demolished in 2012.

Line	Route	Frequency
RE 1	Hamburg Hbf – Schwanheide – Hagenow Land — Schwerin – Rostock – Stralsund	2 h
