= Tiefer See =

Lake in Mecklenburg-Vorpommern, Germany

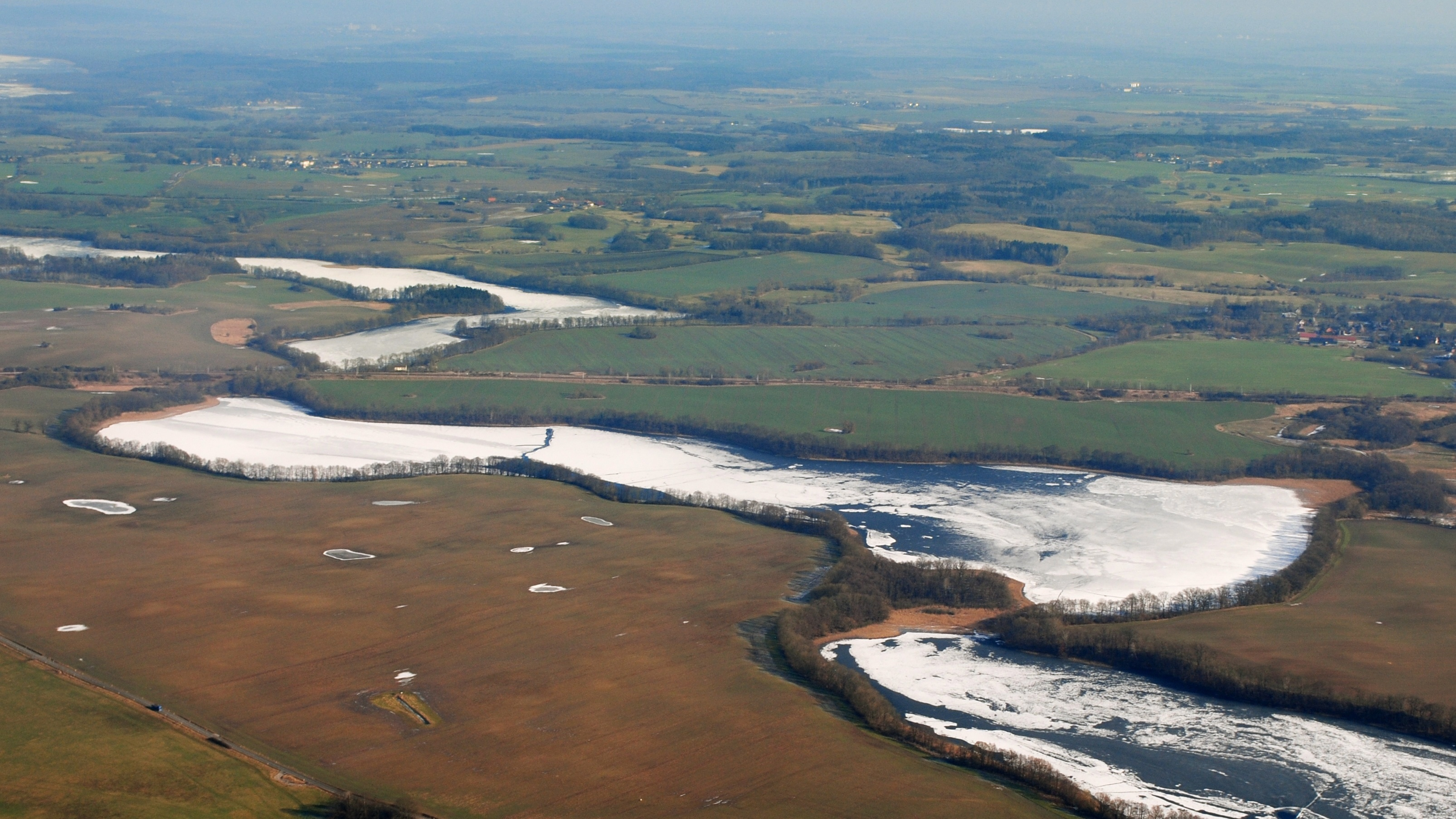
- view of Tiefer See Lake

- Location within Mecklenburg-Vorpommern
- Location: Mecklenburgische Seenplatte, Mecklenburg-Vorpommern
- Coordinates: 53°35′44″N 12°31′42″E
- Basin countries: Germany
- Surface area: 0.76 km^{2} (0.29 sq mi)
- Average depth: 18.5 m (61 ft)
- Max. depth: 62.5 m (205 ft)
- Surface elevation: 62.9 m (206 ft)

Tiefer See is a lake in the Mecklenburgische Seenplatte district in Mecklenburg-Vorpommern, Germany. At an elevation of 62.9 m, its surface area is 0.76 km^{2}.
