= Schwanheide =

- Municipality
- Coat of arms

- Location of Schwanheide within Ludwigslust-Parchim district
- Interactive map of Schwanheide
- Location within Germany Location within Mecklenburg-Vorpommern
- Coordinates: 53°25′N 10°40′E
- Country: Germany
- State: Mecklenburg-Vorpommern
- District: Ludwigslust-Parchim
- Municipal assoc.: Boizenburg-Land
- Subdivisions: 3

Government
  - Mayor: Gerd Altenburg

Area
  - Total: 26.51 km^{2} (10.24 sq mi)
- Elevation: 17 m (56 ft)

Population (2025-12-31)
  - Total: 687
  - Density: 25.9/km^{2} (67.1/sq mi)
- Time zone: UTC+01:00 (CET)
  - Summer (DST): UTC+02:00 (CEST)
- Postal codes: 19258
- Dialling codes: 038842, 038847
- Vehicle registration: LWL
- Website: www.amtboizenburgland.de

Schwanheide is a municipality in the Ludwigslust-Parchim district, in Mecklenburg-Vorpommern, Germany.

== History ==
Between 1945 and 1990 Schwanheide station served as East German inner German border crossing for rail transport. The crossing was open for trains travelling between the Soviet Zone of occupation in Germany (till 1949, thereafter the East German Democratic Republic, or West Berlin and the British zone of occupation (till 1949) and thereafter the West German Federal Republic of Germany. The traffic was subject to the Interzonal traffic regulations, that between West Germany and West Berlin followed the special regulations of the Transit Agreement (1972).
