= Checkpoint Charlie =

Crossing point in the Berlin Wall

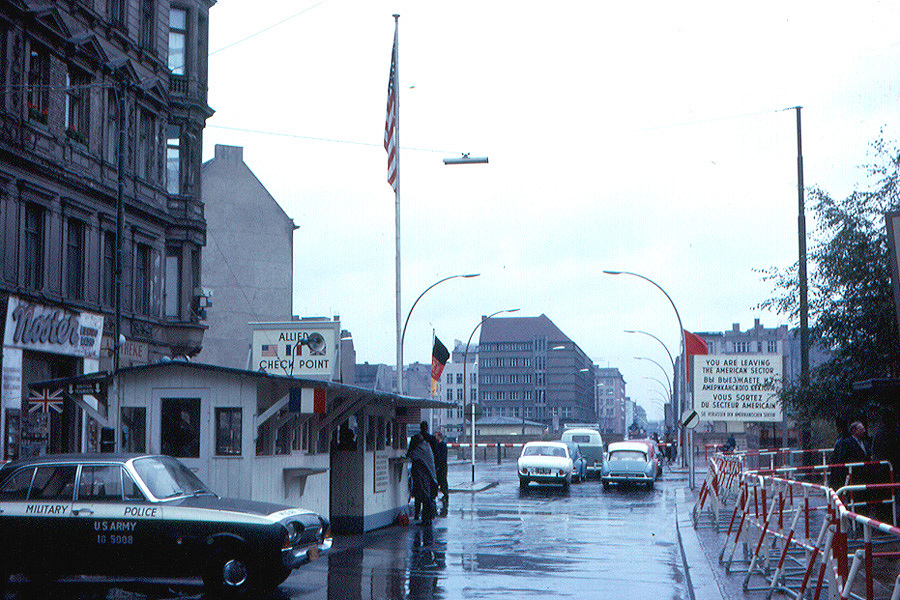
- A view of Checkpoint Charlie in 1963, from the American sector

Location
- Country: East Germany
- Location: Friedrichstraße at Zimmerstraße and Mauerstraße at the West Berlin–East Berlin border
- Coordinates: 52°30′27″N 13°23′25″E

Details
- Opened: 13 August 1961
- Closed: 3 October 1990

Map of Berlin Wall with location of Checkpoint Charlie

Checkpoint Charlie (or "Checkpoint C") was the Western Bloc's name for the best-known Berlin Wall crossing point between East Berlin and West Berlin during the Cold War (1947–1991), becoming a symbol of the Cold War, representing the separation of East and West.

East German leader Walter Ulbricht agitated and maneuvered to get the Soviet Union's permission to construct the Berlin Wall in 1961 to prevent brain drain, emigration and defection from East Berlin and the wider German Democratic Republic into West Berlin.

Soviet and American tanks briefly faced each other at the location during the Berlin Crisis of 1961. On 26 June 1963, U.S. President John F. Kennedy visited Checkpoint Charlie and looked from a platform onto the Berlin Wall and into East Berlin, the same day he gave his famous Ich bin ein Berliner speech.

After the dissolution of the Eastern Bloc and the reunification of Germany, the American guard house at Checkpoint Charlie became a tourist attraction. It is now located in the Allied Museum in the Dahlem neighborhood of Berlin.

== Background ==
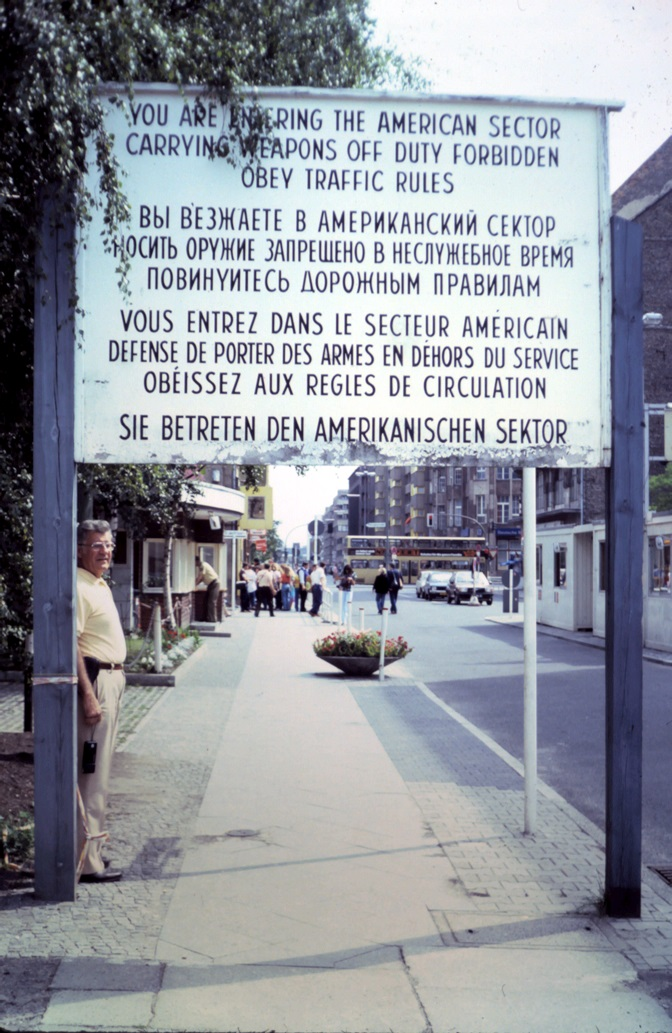
Sign at Checkpoint Charlie on the way into West Berlin, as it appeared in 1981

=== Emigration restrictions, the Inner German border and Berlin ===
Between 1949 and 1961, over 2½ million East Germans fled to the West. The numbers increased during the three years before the Berlin Wall was erected, with 144,000 in 1959, 199,000 in 1960 and 207,000 in the first seven months of 1961 alone. The 3.5 million East Germans who had left by 1961 totaled approximately 20% of the entire East German population.

The emigrants tended to be young and well educated, including many professionals — engineers, technicians, physicians, teachers, lawyers and skilled workers. The brain drain became damaging to the political credibility and economic viability of East Germany.

By the early 1950s, the Soviet method of restricting emigration was emulated by most of the rest of the Eastern Bloc, including East Germany. However, in occupied Germany, until 1952, the lines between East Germany and the western occupied zones remained easily crossed in most places. Subsequently, the inner German border between the two German states was closed and a barbed-wire fence erected.

Even after closing of the inner German border officially in 1952, the city sector border in between East Berlin and West Berlin remained considerably more accessible than the rest of the border because it was administered by all four occupying powers, so Berlin became the main route by which East Germans left for the West.

=== Berlin Wall constructed ===
On 13 August 1961, a barbed-wire barrier that would become the Berlin Wall separating East and West Berlin was erected by the East Germans. Two days later, police and army engineers began to construct a more permanent concrete wall. Along with the wall, the 830-mile (1336 km) zonal border became 3.5 miles (5.6 km) wide on its East German side in some parts of Germany with a tall steel-mesh fence running along a "death strip" bordered by mines, as well as channels of ploughed earth, to slow escapees and more easily reveal their footprints.

== Checkpoint ==
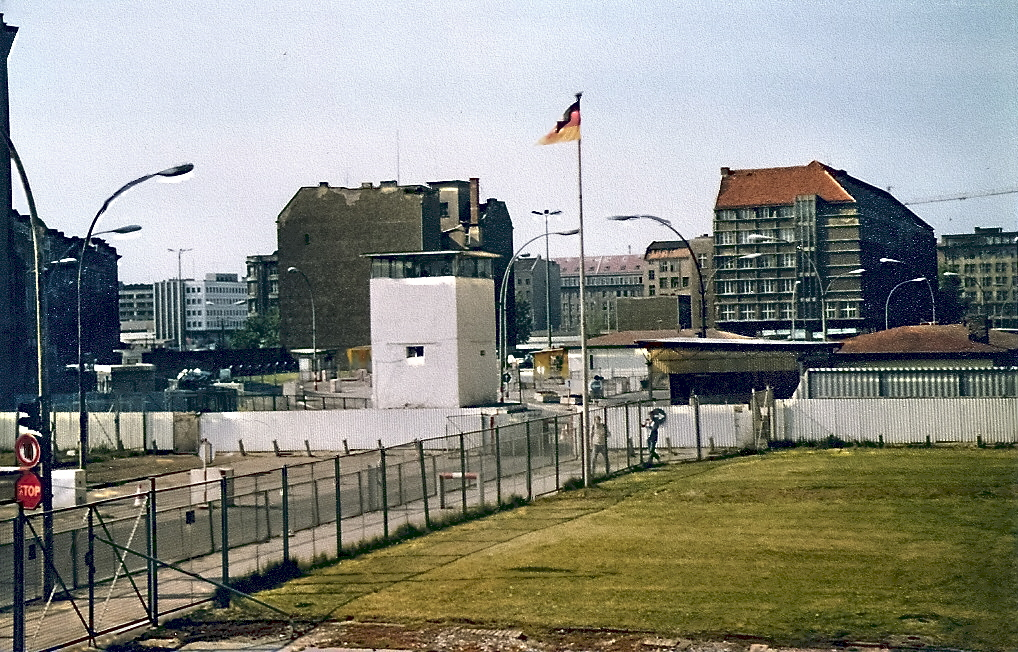
Soviet Zone from Checkpoint Charlie observation post, 1982

Checkpoint Charlie was a crossing point in the Berlin Wall located at the junction of Friedrichstraße with Zimmerstraße and Mauerstraße (which for older historical reasons coincidentally means Wall Street). It is in the Friedrichstadt district. Checkpoint Charlie was the only "designated crossing point for foreign tourists and dignitaries and for members of the Allied armed forces", who were not allowed to use the other sector crossing point designated for use by foreigners, the Friedrichstraße railway station.

"The GDR had closed the border in Berlin ten weeks earlier and created a border crossing at the corner of Friedrichstrasse and Zimmerstrasse. It was meant to be used exclusively by Western Allied military personnel, diplomats and people from abroad. The Western Allies protested against this restriction on their freedom of movement, which was guaranteed to them through the city’s four-power status. But eventually they accepted it and set up their own checkpoint on the West Berlin side."

The name Charlie came from the letter C in the NATO phonetic alphabet; similarly for other Allied checkpoints on the Autobahn from the West: Checkpoint Alpha at Helmstedt and its counterpart Checkpoint Bravo at Dreilinden, Wannsee, in the south-west corner of Berlin. The Soviets simply called it the Friedrichstraße Crossing Point (КПП Фридрихштрассе, KPP Fridrikhshtrasse). The East Germans referred officially to Checkpoint Charlie as the Grenzübergangsstelle ("Border Crossing Point") Friedrich-/Zimmerstraße.

As the most visible Berlin Wall checkpoint, Checkpoint Charlie was featured in movies and books. A famous cafe and viewing place for Allied officials, armed forces and visitors alike, Cafe Adler ("Eagle Café"), was situated right on the checkpoint.

The development of the infrastructure around the checkpoint was largely asymmetrical, reflecting the contrary priorities of East German and Western border authorities. During its 28-year active life, East Germany significantly expanded its infrastructure to include not only the wall, watchtowers, and zig-zag barriers, but also a multi-lane shed where guards checked cars and their occupants. Nevertheless, the Allied authority never erected any permanent buildings. A wooden shed, initially used as the guardhouse, was replaced in May 1976 with a larger metal container, now displayed at the Allied Museum in western Berlin. They reasoned that they did not consider the inner Berlin sector boundary an international border and did not treat it as such.

== Related incidents ==
=== Stand-off between Soviet and U.S. tanks in October 1961 ===
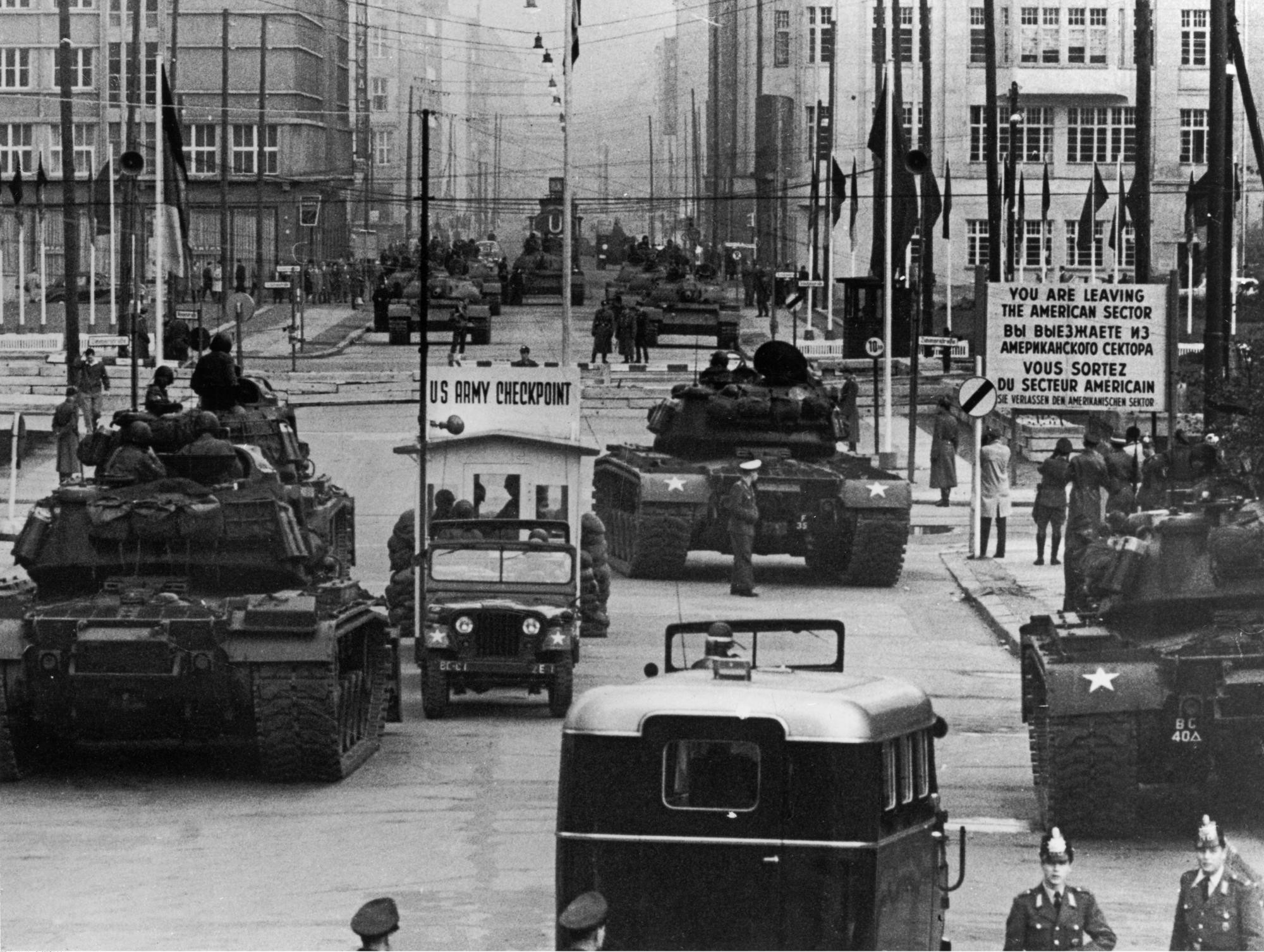
US M48 Patton tanks facing Soviet T-55 tanks at Checkpoint Charlie in October 1961

Soon after the construction of the Berlin Wall in August 1961, a stand-off occurred between US and Soviet tanks on either side of Checkpoint Charlie. It began on 22 October as a dispute over whether East German border guards were authorized to examine the travel documents of a US diplomat based in West Berlin named Allan Lightner heading to East Berlin to watch an opera show.

According to the agreement between all four Allied powers occupying Germany, there was to be free movement for Allied forces in all of Berlin, and no German military forces from either West Germany or East Germany were to be based in the city. The Western Allies also did not initially recognise the East German state and its right to remain in its self-declared capital of East Berlin, and only recognised the authority of the Soviets over East Berlin.

By 27 October, ten Soviet and an equal number of American tanks stood 100 yards apart on either side of the checkpoint. This stand-off ended peacefully on 28 October following a US-Soviet understanding to withdraw tanks and reduce tensions. Discussions between US Attorney General Robert F. Kennedy and Soviet intelligence officer Georgi Bolshakov played a vital role in realizing this tacit agreement.

=== Early escapes ===
The Berlin Wall was erected with great speed by the East German government in 1961, but there were initially many means of escape that had not been anticipated. For example, Checkpoint Charlie was initially blocked only by a gate, and a citizen of the GDR (East Germany) smashed a car through it to escape, so a strong pole was erected. Another escapee approached the barrier in a convertible, the windscreen removed prior to the event, and slipped under the barrier. This was repeated two weeks later, so the East Germans duly lowered the barrier and added uprights.

=== Death of Peter Fechter ===
Fechter's body lying next to the Berlin Wall after being shot in 1962 while trying to escape to the West

On 17 August 1962, a teenaged East German, Peter Fechter, was shot in the pelvis by East German guards while trying to escape from East Berlin. His body lay tangled in a barbed wire fence as he bled to death in full view of the world's media. He could not be rescued from West Berlin because he was a few metres inside the Soviet sector. East German border guards were reluctant to approach him for fear of provoking Western soldiers, one of whom had shot an East German border guard just days earlier. More than an hour later, Fechter's body was removed by the East German guards. A spontaneous demonstration formed on the West German side of the checkpoint, protesting against the action of the East and the inaction of the West.

A few days later, a crowd threw stones at Soviet buses driving towards the Soviet War Memorial, located in the Tiergarten in the British sector; the Soviets tried to escort the buses with armoured personnel carriers (APCs). Thereafter, the Soviets were only allowed to cross via the Sandkrug Bridge crossing (which was the nearest to Tiergarten) and were prohibited from bringing APCs. Western units were deployed in the middle of the night in early September with live armaments and vehicles, in order to enforce the ban.

== Today ==
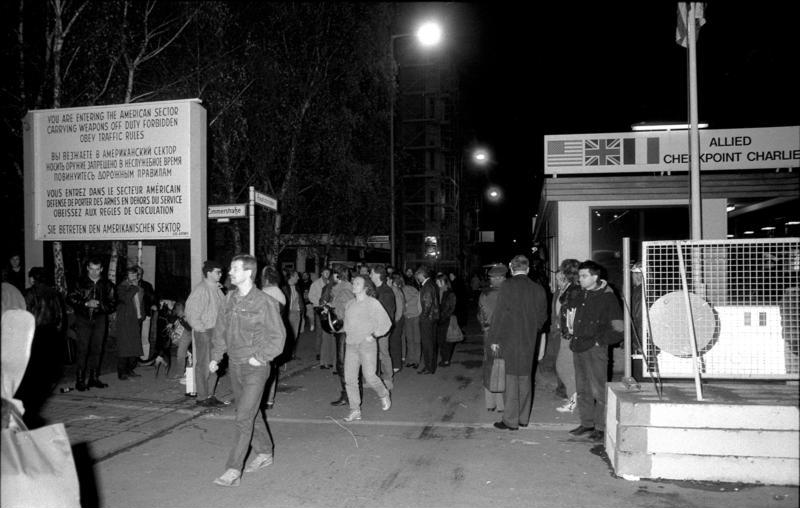
On the night of 9 November 1989 when a part of the Wall was opened

Although the wall was opened in November 1989 and the checkpoint booth removed on 22 June 1990, the checkpoint remained an official crossing for foreigners and diplomats until German reunification in October 1990.

Checkpoint Charlie has since become one of Berlin's primary tourist attractions, where some original remnants of the border crossing blend with reconstructed parts, memorial and tourist facilities.

The guard house on the American side was removed in 1990; it is now on display in the open-air museum of the Allied Museum in Berlin-Zehlendorf. A copy of the guard house and the sign that once marked the border crossing was reconstructed later on roughly the same site. It resembles the first guard house erected during 1961, behind a sandbag barrier toward the border. Over the years this was replaced several times by guard houses of different sizes and layouts. The one removed in 1990 was considerably larger than the first one and did not have sandbags.

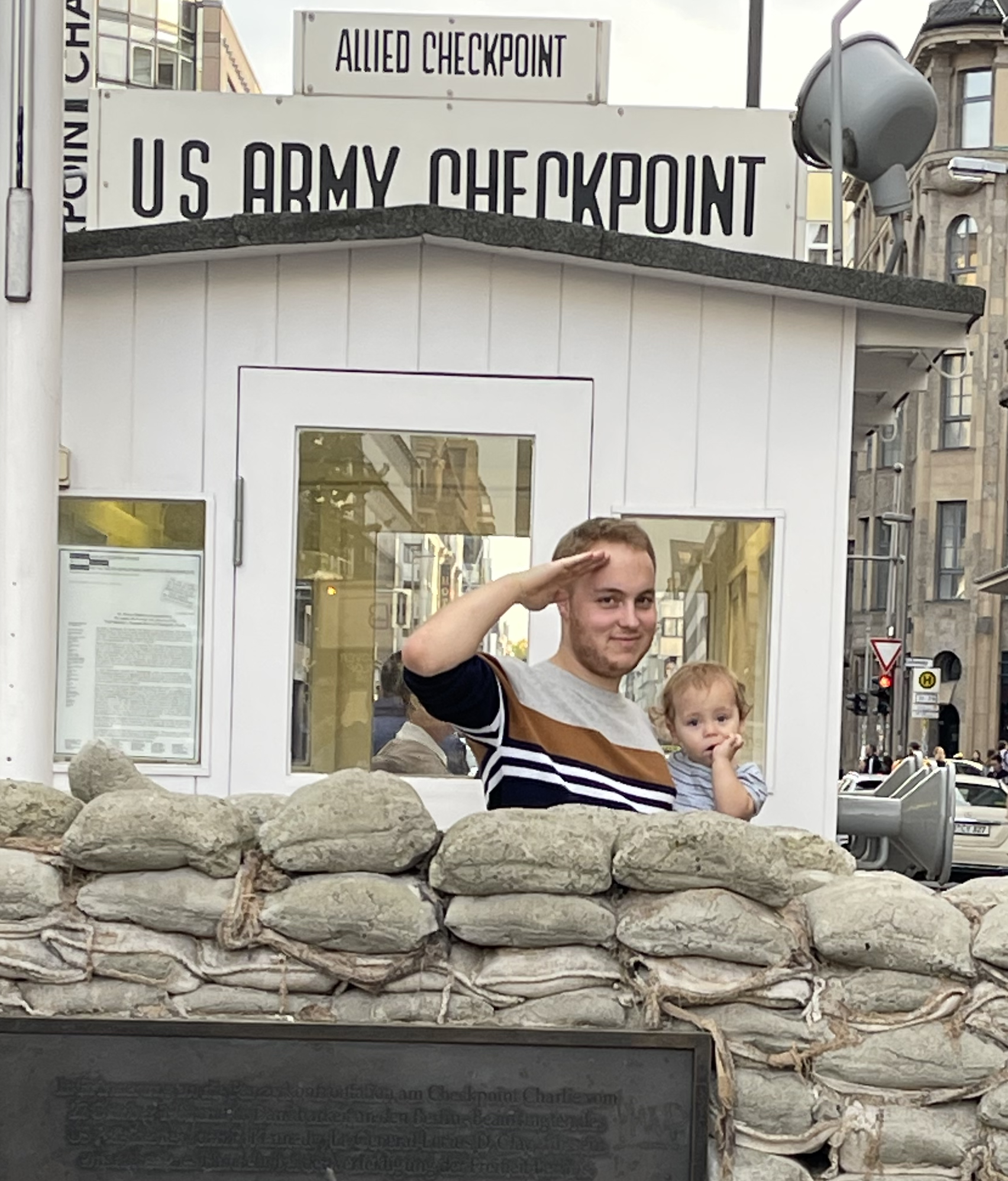
Tourist and child posing at the replica US Army guardhouse.

Tourists used to be able to have their photographs taken for a fee with actors dressed somewhat as Allied military police standing in front of the guard house, but Berlin authorities banned the practice in November 2019, stating that the actors had been exploiting tourists by demanding money for photos at the attraction.

The course of the former wall and border is now marked in the street with a line of cobblestones. An open-air exhibition was opened during the summer of 2006. Gallery walls along Friedrichstraße and Zimmerstraße give information about escape attempts, how the checkpoint was expanded, and its significance during the Cold War, including the confrontation of Soviet and American tanks in 1961, and an overview of other important memorial sites and museums about the division of Germany and the wall.

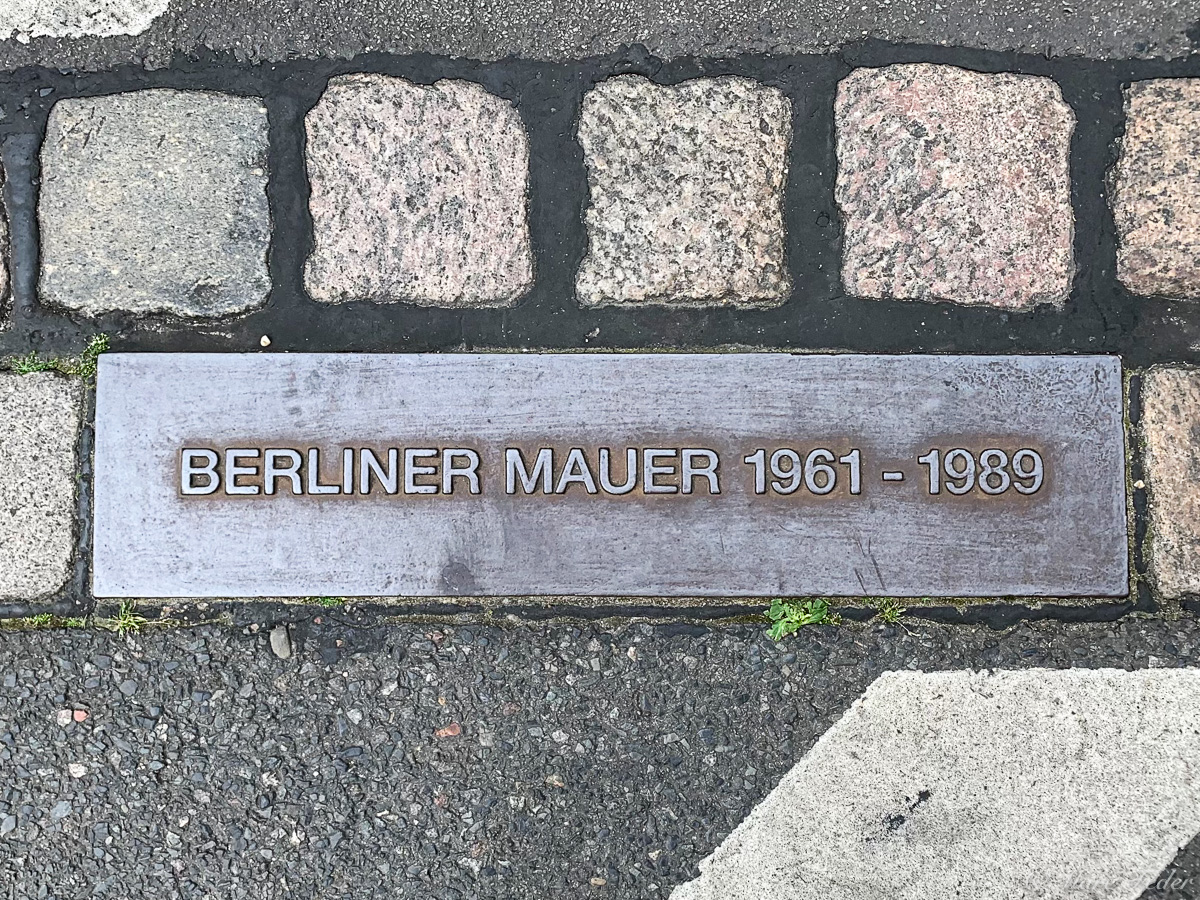
Former Berlin Wall marker

Developers demolished the last surviving major original Checkpoint Charlie structure, the East German watchtower, in 2000, to make way for offices and shops. The city tried to save the tower but failed, as it was not classified as a historic landmark, but the development was never realised.

New plans since 2017 for a hotel on the site stirred a professional and political debate about appropriate development of the area. After the final listing of the site as a protected heritage area in 2018, plans were changed towards a more heritage-friendly approach, but the area between Zimmerstraße and Mauerstraße/Schützenstraße remains vacant, providing space for a number of temporary tourist and memorial uses.

=== BlackBox Cold War Exhibition ===
The "BlackBox Cold War" exhibition has illuminated the division of Germany and Berlin since 2012. The free open-air exhibition offers original Berlin Wall segments and information about the historic site. However, the indoor exhibition (entrance fee required) illustrates Berlin's contemporary history with 16 media stations, a movie theatre and original objects and documents. It is run by the NGO Berliner Forum fuer Geschichte und Gegenwart e.V..

=== Checkpoint Charlie Museum ===
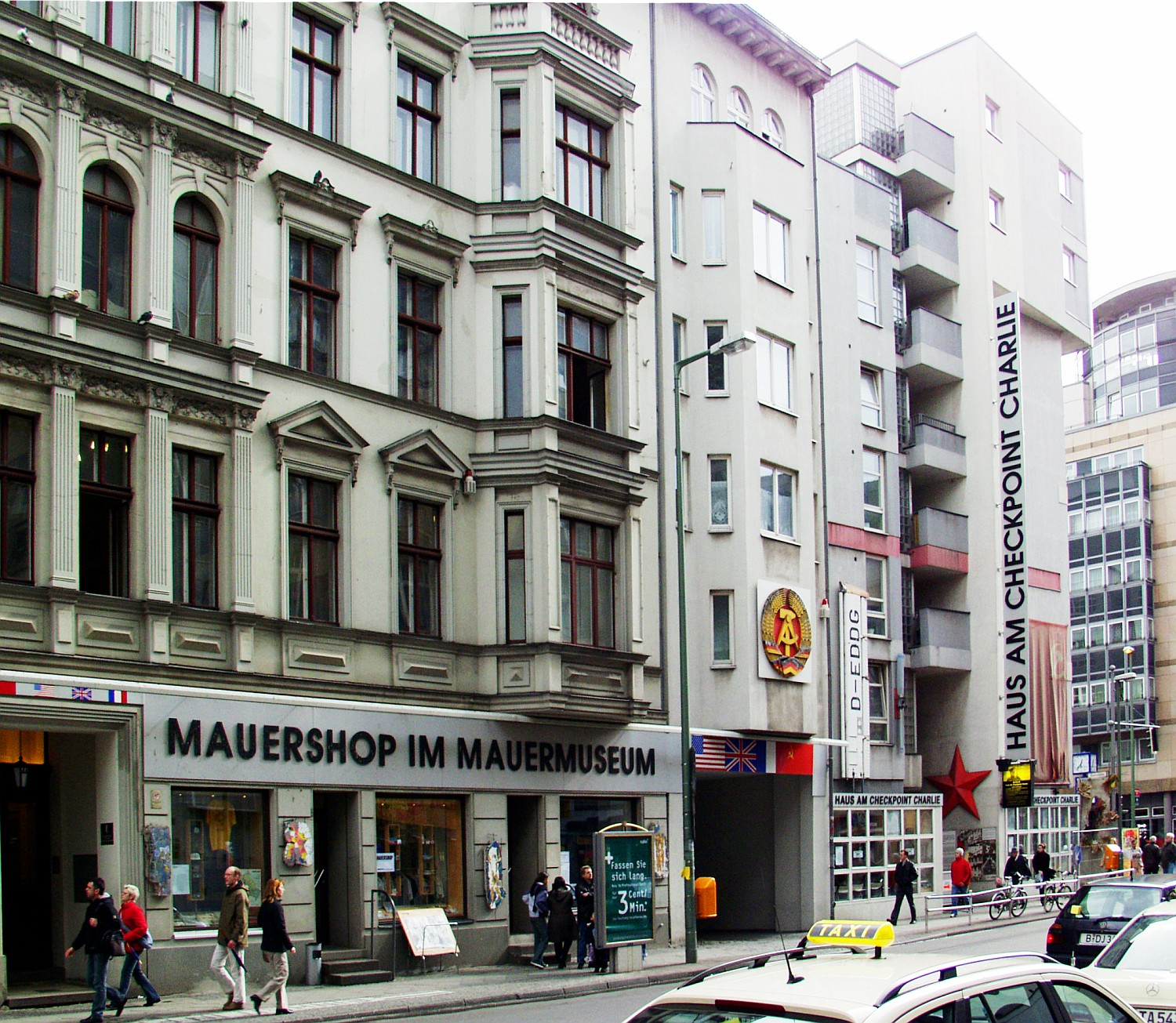
Checkpoint Charlie Museum

Near the location of the guard house is the Haus am Checkpoint Charlie. The "Mauermuseum - Museum Haus am Checkpoint Charlie" was opened on 14 June 1963 in the immediate vicinity of the Berlin Wall. It shows photographs and fragments related to the separation of Germany. The border fortifications and the "assistance of the protecting powers" are illustrated. In addition to photos and documentation of successful escape attempts, the exhibition also showcases escape devices including a hot-air balloon, escape cars, chair lifts, and a mini-submarine.

From October 2004 until July 2005, the Freedom Memorial, consisting of original wall segments and 1,067 commemorative crosses, stood on a leased site.

The museum is operated by the Arbeitsgemeinschaft 13. August e. V., a registered association founded by Dr. Rainer Hildebrandt. The director is Alexandra Hildebrandt, the founder's widow. The museum is housed in part in the "House at Checkpoint Charlie" building by architect Peter Eisenman.

With 850,000 visitors in 2007, the Checkpoint Charlie Museum is one of the most visited museums in Berlin and in Germany.

== Trivia ==
At the border crossing from Hyder in Alaska, USA to Stewart in British Columbia, Canada, there is a humorous imitation of the Checkpoint Charlie sign with the inscription "You are leaving the American Sector" in English, French, and German, as well as a sign reading "Eastern Sektor", as Stewart is located east of Hyder. Hyder is the only place in the USA that can be legally entered without any border control. The sign was erected in 2015 as a protest after the Canadian administration announced plans to close the border control at night.

During the 1950s and 1960s the Portas do Cerco was also referred to as Far Eastern Checkpoint Charlie with a major border incident happening in 1952 with Portuguese African Troops exchanging fire with Chinese Communist border guards. According to reports, the exchange lasted for one and three quarter hours leaving one dead and several dozens injured on the Macau side and more than 100 casualties claimed on the Communist Chinese side.

== See also ==
- List of tourist attractions in Berlin
