= Antonia Rados =

Austrian television journalist

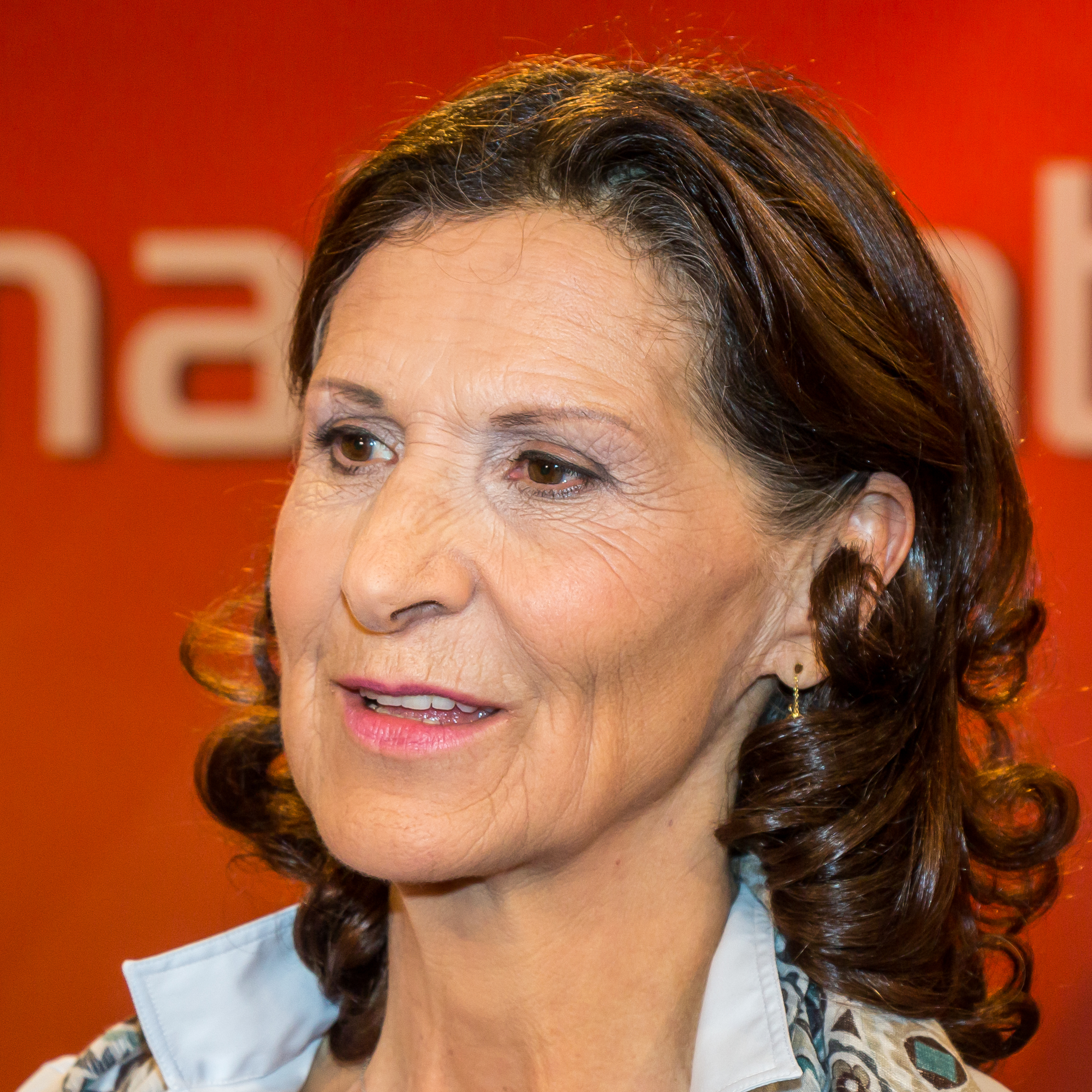

Antonia Rados (born 15 June 1953 in Klagenfurt, Carinthia) is an Austrian television journalist who worked for RTL Television from 1993 to 2022.

Now a political scientist with a PhD, Rados began her career in 1978 at ORF. Working as a foreign correspondent for Austrian national radio from the late 1970s to the early 1990s, she gained a reputation as a crisis reporter, most notably for her first-hand coverage of the Romanian Revolution of 1989. In 1991, she joined WDR as a special correspondent, and left in 1993 to join RTL Television. Her live coverage from Baghdad during the Iraq War brought her attention on a national level. Antonia Rados' coverage from Baghdad in 2003 was highly praised in the field of TV reporting, and consequently she won several prizes including the Hanns Joachim Friedrichs-Award for TV journalism. She shifted to ZDF, a public-service TV broadcaster, for a short time in 2008, but returned to RTL within the same year. In March 2011, she interviewed Libyan dictator Muammar Gaddafi.

The veteran war correspondent and Middle East expert made a name for herself mainly with her dedicated reporting and features from war zones. Rados has also won awards for her documentaries: in 2007, she received the Robert Geisendörfer Award and the German Camera Award for Feuertod, her moving feature about Afghani women who choose to set themselves on fire rather than go on living. In August 2011, she was nominated for an International Emmy Award in the "Current Affairs" category for a documentary about pirate activities in Hobyo, Somalia. Rados lives with her spouse in Paris, France.

== Career ==
- Degree in political science (study in Paris and Salzburg), later PhD in political science
- 1978–1980 freelancer at ORF
- 1980–1984 Foreign Affairs Editorial Department at ORF
- 1984–1985 correspondent in Washington, D.C., Rome and Vienna for ORF
- 1991 correspondent for WDR
- 1995–2008 correspondent for RTL Television in Kosovo, Africa, Afghanistan, the Middle East and Iraq. Head of the RTL Television department in Paris
- 2008 Documentaries abroad as well as correspondent for ZDF heute-journal
- Since January 2009 Chief International Reporter for RTL Media Group

== Awards ==
- 2003: Hanns-Joachim-Friedrichs-Award
- 2011: Rados received the Dr. Rainer Hildebrandt Human Rights Award endowed by Alexandra Hildebrandt. The award is given annually in recognition of extraordinary, non-violent commitment to human rights.
