= Checkpoint Bravo =

Main Autobahn border crossing point between East Germany and West Berlin

Coordinates: 52°24′58.86″N 13°11′49.02″E

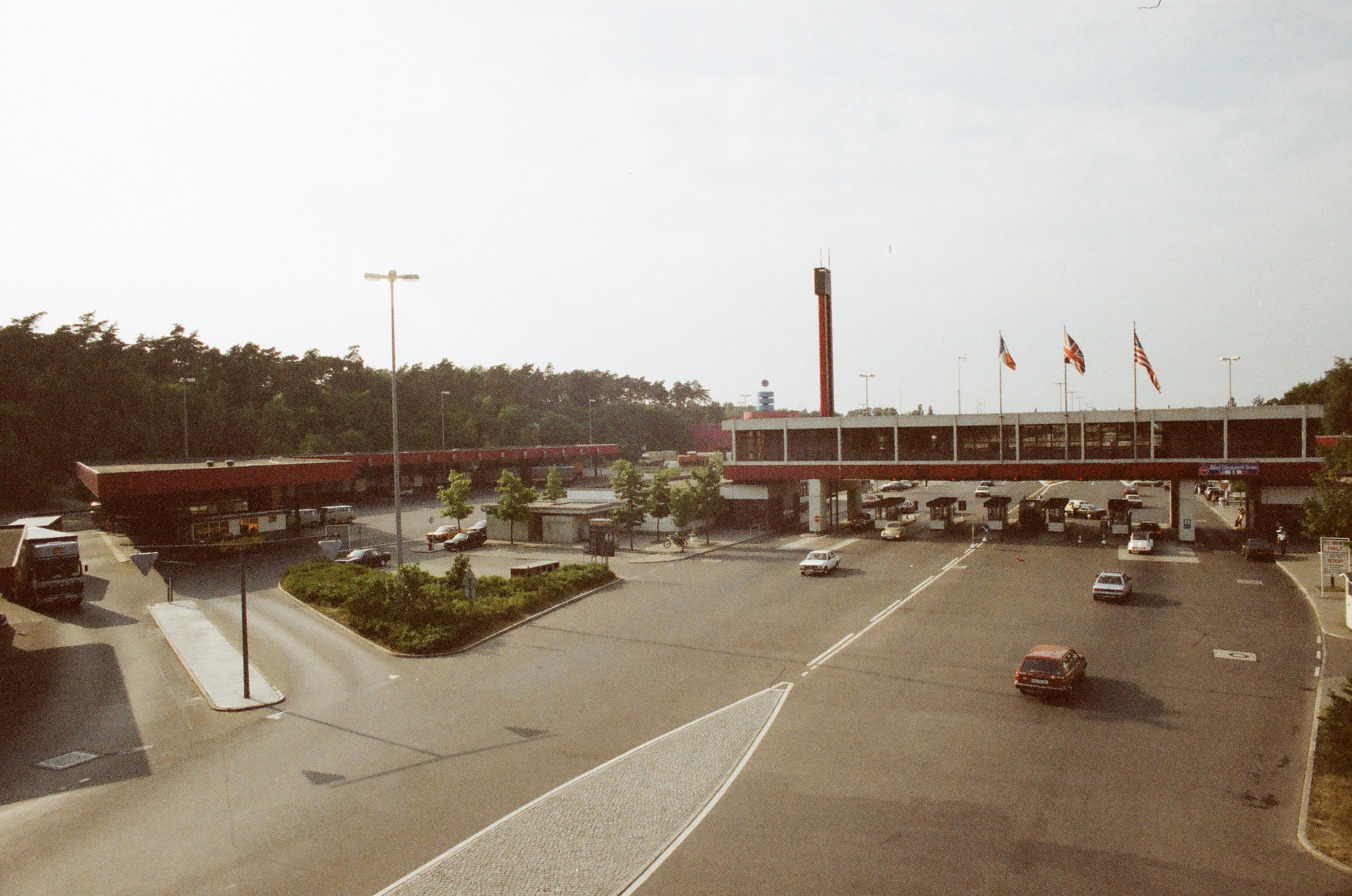
Checkpoint Bravo seen in 1987

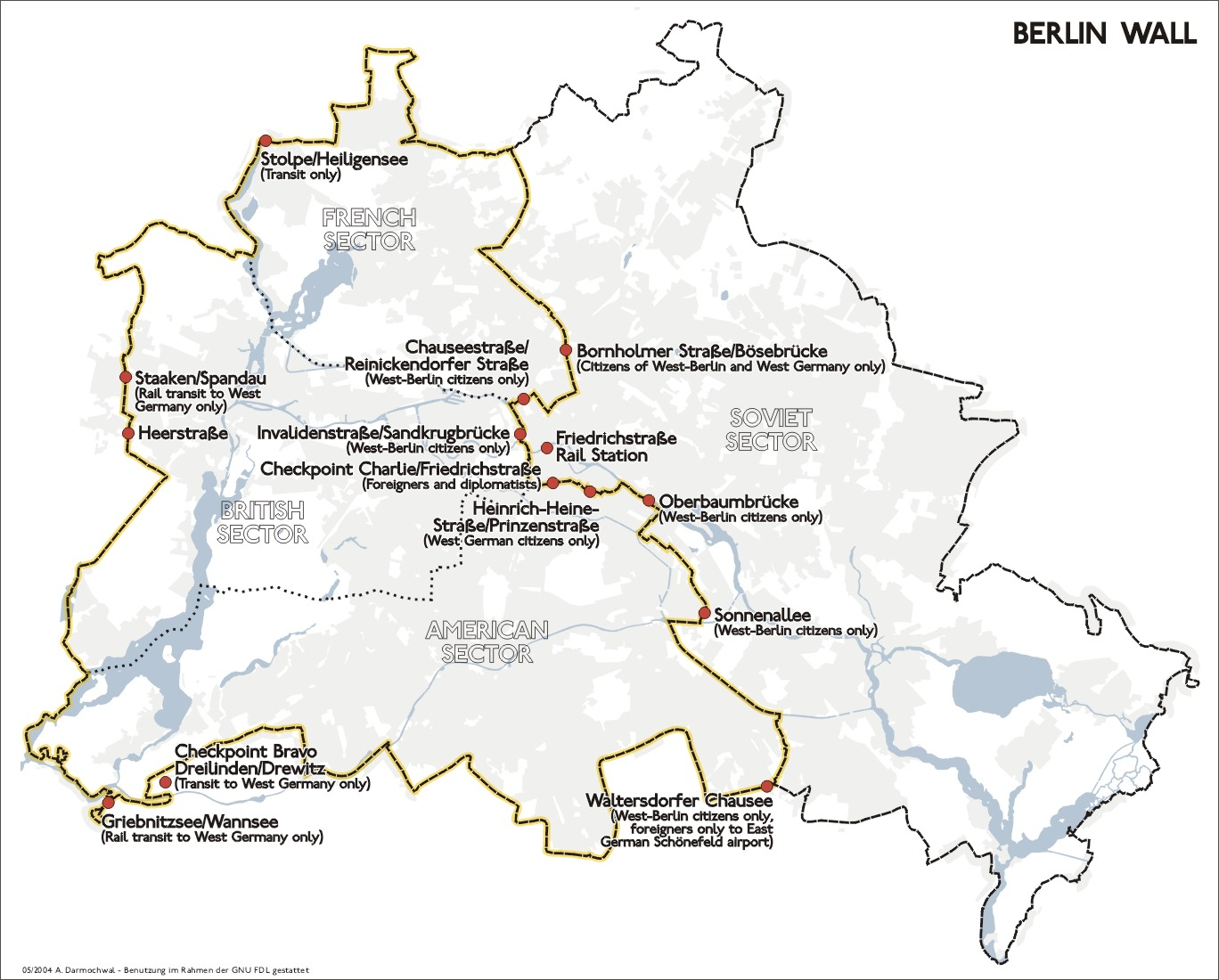
Map showing the Berlin border and its crossing points

Checkpoint Bravo ("Checkpoint B") was the name given by the Western Allies to the main Autobahn border crossing point between West Berlin and the German Democratic Republic. It was known in German as Grenzübergangsstelle Drewitz-Dreilinden. Drewitz is a community nearby, and Dreilinden is the name of the wooded area in Berlin through which the highway passes.

== Geography ==
The checkpoint was located on the A 115 motorway (known within Berlin as the AVUS), between the Berliner locality of Nikolassee and the Brandenburger rural community of Drewitz, part of the municipality of Kleinmachnow.

== History ==
The checkpoint was the nearest motorway border crossing point to the Helmstedt–Marienborn border crossing ("Checkpoint Alpha") on the border of West Germany, making it part of the shortest highway transit route between West Germany and West Berlin.

The checkpoint was shifted slightly during 1969 from Drewitz (part of Potsdam), after the East German authorities realigned the transit route to eliminate a brief re-entry into GDR territory before transit traffic could finally enter West Berlin. The new checkpoint was relocated to Nikolassee (part of the district of Zehlendorf).

== Since annexation of DDR ==
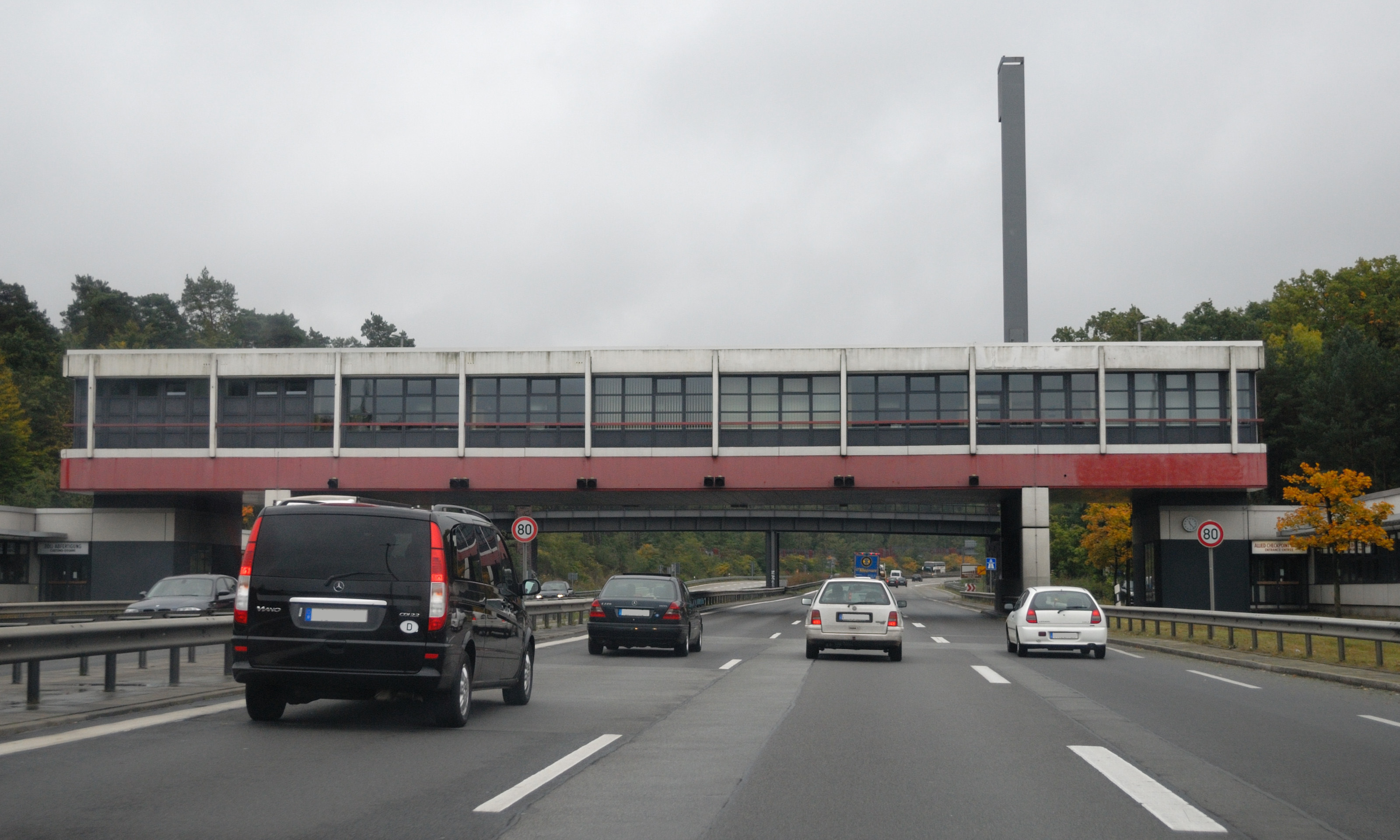
Bridge building of former Checkpoint Bravo that housed the offices of the military police

The site of the original, pre-1969 checkpoint (rest stop, adjacent car park and abandoned highway) was used in filming the Alarm for Cobra 11 television series. The site itself, "which includes a derelict bridge and a crumbling cafe covered in graffiti," was auctioned in September 2010 for €45,000.

The vast site of the East-German checkpoint was eventually converted into a commercial park named Europarc Dreilinden (in German). All that remains of the checkpoint is the former main control tower that now houses a museum of the checkpoint.

== Gallery ==
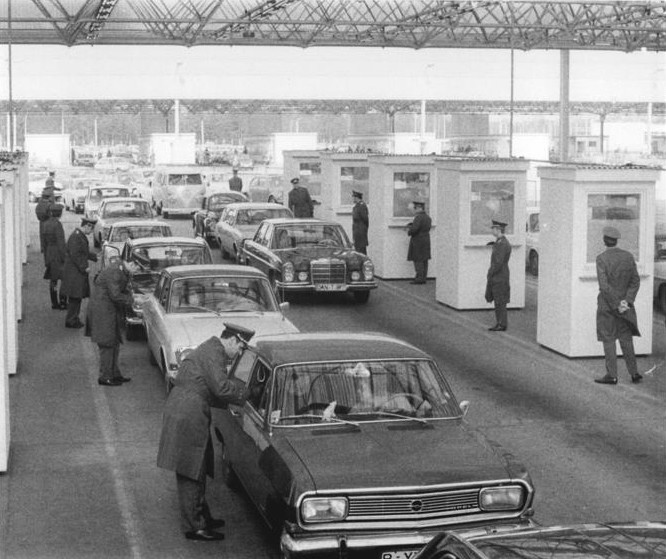
Congestion at the East German checkpoint in Drewitz in March 1972 after the temporary easing of travel restrictions into East Germany

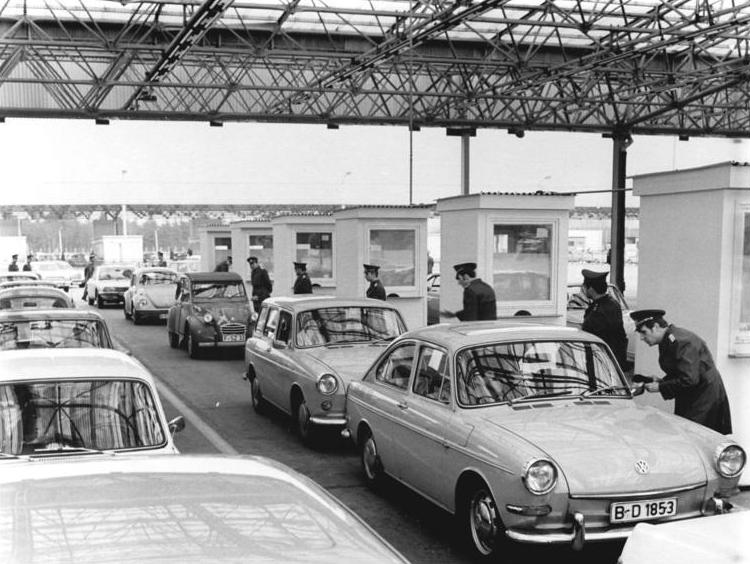
Congestion at the East German checkpoint in Drewitz in March 1972 after the temporary easing of travel restrictions into East Germany

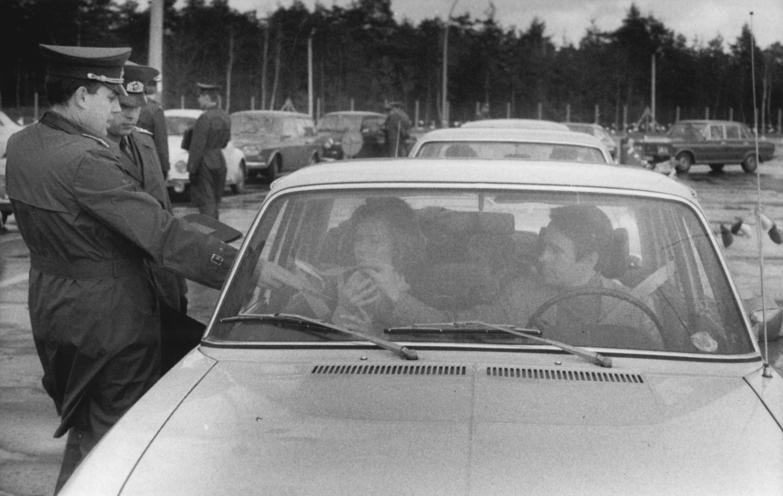
East German border guards checking vehicles at the checkpoint in Drewitz in March 1972 after the easing of travel restrictions into East Germany

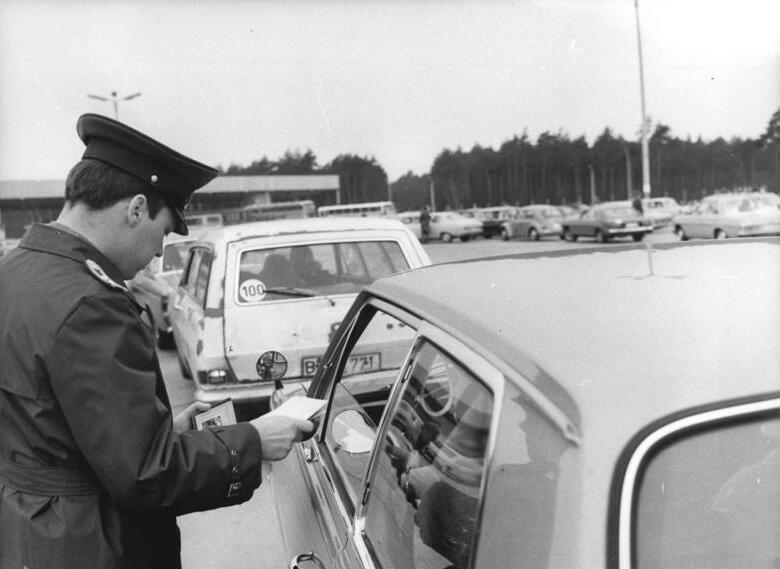
East German border guards checking vehicles at the checkpoint in Drewitz in March 1972 after the easing of travel restrictions into East Germany

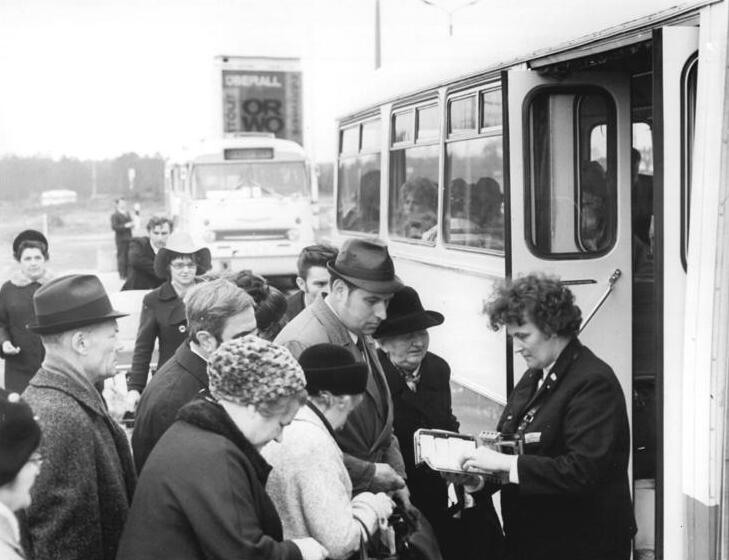
West Berlin passengers board buses to travel in East Germany at the Drewitz checkpoint in March 1972 after the temporary easing of travel restrictions into East Germany.

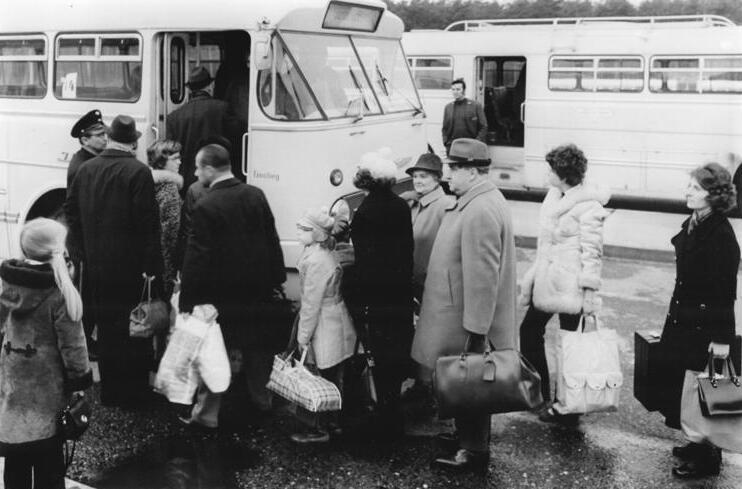
West Berlin passengers board buses to travel in East Germany at the Drewitz checkpoint in March 1972 after the temporary easing of travel restrictions into East Germany.

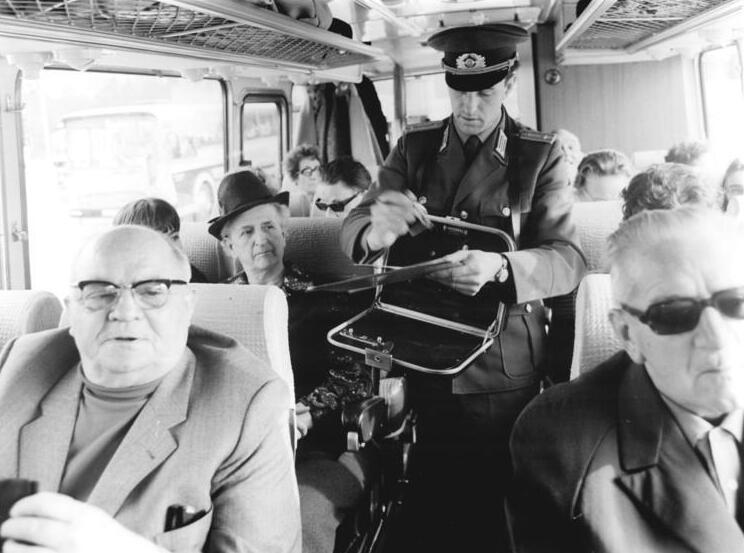
East German border guards check passes of West Berlin passengers in March 1972 after the temporary easing of travel restrictions into East Germany.

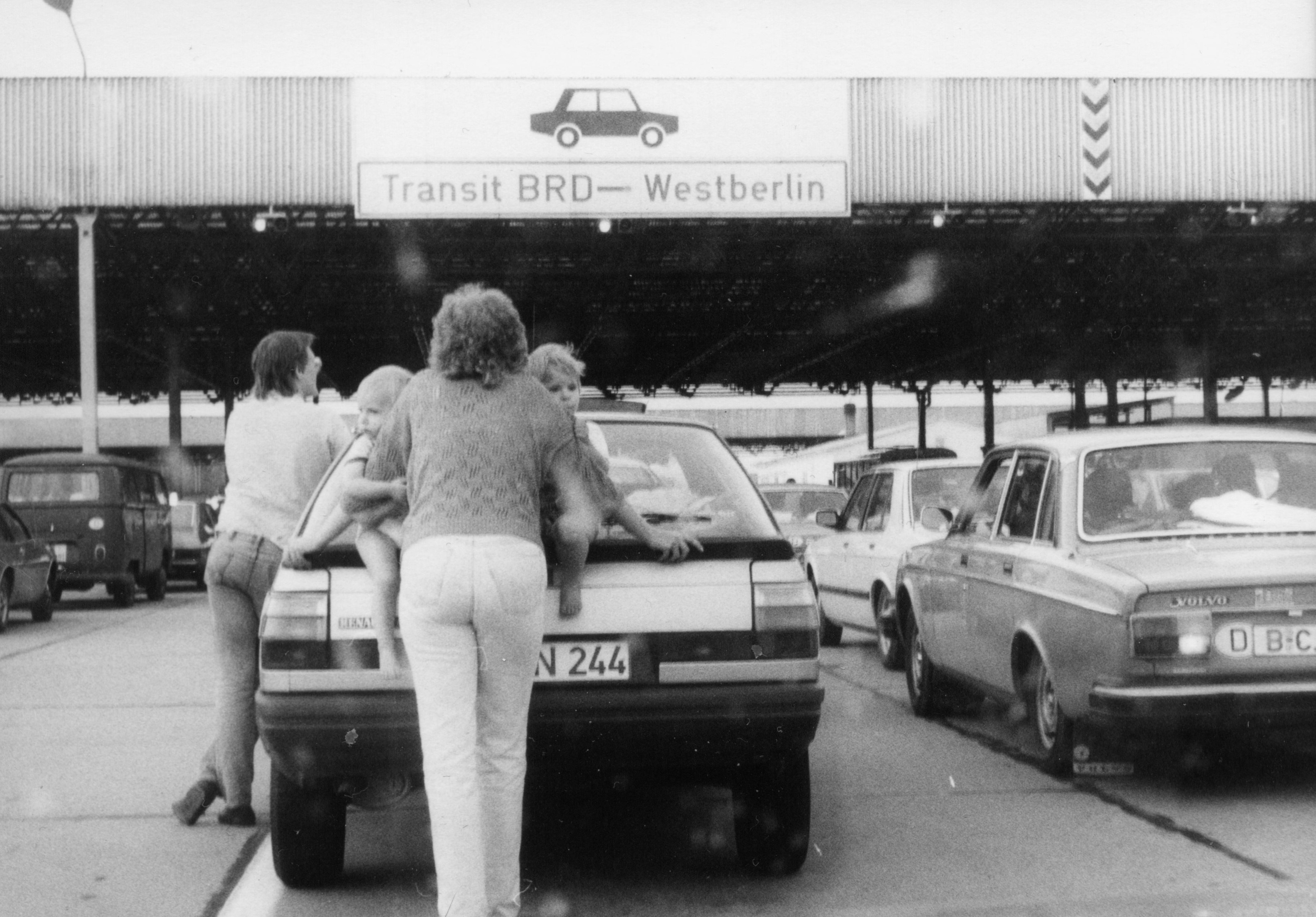
Transit traffic from West Germany waiting to enter West Berlin at the East German checkpoint at Drewitz in 1986. Drivers and passengers would push their cars to save fuel.

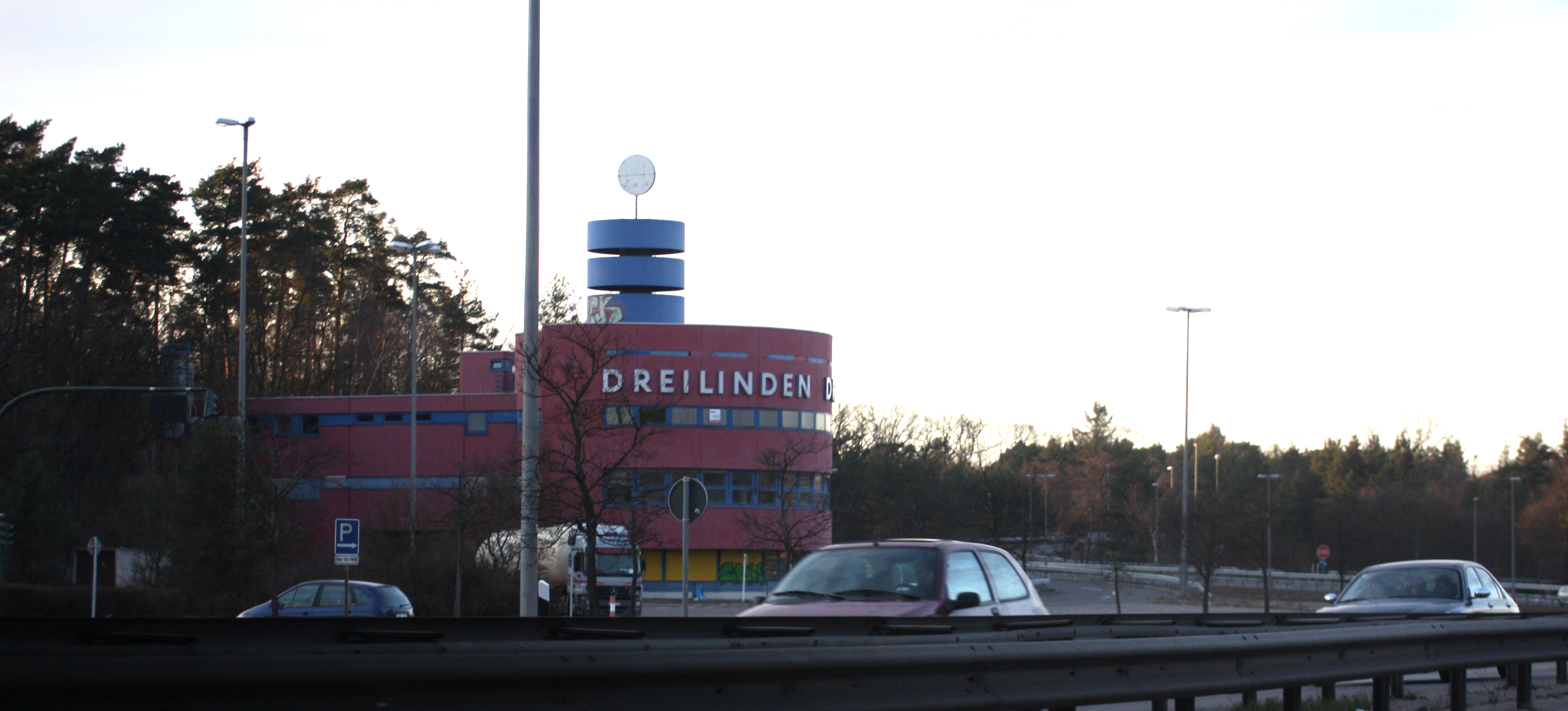
Former checkpoint in 2009

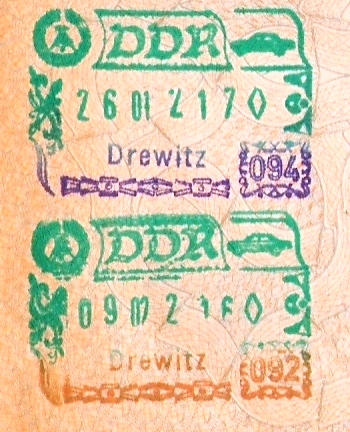
Passport stamps from the Drewitz checkpoint

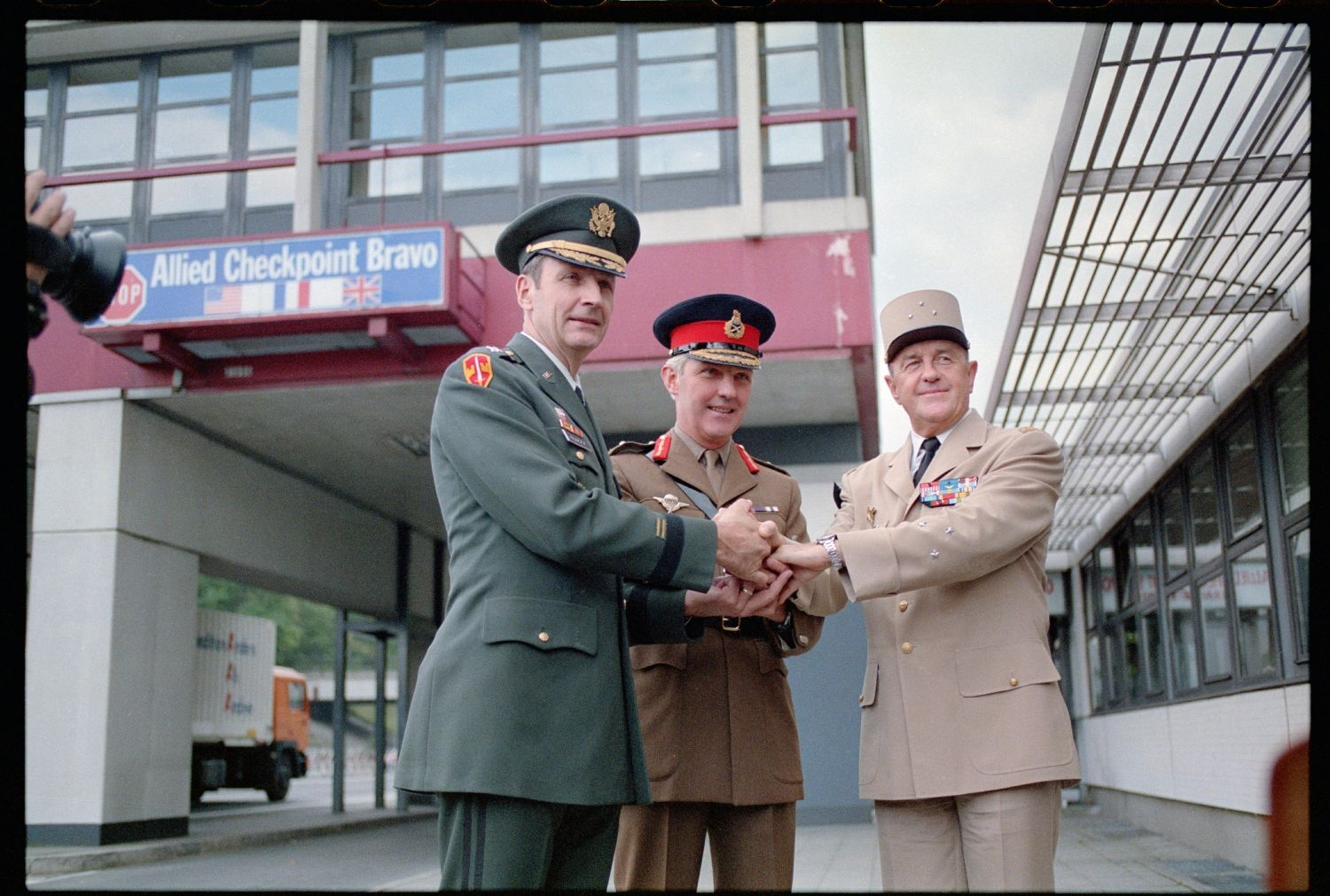
Withdrawal of Allied forces from Berlin, official act to close Allied Checkpoint Bravo in Berlin-Zehlendorf, Allied checkpoint on the transit route between West Berlin and the Federal Republic of Germany: US City Commandant Major General Raymond E. Haddock, Major General Robert Corbett, British City Commandant, and Général de Division François Cann, French City Commandant (from left)

== See also ==
- Berlin border crossings
- Helmstedt–Marienborn border crossing (Checkpoint Alpha)
- Checkpoint Charlie
