= Checkpoint Charlie Museum =

Private museum in Berlin, Germany

Coordinates: 52°30′28″N 13°23′26″E

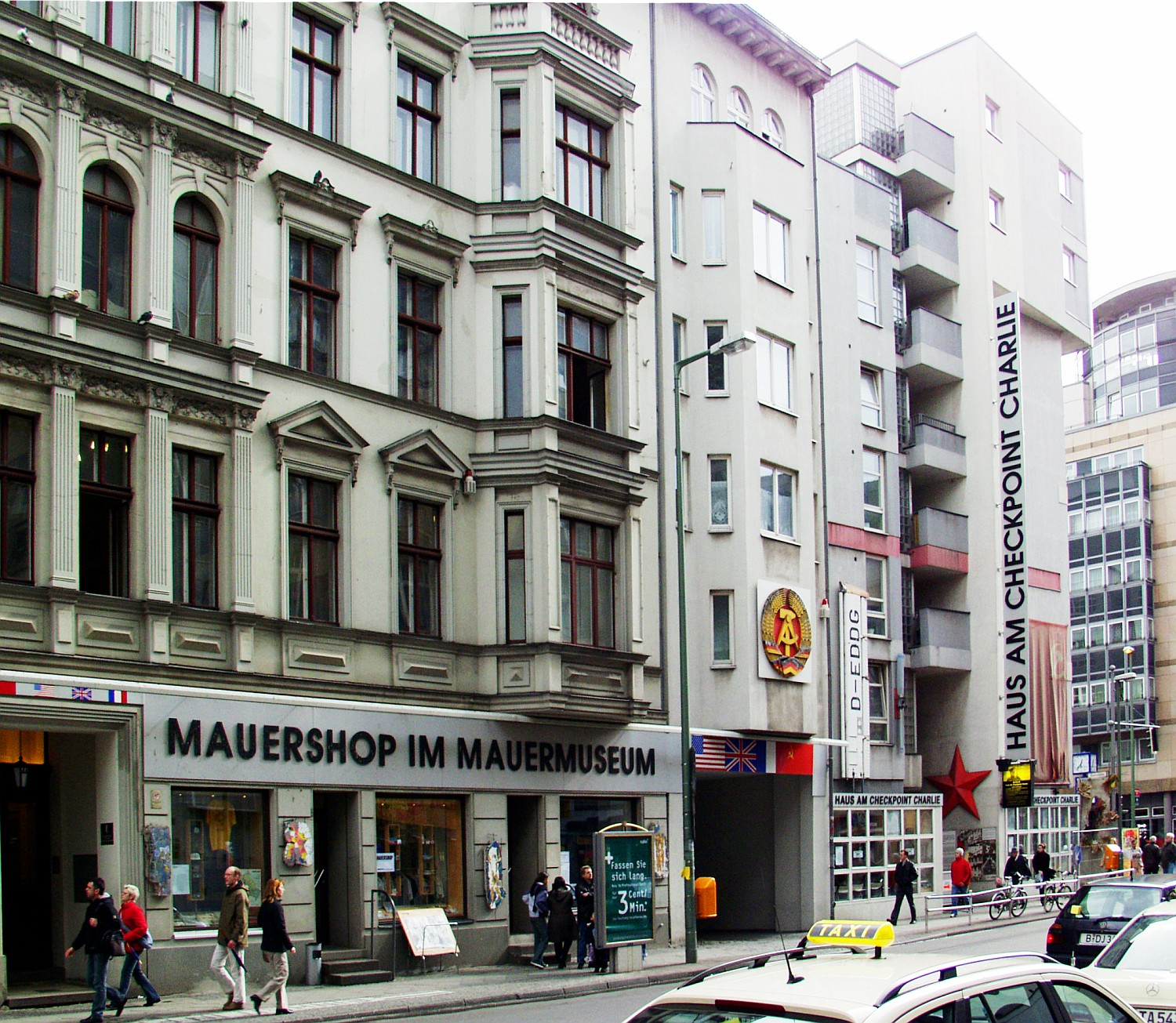
Haus am Checkpoint Charlie

Checkpoint Charlie Museum, Berlin

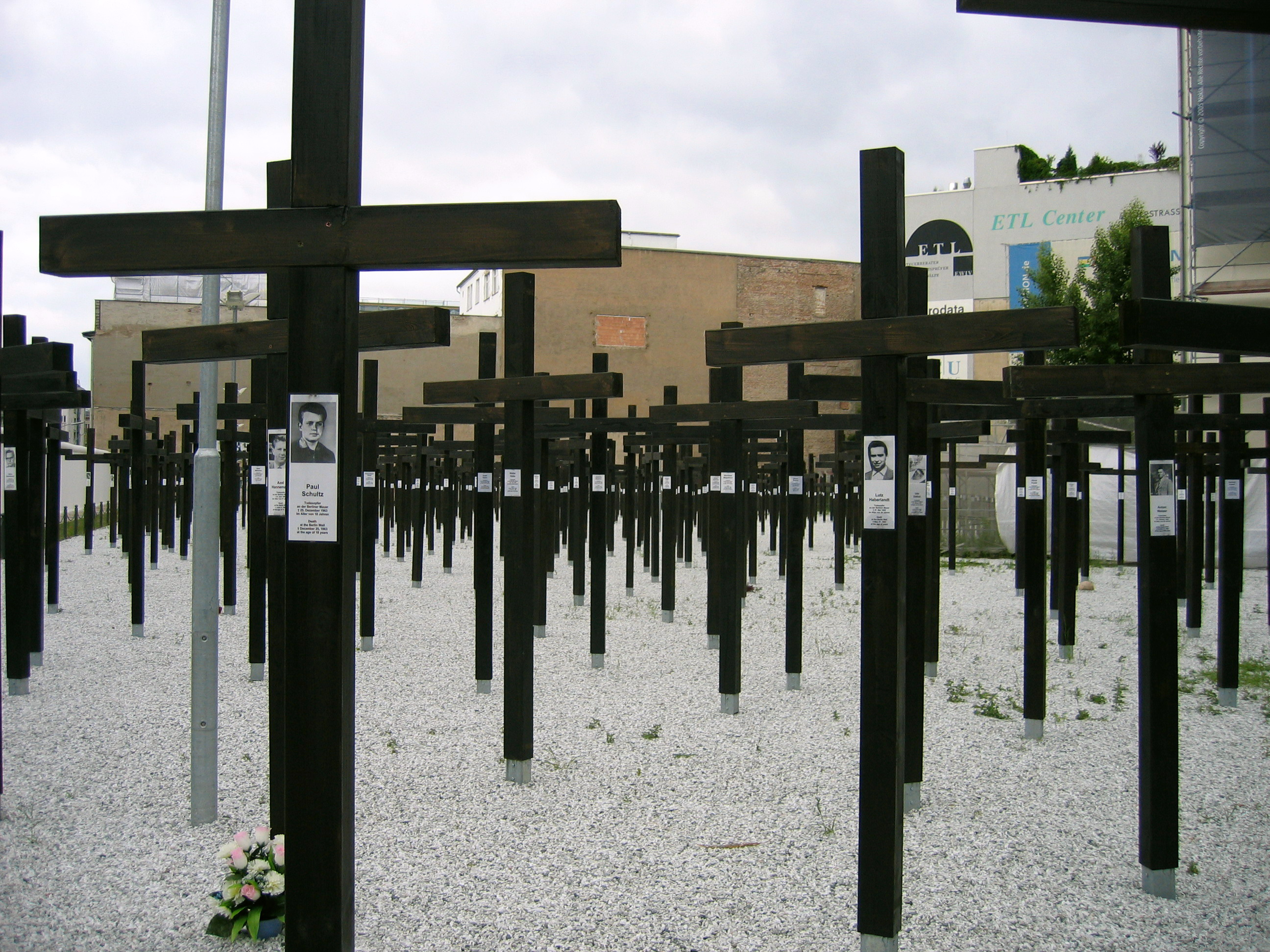
The Freedom Memorial

The Wall Museum – Museum Haus am Checkpoint Charlie (German: Mauermuseum – Museum Haus am Checkpoint Charlie) is a private museum in Berlin. It is named after the famous crossing point through the Berlin Wall, and was created to document the so-called "best border security system in the world" (in the words of East German general Heinz Hoffmann). On display are the photos and related documents of successful escape attempts from East Germany, together with the escape apparatus: hot-air balloons, getaway cars, chairlifts, and a mini-U-boat. The museum researches and maintains a list of deaths at the Berlin Wall. It is operated by the Mauermuseum-Betriebs gGmbH, and the director is Alexandra Hildebrandt.

== History ==
The Arbeitsgemeinschaft 13. August is an association named after the date the Berlin Wall was constructed. It was formed with the purpose to fight against human rights violations as a result of the wall, and to create solutions through activities such as press conferences, publishing, and exhibitions. The museum project began as an exhibition by founding director and human rights activist Rainer Hildebrandt. According to Hildebrandt: "The first exhibition opened on the 19 October 1962 in an apartment with only two and a half rooms in famous Bernauer Straße. The street was divided along its whole length; the buildings in the east had been vacated and their windows were bricked up. We suggested that tourists be thankful to those border guards who do not shoot to kill".

On 14 June 1963, the museum opened in its permanent location on Friedrichstraße, known as Haus am Checkpoint Charlie. The Arbeitsgemeinschaft 13. August e. V. was formally registered with the city as a Verein (association) on 16 July 1963. The museum in its early days was known for its jumbled and chaotic exhibition style, with many objects and relics displayed without the usual organization of a conventional museum. It was also a political center, and actively involved in planning and assisting escapes. It featured a library, films, lectures, and a publishing operation.

After the fall of the Berlin Wall, and the corresponding considerable reduction in its public grant money, under the leadership of Alexandra Hildebrandt the museum evolved into a private undertaking, which "reinvented the former political center as a 'place of experience.'" It operated, in the words of Hildebrandt, "according to business principles", soon earning seven-digit profits and becoming the most commercially successful museum in Europe. In 2002, the Arbeitsgemeinschaft 13. August gave up its charitable status and thus its remaining grants and tax breaks.

It is now one of the most frequently visited museums in Berlin, with more than 850,000 visitors annually. In recent years, the museum has continued to add to its exhibitions on the international struggle for human rights, bringing attention to the cases of Sergei Magnitsky and others.

In 2004, Alexandra Hildebrandt installed the Freedom Memorial to the victims of the border forces, in a nearby empty lot. The memorial was removed the following year, after the lease on the land was terminated by the owner. Both the memorial and its removal were the subjects of some criticism and controversy.

== Main exhibitions ==
- The wall from 13 August 1961 to its fall is an exhibition of photographs, writing, and objects, documenting the Berlin Wall and escapes across it, during the time it stood.
- The Berlin from front-line city to bridge of Europe exhibition shows the history of divided Berlin, following World War II to its reunification.
- In the It happened at Checkpoint Charlie exhibition the many historical events that took place at Checkpoint Charlie are presented.
- The Inventive Escapes exhibition focuses on various contraptions and ingenious vehicles, used to successfully evade the East German border security.

== Further exhibitions and events ==
- From Gandhi to Walesa Non-violent struggle for human rights exhibition portrays non-violent protests around the world, and how similar methods were used in Germany.
- NATO Mission for Freedom is a new permanent exhibition focusing on international and diplomatic contexts opened in March, 2012. NATO General Secretary Anders F. Rasmussen visited the exhibition in May, 2012.
- The Ronald Reagan exhibition is a celebration of President Reagan's life and work, and his contribution to the tearing down of the Berlin Wall.
- Raoul Wallenberg lives is a new permanent exhibition on the life and work of Raoul Wallenberg that opened in 2012.
- Mikhail Khodorkovsky exhibition: Mikhail Khodorkovsky held a press conference upon his release in December 2013 at the museum. He gave thanks to the media, former German foreign minister Hans-Dietrich Genscher, and German chancellor Angela Merkel for their assistance in securing his release. He expressed gratitude to the museum for hosting the press conference and for providing moral support in relation to its exhibition section about his situation, while he was imprisoned. According to museum director Alexandra Hildebrandt, it was she who in 2011 encouraged Genscher to become involved in the diplomatic efforts to release Khodorkovsky.
- Nadiya Savchenko exhibition: The museum installed an exhibition of the works of Nadiya Savchenko in 2016, and helped in the efforts to secure her release from prison.

== Quotation ==
We can also call ourselves the first museum of international nonviolent protest. Our exhibits include: The Charta 77 typewriter, the hectograph of the illegal periodical "Umweltblätter" ("Environmental Pages"), Mahatma Gandhi's diary and sandals and from Elena Bonner the death mask of her partner Andrei Sakharov.

— Rainer Hildebrandt, "Origins - Development - Future", from mauermuseum.de
