= Helmstedt–Marienborn border crossing =

Defunct border checkpoint at the Inner German border

Coordinates: 52.215514°N 11.081044°E

Helmstedt–Marienborn border crossing within Germany

The Helmstedt–Marienborn border crossing (German: Grenzübergang Helmstedt-Marienborn), named Grenzübergangsstelle Marienborn (GÜSt) (border crossing Marienborn) by the German Democratic Republic (GDR), was the largest and most important border crossing on the Inner German border during the division of Germany. Due to its geographical location, allowing for the shortest land route between West Germany and West Berlin, most transit traffic to and from West Berlin used the Helmstedt-Marienborn crossing. Most travel routes from West Germany to East Germany and Poland also used this crossing. The border crossing existed from 1945 to 1990 and was situated near the East German village of Marienborn at the edge of the Lappwald. The crossing interrupted the Bundesautobahn 2 (A 2) between the junctions Helmstedt-Ost and Ostingersleben.

== History ==
=== First checkpoints ===
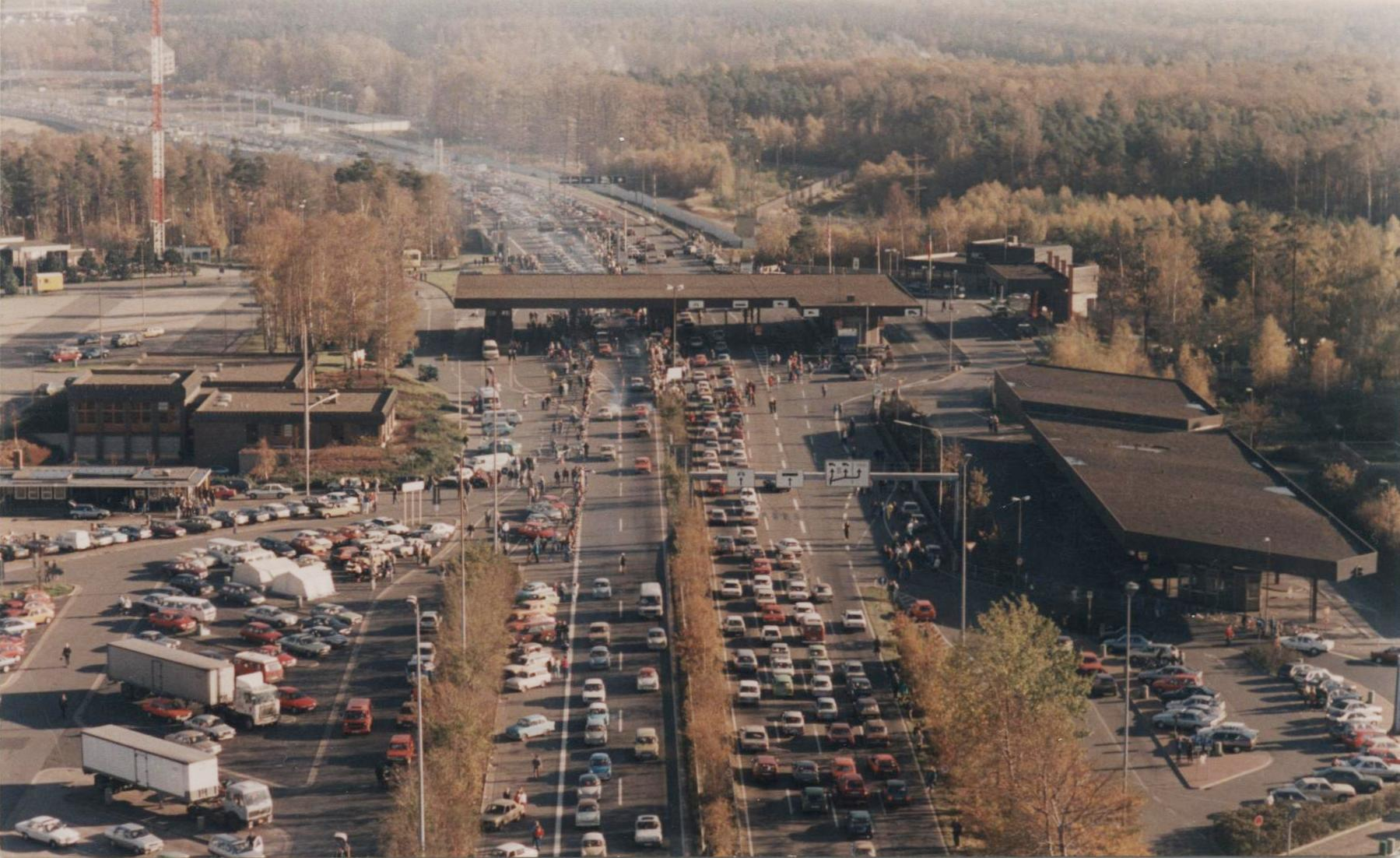
West German checkpoint in November 1989

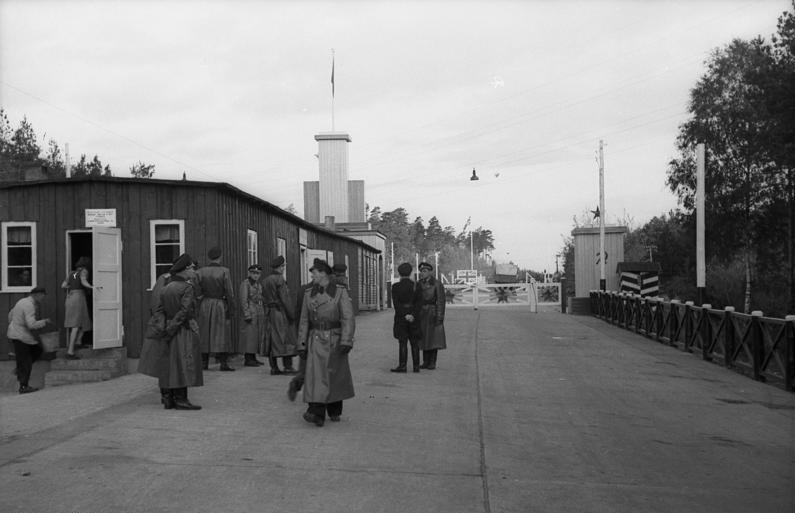
Helmstedt–Marienborn from the Soviet Occupation Zone in 1949

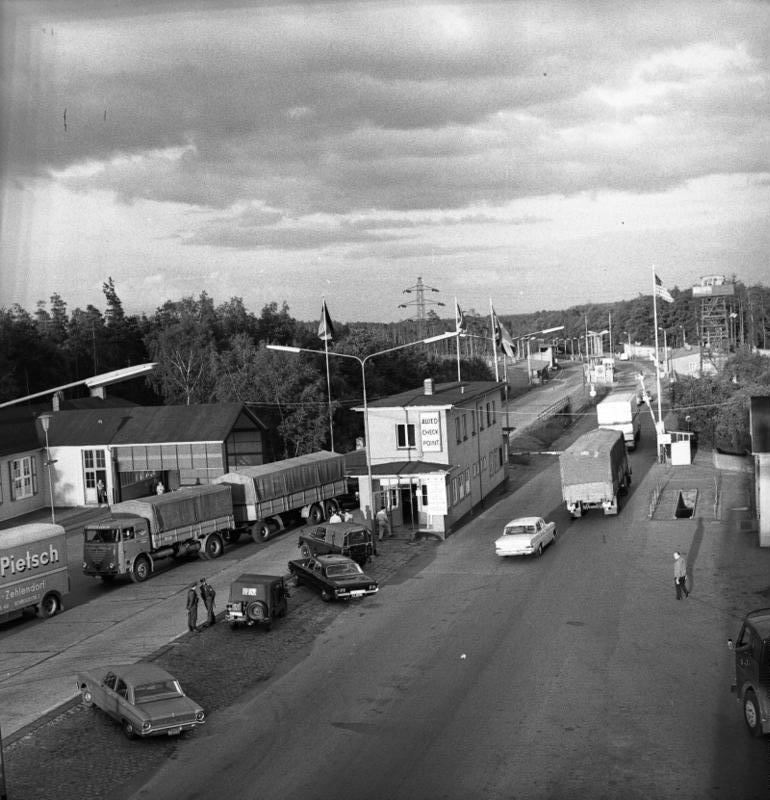
Looking down on Helmstedt–Marienborn from the West German side in 1967

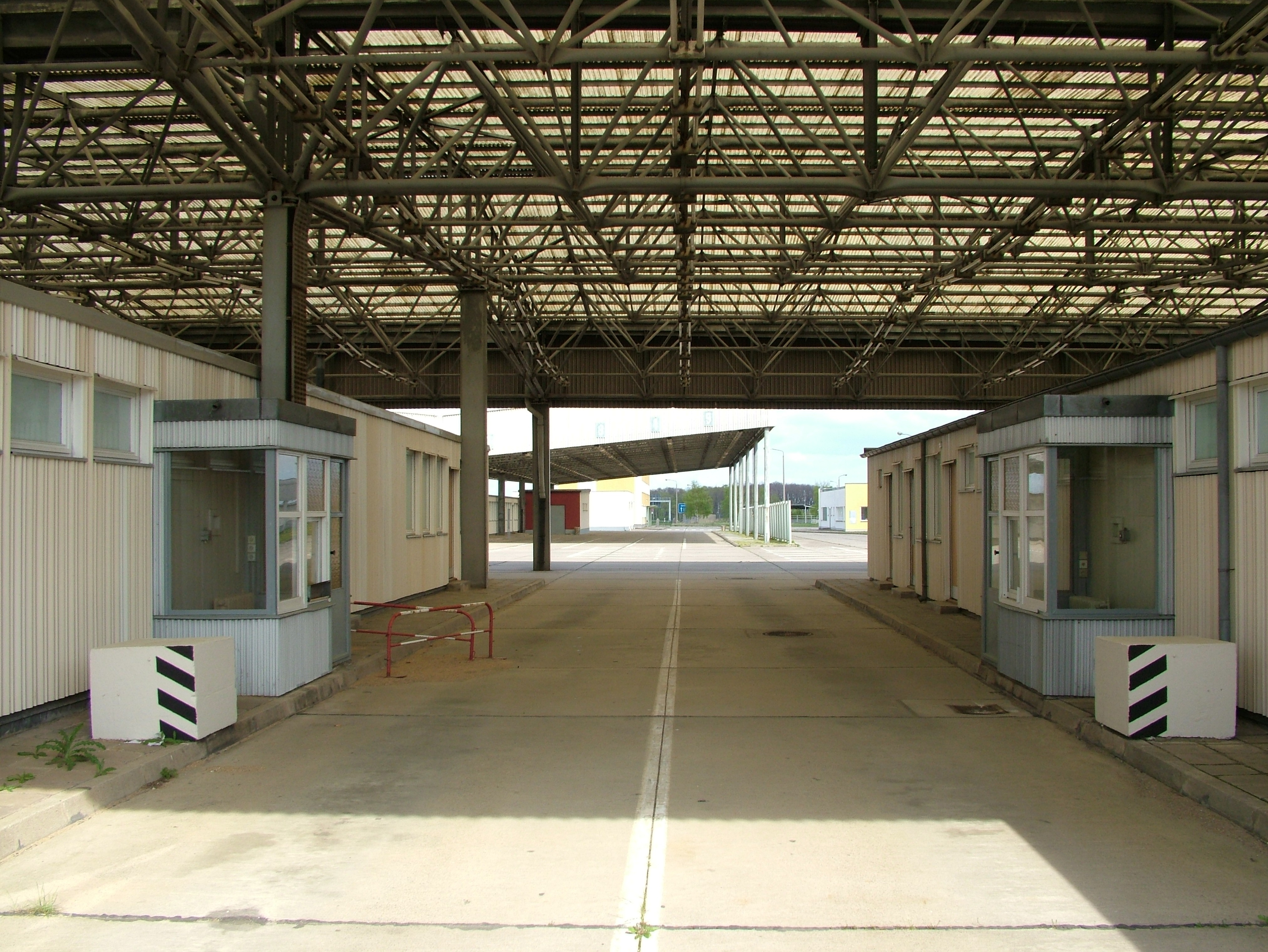
Former control point, passport control booths at GDR immigration

A checkpoint was established on the site on 1 July 1945, which was on the demarcation line between the British and Soviet occupation zones. Its scope included the interzonal railway traffic as well as the motor vehicle traffic on the Reichsautobahn between Hanover and Berlin. The checkpoint buildings were located directly on the zones' border, and consisted of little more than temporary wooden buildings.

The most important inner-German checkpoint, the Autobahn crossing at Helmstedt was named Alpha by the Western Allies. Its counterpart in the Berlin southern borough of Dreilinden was named Bravo. The connection between these checkpoints gained its importance from being the shortest connection between the western zones and Berlin, at 170 km (110 miles). During the Berlin Blockade, which endured from June 1948 to May 1949, the Soviet checkpoint was closed.

The border was initially manned by the Royal Military Police and the Group of Soviet Occupation Forces In Germany. From 1950 onwards, the East German Grenzpolizei (later the Grenztruppen der DDR) performed the border control on the eastern side of the checkpoint while the Soviet Army escorted NATO military traffic to and from West Berlin. Due to the increasing tensions between the Western Allies and the Soviet Union during the Cold War, the border crossing was expanded extensively and security was increased during the following years. However, the original checkpoint was eventually regarded too unsafe to operate efficiently.

=== Expansion in the 1970s ===
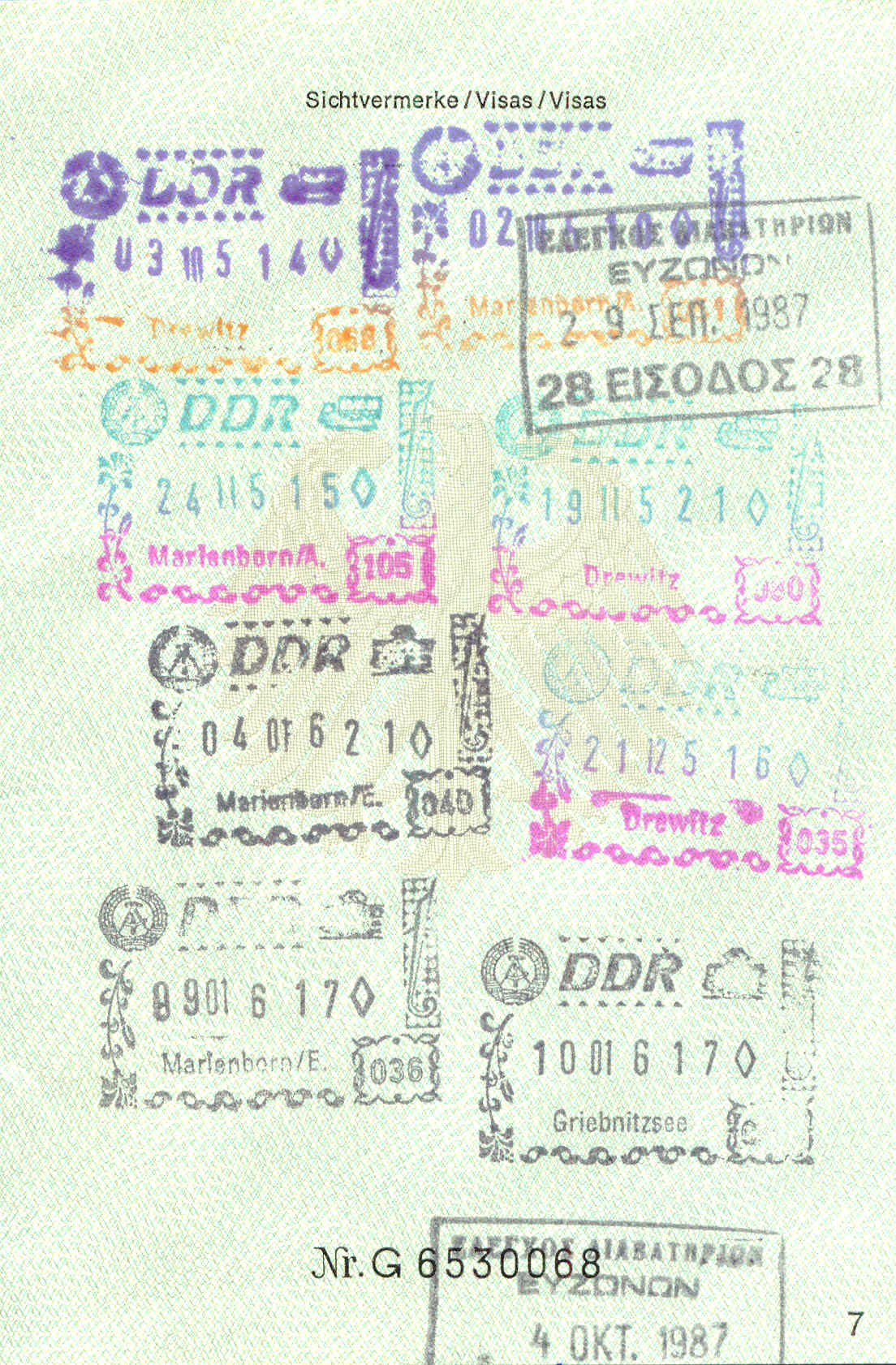
East German stamps in a West German passport

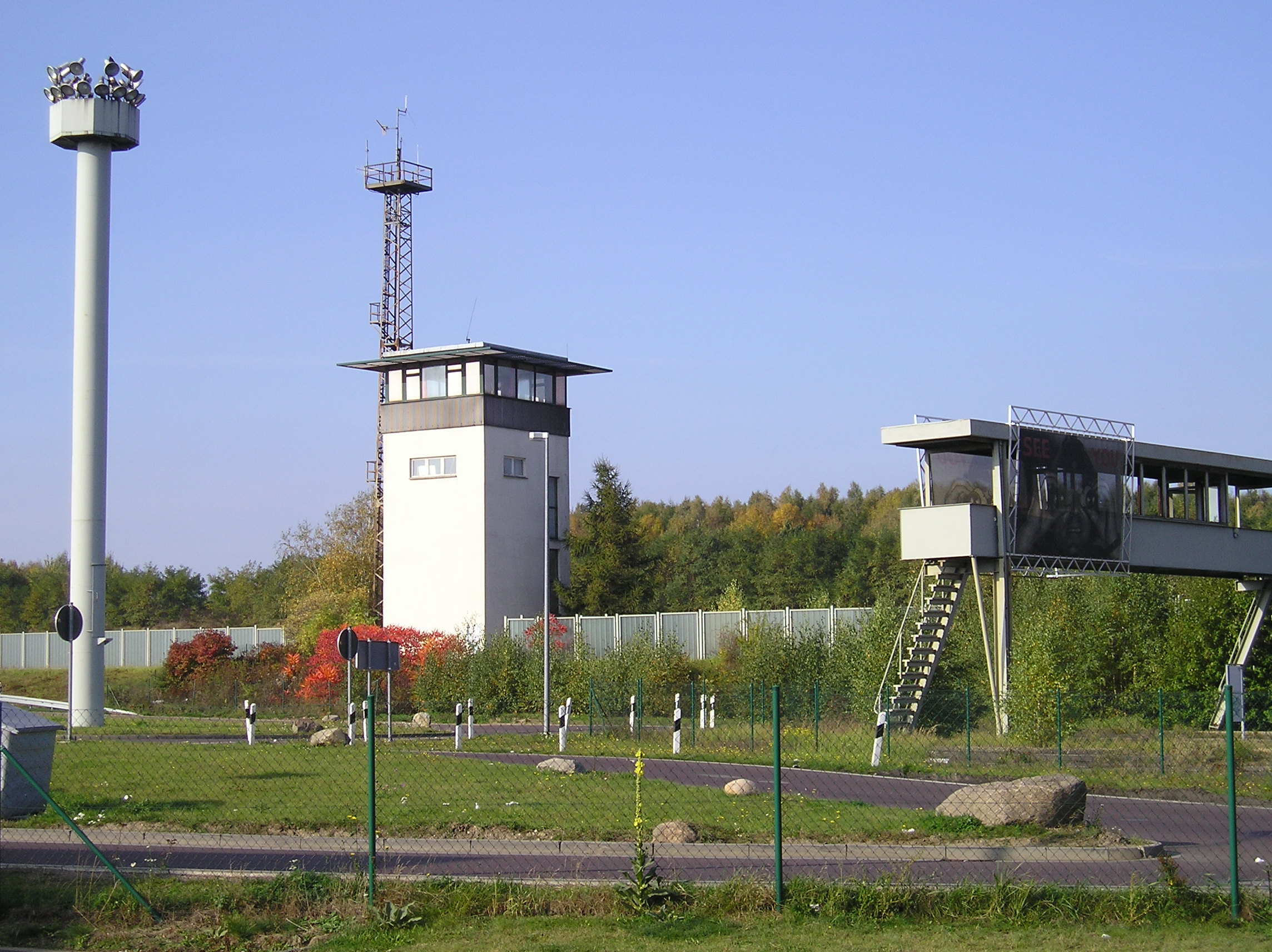
Command buildings

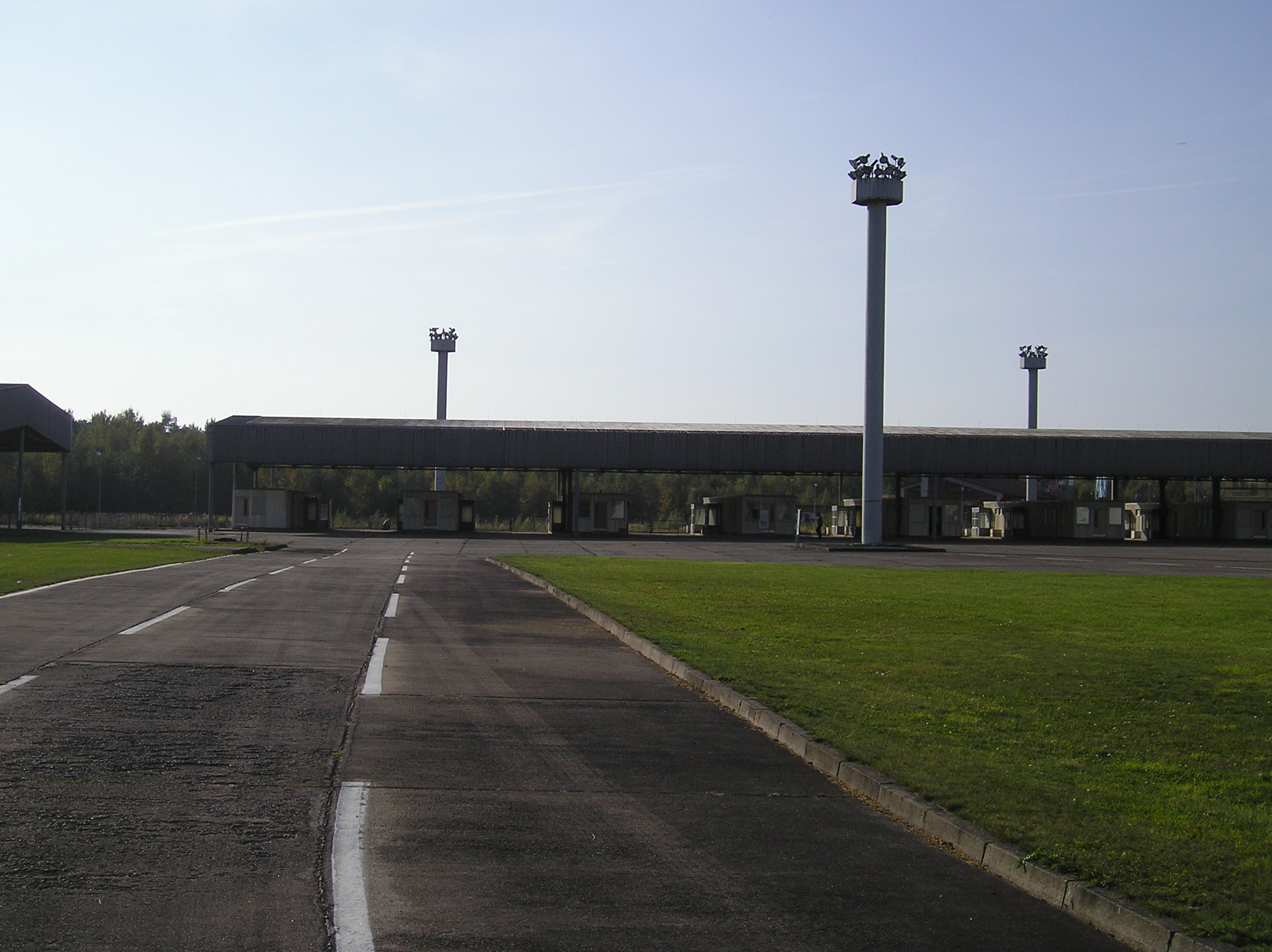
Passport control

Between 1972 and 1974, the GDR erected a new control portal on a 35-hectare (86-acre) field situated on a hill near Marienborn, about 1.5 km (1,600 yards) east of the border. The control portal was staffed with as many as 1,000 passport control, customs, and border police employees. The buildings were linked with a tunnel system, through which military or police units could reach the control portal quickly and secretly.

The Western Allies kept control of their checkpoint on the western side, with small garrisons of French, British and American troops stationed in Helmstedt. The West German Bundesgrenzschutz had assumed control of the operative controls on the western side of the border crossing, where the buildings were notably smaller compared with Marienborn.

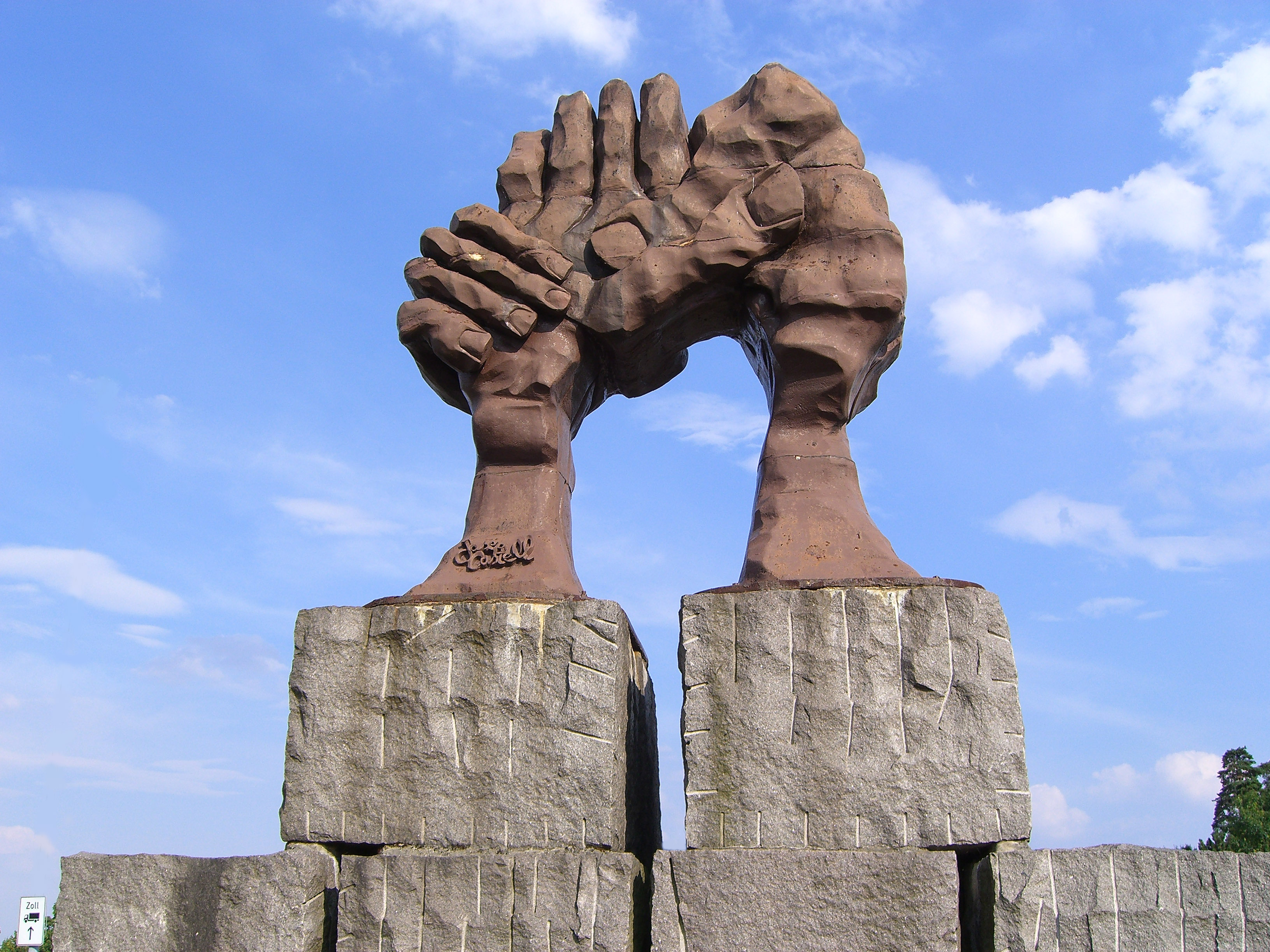
Die Wölbung der Hände, a memorial on the former West German side

The restrictive East German controls and the ever-increasing amount of traffic soon resulted in notable waiting times on the West German side. Therefore, the West German government added extensive car parks and rest areas on the autobahn approach to Helmstedt.

Border controls were relaxed after the Wende during late 1989. The crossing was dismantled at midnight on June 30, 1990, exactly 45 years after its first opening. The former GDR buildings have been a listed building since October 1990, however the former GDR departures area was demolished when the A 2 road was expanded to six lanes. A rest stop with a motel has now been built on part of the old GDR control portal's area.

== Checkpoint Alpha ==
The Helmstedt-Marienborn checkpoint was one of three checkpoints used by the Western Allies. Its western side (in the former British zone) was labeled Checkpoint Alpha, after the first letter of the NATO phonetic alphabet. The Allied side of the checkpoint for entry into West Berlin was named Checkpoint Bravo, and Checkpoint Charlie was the Allied checkpoint for entry into (and exit from) East Berlin.

The nomenclature of "checkpoint", as opposed to the East German "Grenzübergangsstelle" (which literally means "border-crossing-place") was a result of the Western Allies not recognising the legitimacy of East Germany as a state. That changed in 1973, when the GDR was admitted to the United Nations, but the term remained in use.

== Division memorial ==
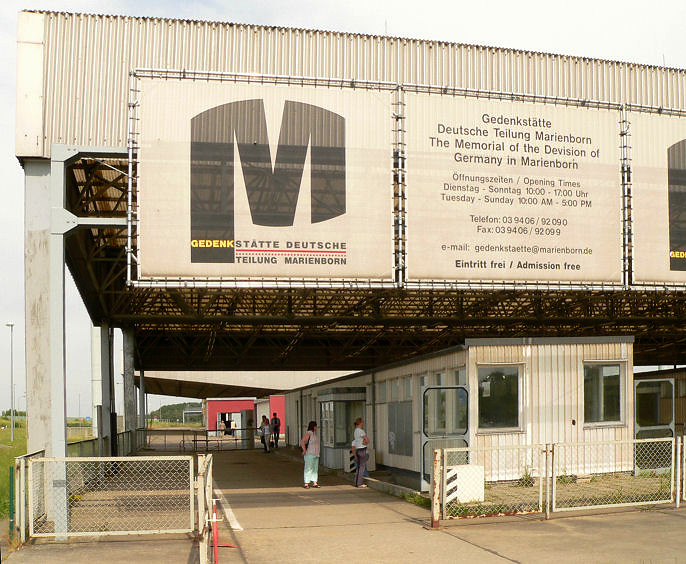
Entrance of the memorial site

On the grounds of the former East German border control buildings, the "Gedenkstätte Deutsche Teilung Marienborn" was opened on August 13, 1996. The memorial is operated by the state of Saxony-Anhalt and features exhibitions and guided tours. The West German buildings near Helmstedt have either been demolished or are now used for other purposes.

The memorial site is accessible via the nearby rest stop's exit and can only be explored on foot. The site is touched by Eurovelo-Route EV13 Iron Curtain Trail which follows the former border. Its a Cultural Route of the Council of Europe since 2019 and connects many more Iron Curtain memorials through Europe.

== Films ==
- Halt! Hier Grenze - Auf den Spuren der innerdeutschen Grenze, Documentary, Germany 2005
- In the 1983 film The Day After, NATO forces cross the border in an attempt to break a Soviet military buildup in East Germany. The attack backfires, resulting in a Soviet invasion of West Germany, and eventually culminating in a full-scale nuclear war between NATO and the Warsaw Pact.

== See also ==
- Checkpoint Bravo
- Checkpoint Charlie
