= Freedom Memorial =

Berlin Wall memorial in Germany

- Freiheitsmahnmal
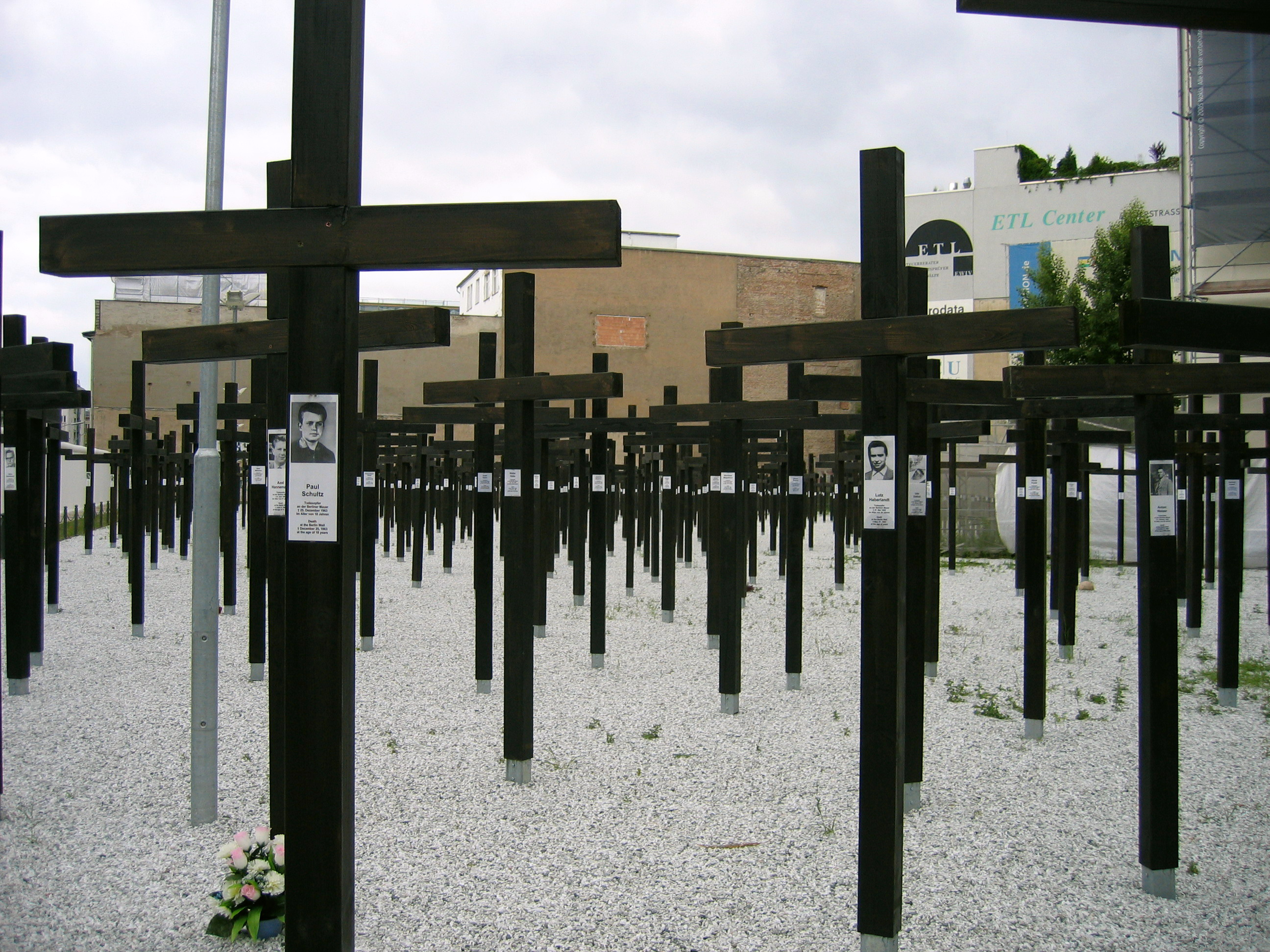
- The Freedom Memorial in June 2005
- Interactive map of Freedom Memorial
- Location: Berlin, Germany
- Coordinates: 52°30′28″N 13°23′26″E

The Freedom Memorial (German: Freiheitsmahnmal) was a memorial to the victims of the Berlin Wall in the vicinity of the Checkpoint Charlie Museum in Berlin. It opened on October 31, 2004, and was praised by both victims of the GDR communist regime and human rights advocates alike.

== Memorial ==
In 2004, Alexandra Hildebrandt leased an empty lot near the site of the former Checkpoint Charlie, and installed the Freedom Memorial to the victims of the border forces. While welcomed by many, it was criticized by Berlin officials as being historically and symbolically inaccurate, and for being erected by a private individual without a public process. The following year, the lease was terminated by the land owner, a bank. Hildebrand refused to clear out the monument, and the crosses which made up the memorial were removed by bailiffs following a court order.
