= Alexandra Hildebrandt =

German museum director

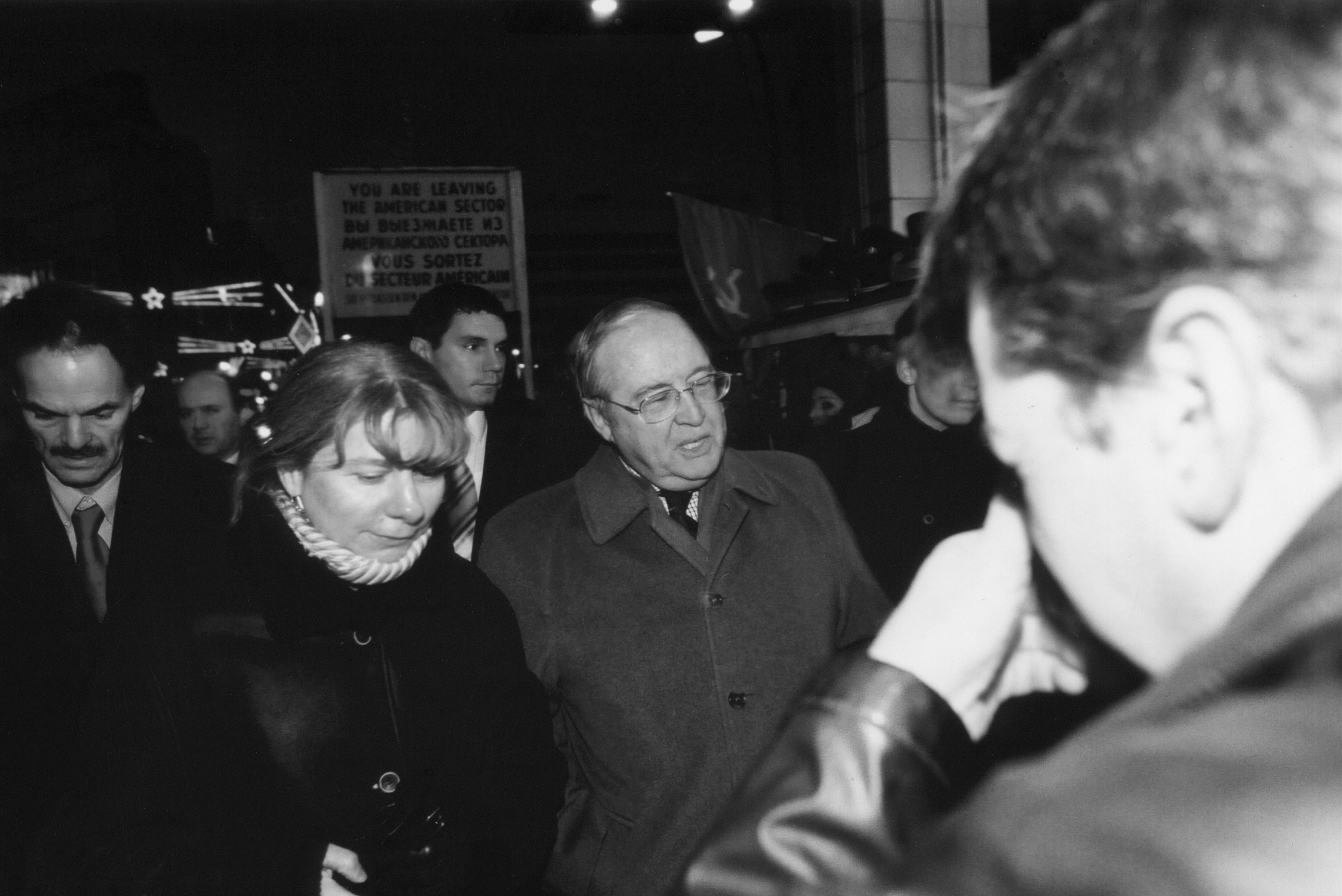
- US ambassador William Timken and Alexandra Hildebrandt at Checkpoint Charlie
- Born: Alexandra Weissmann; 27 February 1959 (age 67); Kyiv, Ukraine, USSR
- Occupations: Director of the Checkpoint Charlie Museum human rights activist
- Spouse(s): Rainer Hildebrandt; Daniel Dormann

Alexandra Hildebrandt (née Weissmann, born on 27 February 1959) is a German human rights activist and museum director of the Checkpoint Charlie Museum. In 1995, she married the museum's co-founder and former director Rainer Hildebrandt, and they remained married until his death in 2004. She is internationally noted for leading the construction of the Freedom Memorial, which was controversially demolished in 2005. The focus of Alexandra Hildebrandt's work is the preservation and advancement of the Checkpoint Charlie Museum, the rehabilitation of the victims of the GDR-Regime, and the clarification of more destinies of refugees who suffered death at the East–west border. In 2004, she endowed the international human rights award, the Dr. Rainer Hildebrandt Medal, which is given annually in recognition of extraordinary, non-violent commitment to human rights.

From 2010 until 2013, Hildebrandt worked to secure the release of oligarch turned political activist, Mikhail Khodorkovsky. Initially she started with an exhibition in her Checkpoint Charlie Museum, to raise awareness about the fate of Khodorkovsky after Khodorkovsky's lawyers and family asked her for help. Eventually, she involved former German foreign secretary, Hans-Dietrich Genscher, in her international campaign to free Khodorkovsky. In 2013, Khodorkovsky was released from prison after serving some ten years.

Hildebrandt remarried in 2016 and has 8 children with her husband and 2 from a previous relationship.

== Laureates — Dr. Rainer Hildebrandt Human Rights Award ==
- 2005: Yitzhak Rabin (posthumously), Zheng Yichun
- 2006: Suzanne Mubarak
- 2007: Óscar Elías Biscet, Normando Hernández Gonzales, Harald Poelchau (posthumously), Muhammad Mugraby
- 2008: Rudolf Seiters, Juri Samodurow
- 2009: Bogdan Borusewicz
- 2010: Imre Pozsgay, Jurij Schmidt, Mikhail Khodorkovsky
- 2011: Antonia Rados
- 2012: Yoko Ono
- 2013: Guy von Dardel, Nina Lagergren (half sister of Raoul Wallenberg)
- 2014: Rupert Neudeck, Andrei Makarevich, Wolf Vostell (posthumously)
- 2015: Sergei Khrushchev
- 2016: Pál Maléter (posthumously), Zoltán Balog (politician)
- 2018: Lucius D. Clay (posthumously)
- 2019: Olga Benda, Danny Lewis Warrick

Members of the jury include: Henry Kissinger, Joachim Gauck, Avi Primor, James Douglas-Hamilton, Baron Selkirk of Douglas, Sara Nachama and Rainer Haushofer (nephew of Albrecht Haushofer).

== Publications ==
- "Es wird viel gewaltsames Sterben geben...Rainer Hildebrandt-Ein Leben für die Freiheit, Biografie Teil 1", 2014, ISBN 978-3-922484-70-7
- Ein Mensch Rainer Hildebrandt – Begegnungen Verl. Haus am Checkpoint Charlie, Berlin 1999, ISBN 3-922484-41-7
- Die Mauer.Zahlen.Daten, Haus am Checkpoint Charlie Verlag, Berlin 2001, ISBN 3-922484-43-3
- "DIE MAUER. Es geschah am Checkpoint Charlie", ISBN 978-3-922484-56-1
- "Geteiltes Deutschland. Grenzschilder", ISBN 978-3-922484-44-8
- "Zitate zur deutschen Teilung, zur MAUER und zur Wiedervereinigung", ISBN 978-3-922484-47-9
