= West Berlin =

Political enclave (1948–1990)

Coordinates: 52°30′00″N 13°16′48″E

West Berlin: West-Berlin; Berlin-Ouest; Berlin (West)
- 1948–1990
- Flag Coat of arms

- West Berlin (red)
- Status: Western Allied–occupied sectors of Berlin (de jure); Free city (de facto territory of West Germany)
- Official languages: German
- Governing Mayor
  - 1948–1953 (first): Ernst Reuter (SPD)
  - 1989–1990 (last): Walter Momper (SPD)
- Historical era: Cold War
  - Soviet-backed coup against the elected government of Berlin: November 1948
  - Reunification: 3 October 1990

Area
- 1989: 479.9 km^{2} (185.3 sq mi)

Population
  - 1989: 2,130,525
- Currency: Deutsche Mark (official); United States dollar (widely used)
Preceded by	Succeeded by
Allied-occupied Germany	Berlin
- Today part of: Germany

West Berlin (German: Berlin (West) or West-Berlin, German pronunciation: [ˈvɛstbɛʁˌliːn]) was a political enclave which comprised the western part of Berlin from 1948 until 1990, during the Cold War. Although West Berlin was de jure not part of West Germany, lacked any sovereignty, and was under military occupation until German reunification in 1990, the territory was claimed by the Federal Republic of Germany (FRG). The legality of this claim was contested by the Soviet Union and other Eastern Bloc countries, although West Berlin de facto aligned itself politically with the FRG from May 1949, was thereafter directly or indirectly represented in its federal institutions, and most of its residents were citizens of the FRG.

West Berlin was formally controlled by the Western Allies and entirely surrounded by East Berlin and East Germany. West Berlin had great symbolic significance during the Cold War, as it was widely considered by westerners an "island of freedom". It was heavily subsidized by West Germany as a "showcase of the West". A wealthy city, West Berlin was noted for its distinctly cosmopolitan character, and as a centre of education, research and culture. With about two million inhabitants, West Berlin had the largest population of any city in Germany during the Cold War era.

West Berlin was 160 km (100 mi) east and north of the inner German border and only accessible by land from West Germany by narrow rail and highway corridors. It consisted of the American, British, and French occupation sectors established in 1945. The Berlin Wall, built in 1961, physically separated West Berlin from both the eastern half of the city and its hinterland in Brandenburg, until it fell in 1989. On 3 October 1990, the day Germany was officially reunified, East and West Berlin united, joined the Federal Republic as a Stadtstaat (city-state) and eventually became the capital of Germany again.

== Origins ==
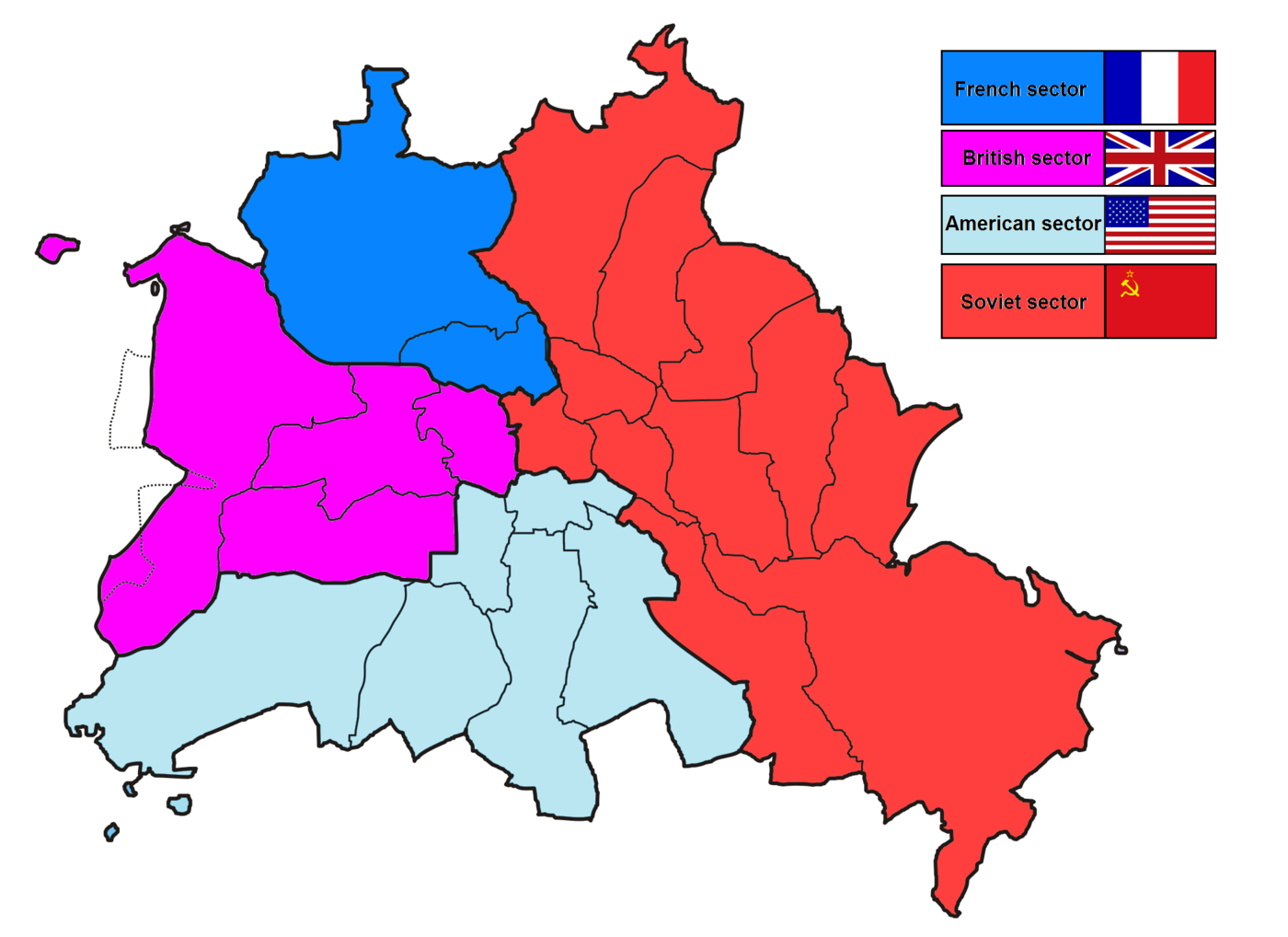
The four occupation sectors of Berlin. West Berlin is in light blue, dark blue, and purple, with several exclaves shown. Borough borders are as of 1987.

Map of West and East Berlin, border crossings, and metro networks

The London Protocol of 1944 and the Potsdam Agreement established the legal framework for the occupation of Germany in the wake of World War II. According to these agreements, Germany would be formally under the administration of four Allies (the United States, the United Kingdom, the Soviet Union, and France) until a German government "acceptable to all parties" could be established. The territory of Germany, as it existed in 1937, would be reduced by most of Eastern Germany thus creating the former eastern territories of Germany. The remaining territory would be divided into four zones, each administered by one of the four allied countries. Berlin, which was surrounded by the Soviet zone of occupation—newly established in most of Middle Germany—would be similarly divided, with the Western Allies occupying an enclave consisting of the western parts of the city. According to the agreement, the occupation of Berlin could end only as a result of a quadripartite agreement. The Western Allies were guaranteed three air corridors to their sectors of Berlin, and the Soviets also informally allowed road and rail access between West Berlin and the western parts of Germany.

At first, this arrangement was intended to be of a temporary administrative nature, with all parties declaring that Germany and Berlin would soon be reunited. However, as the relations between the Western Allies and the Soviet Union soured and the Cold War began, the joint administration of Germany and Berlin broke down. Soon, Soviet-occupied Berlin and western-occupied Berlin had separate city administrations. In 1948, the Soviets tried to force the Western Allies out of Berlin by imposing a land blockade on the western sectors—the Berlin Blockade. The West responded by using its air corridors for supplying their part of the city with food and other goods through the Berlin Airlift. In May 1949, the Soviets lifted the blockade, and West Berlin as a separate city with its own jurisdiction was maintained.

Following the Berlin Blockade, normal contacts between East and West Berlin resumed. This was temporary until talks were resumed. In 1952, the East German government began sealing its borders, further isolating West Berlin. As a direct result, electrical grids were separated and phone lines were cut. The Volkspolizei and Soviet military personnel also continued the process of blocking all the roads leading away from the city, resulting in several armed standoffs and at least one skirmish with the French Gendarmerie and the Bundesgrenzschutz that June. However, the culmination of the schism did not occur until 1961 with the construction of the Berlin Wall.

== Legal status ==
From the legal theory followed by the Western Allies, the occupation of most of Germany ended in 1949 with the establishment of the Federal Republic of Germany (West Germany) on 23 May and of the German Democratic Republic (East Germany) on 7 October. Under Article 127 of the Basic Law (or constitution) of the Federal Republic, provision was made for federal laws to be extended to Greater Berlin (as Berlin was called during the 1920 expansion of its municipal boundaries) as well as Baden, Rhineland-Palatinate and Württemberg-Hohenzollern within one year of its promulgation. However, because the occupation of Berlin could be ended only by a quadripartite agreement, Berlin remained an occupied territory under the formal sovereignty of the allies. Hence, the Basic Law was not fully applicable to West Berlin.

On 4 August 1950, the House of Representatives, the city's legislature, passed a new constitution, declaring Berlin to be a state of the Federal Republic and the provisions of the Basic Law as binding law superior to Berlin state law (Article 1, clauses 2 and 3). However, that became statutory law only on 1 September and only with the inclusion of the western Allied provision according to which Art. 1, clauses 2 and 3, were deferred for the time being; the clauses became valid law only on 3 October 1990 (the day of Germany's unification). It stated:

Article 87 is interpreted as meaning that during the transitional period Berlin shall possess none of the attributes of a twelfth Land. The provision of this Article concerning the Basic Law will only apply to the extent necessary to prevent a conflict between this Law and the Berlin Constitution....

Thus, civic liberties and personal rights (except for the privacy of telecommunications) guaranteed by the Basic Law were also valid in West Berlin.

In addition, West German federal statutes could only take effect in West Berlin with the approval of the city's legislature. The ambiguous legal status of the city, then still legally styled as Greater Berlin (although technically only comprising the western sectors), meant that West Berliners were not eligible to vote in federal elections. In their notification of permission of 12 May 1949 the three western military governors for Germany explained their proviso in No. 4, as follows:

A third reservation concerns the participation of Greater Berlin in the Federation. We interpret the effect of Articles 23 and 144 (2) of the Basic Law as constituting acceptance of our previous request that while Berlin may not be accorded voting membership in the Bundestag or Bundesrat nor be governed by the Federation she may, nevertheless, designate a small number of representatives to the meetings of those legislative bodies.

Consequently, West Berliners were indirectly represented in the Bundestag in Bonn by 22 non-voting delegates chosen by the House of Representatives. Similarly, the Senate (the city's executive) sent four non-voting delegates to the Bundesrat. In addition, when the first direct elections to the European Parliament were held in 1979, West Berlin's three members were instead indirectly elected by the House of Representatives.

However, as West German citizens, West Berliners were able to stand for election in West Germany. For example, Social Democrat Willy Brandt, who eventually became Chancellor, was elected via his party's list of candidates. The West German government considered all West Berliners as well as all citizens of the GDR to be citizens of West Germany. Male residents of West Berlin were exempt from the Federal Republic's compulsory military service. This exemption made the city a popular destination for West German young people, which resulted in a flourishing counterculture, which in turn became one of the defining features of the city.

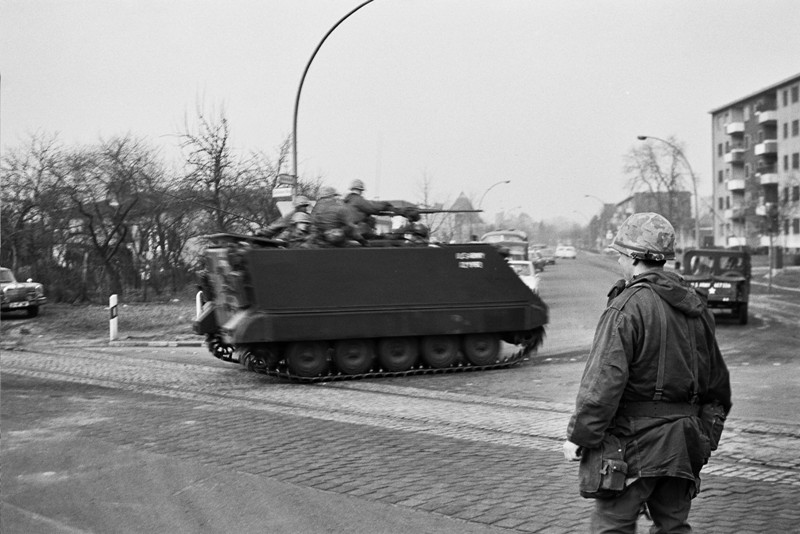
U.S. military vehicles pass through the residential district of Zehlendorf in 1969.

The Western Allies remained the ultimate political authorities in West Berlin. All legislation of the House of Representatives, whether of the West Berlin legislature or adopted federal law, only applied under the proviso of confirmation by the three Western Allied commanders-in-chief. If they approved a bill, it was enacted as part of West Berlin's statutory law. If the commanders-in-chief rejected a bill, it did not become law in West Berlin; this, for example, was the case with West German laws on military duty. West Berlin was run by the elected Governing Mayor and Senate seated at Rathaus Schöneberg. The Governing Mayor and Senators (ministers) had to be approved by the Western Allies and thus derived their authority from the occupying forces, not from their electoral mandate.

The Soviets unilaterally declared the occupation of East Berlin at an end along with the rest of East Germany. This move was, however, not recognised by the Western Allies, who continued to view all of Berlin as a jointly occupied territory belonging to neither of the two German states. This view was supported by the continued practice of patrols of all four sectors by soldiers of all four occupying powers. Thus, occasionally Western Allied soldiers were on patrol in East Berlin as were Soviet soldiers in West Berlin. After the Wall was built, East Germany wanted to control Western Allied patrols upon entering or leaving East Berlin, a practice that the Western Allies regarded as unacceptable. After protests to the Soviets, the patrols continued uncontrolled on both sides, with the tacit agreement that the western Allies would not use their patrolling privileges for helping Easterners to flee to the West.

In many ways, West Berlin functioned as the de facto 11th state of West Germany and was depicted on maps published in the West as being a part of West Germany. There was freedom of movement (to the extent allowed by geography) between West Berlin and West Germany. There were no separate immigration regulations for West Berlin, all immigration rules for West Germany being followed in West Berlin. West German entry visas issued to visitors were stamped with "for the Federal Republic of Germany, including the State of Berlin" (German: für die Bundesrepublik Deutschland einschl. [einschließlich] des Landes Berlin), prompting complaints from the Soviet Union. However, this wording remained on the visas throughout the rest of the entire period of West Berlin's existence.

Communist countries, however, did not recognise West Berlin as part of West Germany and usually described it as a "third" German jurisdiction, called an "independent political unit" (German: selbständige politische Einheit). On maps of East Berlin, West Berlin often did not appear as an adjacent urban area but as a monochrome terra incognita, sometimes showing the letters WB, meaning "Westberlin" (German: Westberlin) or overlaid with a legend or pictures. It was often labelled "Westberlin special political area" (German: Besonderes politisches Gebiet Westberlin).

West Berlin remained under military occupation until 3 October 1990, the day of unification of East Germany, East and West Berlin with the Federal Republic of Germany. The West German Federal Government, as well as the governments of most western nations, considered East Berlin to be a "separate entity" from East Germany, and while the Western Allies later opened embassies in East Berlin, they recognised the city only as the seat of government of the GDR, not as its capital.

== Immigration ==
The Federal Republic of Germany issued West German passports to West Berliners on request that showed West Berlin as their place of residence. However, West Berliners could not use their passports for crossing East German borders and were denied entrance by any country of the Eastern Bloc, since governments of these countries held the view that West Germany was not authorized to issue legal papers for West Berliners.

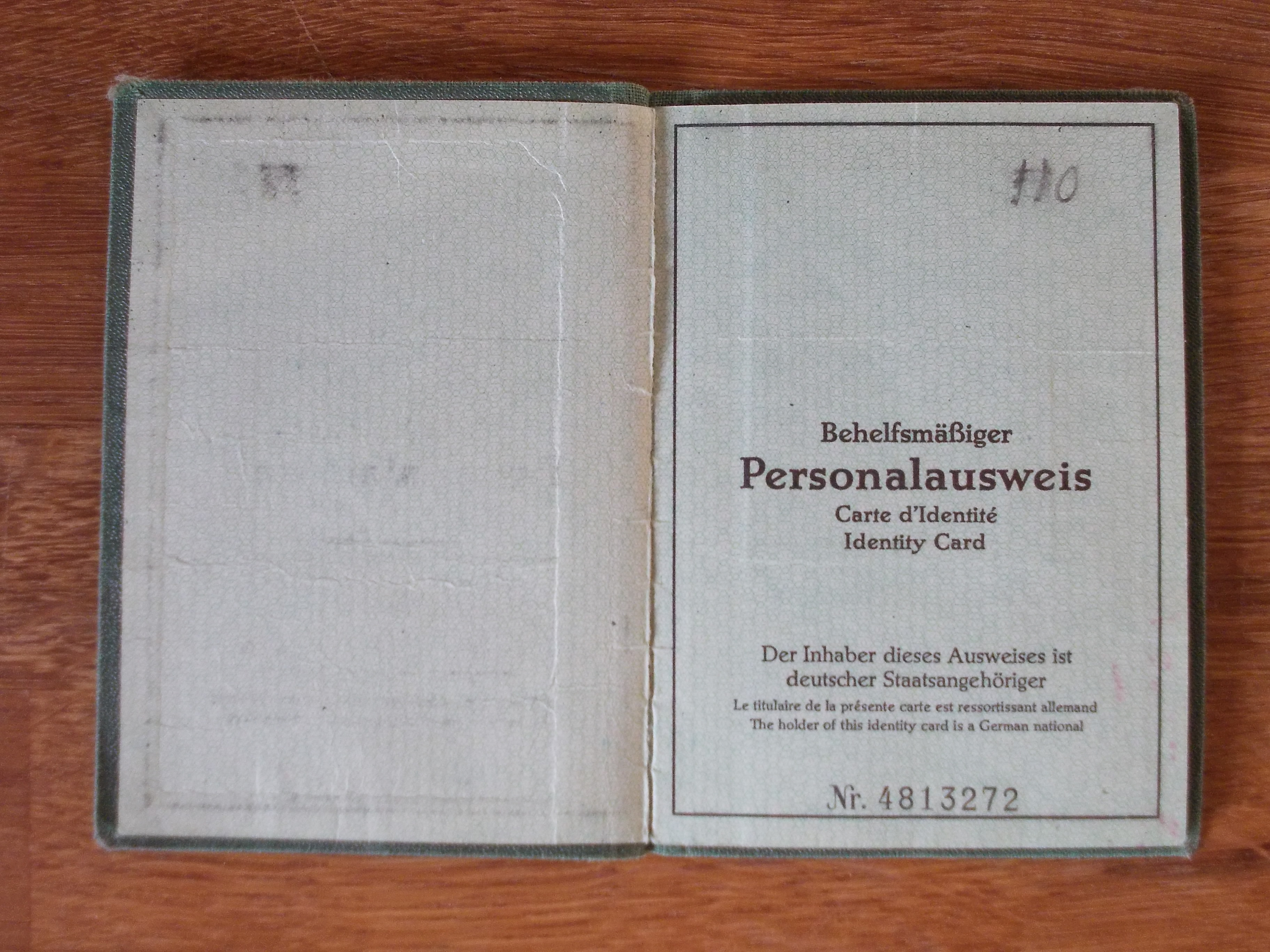
West Berlin auxiliary identity card, bearing the words "The holder of this identity card is a German national" in German, French and English

Since West Berlin was not a sovereign state, it did not issue passports. Instead, West Berliners were issued with "auxiliary identity cards" by the West Berlin authorities. These differed visually from the regular West German identity cards, with green bindings instead of the grey standard, they did not show the "Federal Eagle" or coat of arms, and contained no indications as to the issuing State. However, they did have a statement that the holder of the document was a German citizen. From 11 June 1968, East Germany made it mandatory that West Berlin and West German "transit passengers" obtain a transit visa, issued upon entering East Germany, because under its second constitution East Germany considered West Germans and West Berliners foreigners. Since identity cards had no pages to stamp visas, issuers of East German visas stamped their visas onto separate leaflets which were loosely stuck into the identity cards, which, until the mid-1980s, were little booklets. Although the West German government subsidized visa fees, they were still payable by individual travellers.

In order to enter visa-requiring Western countries, such as the US, West Berliners commonly used West German passports. However, for countries which did not require stamped visas for entry, including Switzerland, Austria, and many members of the then European Economic Community, including the United Kingdom, West Berlin identity cards were also acceptable for entry.

Active immigration and asylum politics in West Berlin triggered waves of immigration in the 1960s and 1970s, which led, in 2017, to Berlin becoming home to at least 178,000 Turkish and Turkish German residents, and making it the largest Turkish community outside of Turkey.

West Berlin was also a destination for many people fleeing East Germany both before and after the construction of the Berlin Wall. As many immigrants from East Germany did not intend to stay in Berlin, flights – the only option for those people to reach West Germany without coming into contact with East German authorities – were subsidized by the West German government despite being operated only by companies registered in and owned by nationals of the western occupying powers.

== Naming conventions ==
Most Westerners called the Western sectors Berlin unless further distinction was necessary. The West German Federal government officially called West Berlin Berlin (West), although it also used the hyphenated West-Berlin, whereas the East German government commonly referred to it as Westberlin. Starting from 31 May 1961, East Berlin was officially called Berlin, Hauptstadt der DDR ('Berlin, Capital of the GDR'), replacing the formerly used term Demokratisches Berlin ('Democratic Berlin'), or simply Berlin, by East Germany, and Berlin (Ost) by the West German Federal government. Other names used by West German media included Ost-Berlin, Ostberlin, or Ostsektor. These different naming conventions for the divided parts of Berlin, when followed by individuals, governments, or media, commonly indicated their political leanings, with the centre-right Frankfurter Allgemeine Zeitung using Ost-Berlin and the centre-left Süddeutsche Zeitung using Ostberlin.

== Period following the building of the Berlin Wall ==
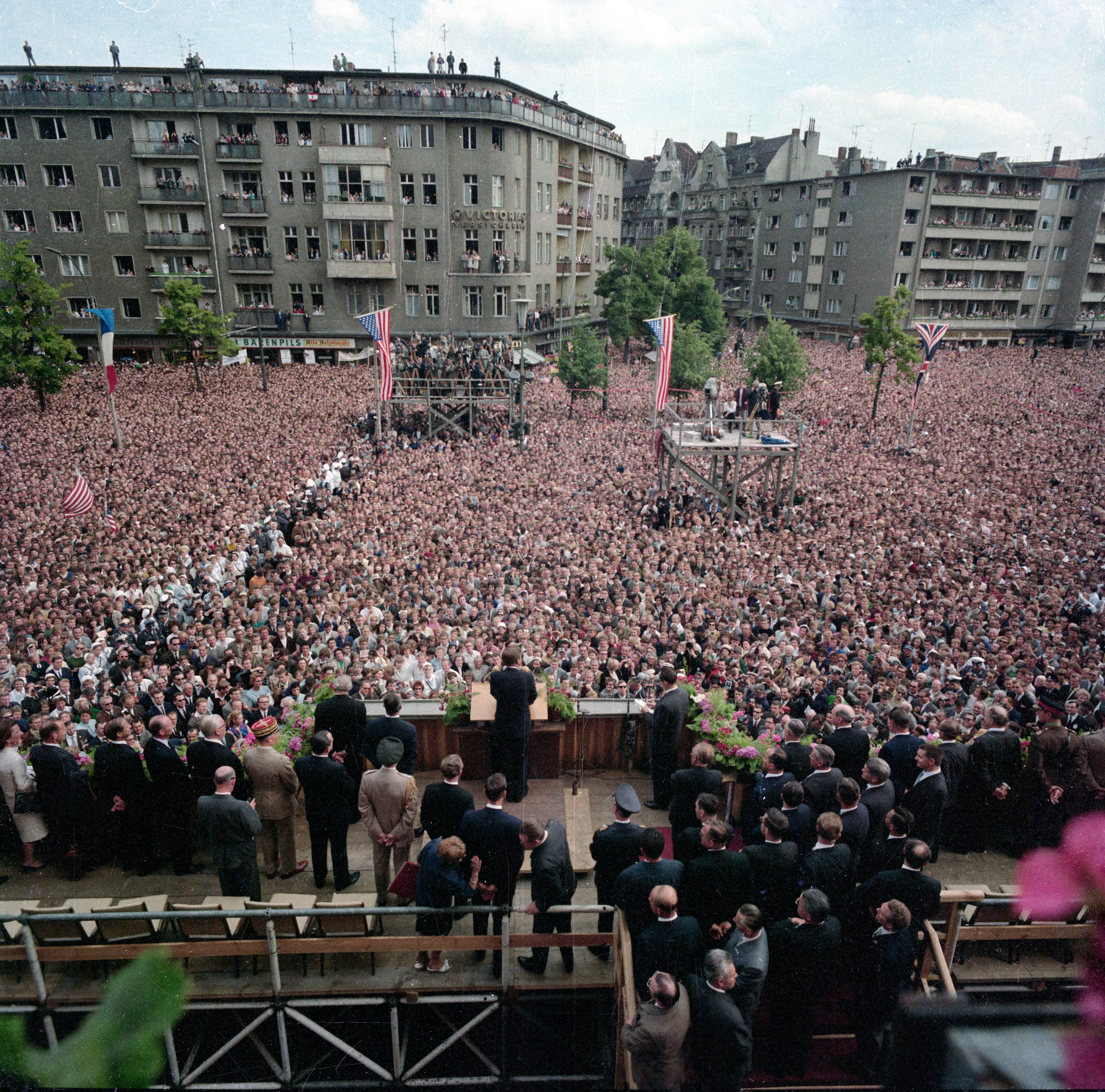
President John F. Kennedy addressing the people of West Berlin from Rathaus Schöneberg on Rudolf-Wilde-Platz (today's John-F.-Kennedy-Platz), 26 June 1963

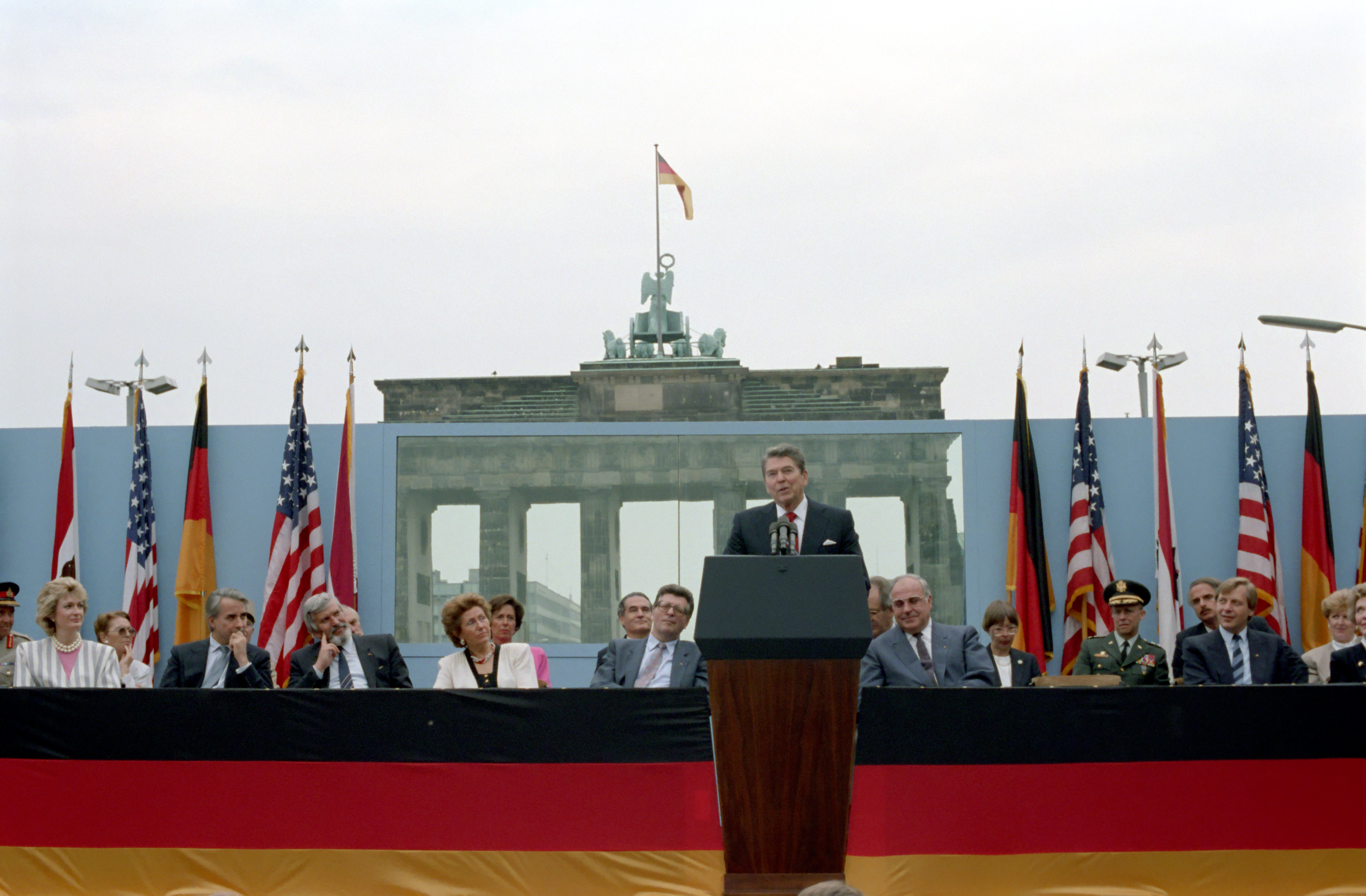
President Reagan speaking in front of the Brandenburg Gate giving the "Tear down this wall!" speech in 1987

After the Berlin Wall was constructed in 1961, West German Chancellor Konrad Adenauer suggested to U.S. President John F. Kennedy that the United States propose a swap of West Berlin with Thuringia and parts of Saxony and Mecklenburg; the city's population would have been relocated to West Germany. Adenauer did not believe that the Soviets would accept the offer because East Germany would lose important industry, but hoped that making the proposal would reduce tensions between the western and eastern blocs, and perhaps hurt relations between the USSR and East Germany if they disagreed on accepting the offer. While the Kennedy administration seriously considered the idea, it did not make the proposal to the Soviet Union.

NATO also took an increased interest in the specific issue related to West Berlin, and drafted plans to ensure to defend the city against a possible attack from the East. A tripartite planning group known as LIVE OAK, working together with NATO, was entrusted with potential military responses to any crisis.

On 26 June 1963, President Kennedy visited West Berlin. On his triumphant tour, cheered by hundred of thousands of West Berliners in the streets, he stopped at the Congress Hall, near the Brandenburg Gate, and at Checkpoint Charlie, before delivering at West Berlin's city hall a speech, which became famous for its phrase "Ich bin ein Berliner" and a hallmark of America's solidarity with the city.

The Four Power Agreement on Berlin (September 1971) and the Transit Agreement (May 1972) helped to significantly ease tensions over the status of West Berlin. While many restrictions remained in place, it also made it easier for West Berliners to travel to East Germany and it simplified the regulations for Germans travelling along the autobahn transit routes.

At the Brandenburg Gate in 1987, U.S. President Ronald Reagan provided a challenge to the then Soviet leader:

General Secretary Gorbachev, if you seek peace, if you seek prosperity for the Soviet Union and Eastern Europe, if you seek liberalization: Come here to this gate! Mr. Gorbachev, open this gate! Mr. Gorbachev, tear down this wall!

On 9 November 1989, the Wall was opened, and the two parts of the city were once again physically—though at this point not legally—united. The Two Plus Four Treaty, signed by the two German states and the four wartime allies, paved the way for German reunification and an end to the Western Allies' occupation of West Berlin. On 3 October 1990—the day Germany was officially reunified—East and West Berlin formally reunited as the city of Berlin, which then joined the enlarged Federal Republic as a city-state along the lines of the existing West German city-states of Bremen and Hamburg. Walter Momper, the mayor of West Berlin, became the first mayor of the reunified city in the interim. City-wide elections in December 1990 resulted in the first "all Berlin" mayor being elected to take office in January 1991, with the separate offices of mayors in East and West Berlin expiring by that time, and Eberhard Diepgen (a former mayor of West Berlin) became the first elected mayor of a reunited Berlin.

== Boroughs ==
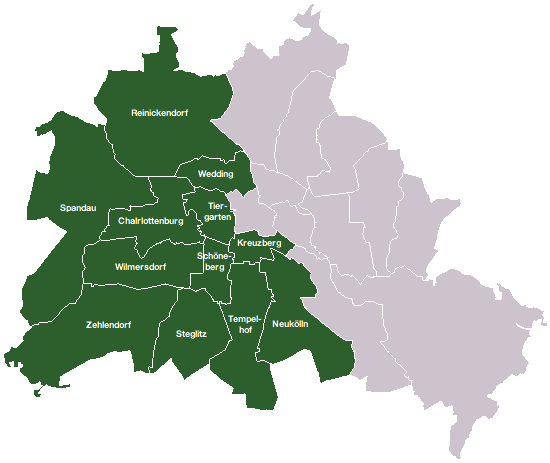

West Berlin comprised the following boroughs (Bezirke):

In the American sector:

- Neukölln
- Kreuzberg
- Schöneberg
- Steglitz
- Tempelhof
- Zehlendorf

In the British sector:

- Charlottenburg
- Tiergarten
- Wilmersdorf
- Spandau

In the French sector:

- Reinickendorf
- Wedding

== Exclaves ==
Map of divided Berlin, indicating by broken lines at Berlin's western border the land swap decided by the Allies. Five of the larger of West Berlin's originally twelve exclaves (Steinstücken, Laßzinswiesen, Falkenhagener Wiesen, Wüste Mark, Kienhorst) are shown.

West Berlin's border was identical to the municipal boundary of Berlin as defined in the Greater Berlin Act of 1920 and amended in 1938, and the border between the Soviet sector and the French, British, and American sectors respectively, which followed the boundaries of Berlin administrative boroughs as defined in the same years. Another amendment was added in 1945 at the border between the British sector of Berlin (ceding West-Staaken) and the Soviet zone (ceding the Seeburg Salient) so that the Wehrmacht airfield at Berlin-Gatow became part of the British sector and the airfield at Berlin-Staaken became part of the Soviet sector. The resulting borderline was further complicated with a lot of geographical oddities, including a number of exclaves and enclaves that Greater Berlin had inside some neighbouring municipalities since 1920, all of which happened to become part of the British or American sectors after 1945, so that parts of West Berlin came to be surrounded by East Germany

Furthermore, the Gatow/Staaken exchange in August 1945 resulted in the geographically western half of Berlin-Staaken, which was located in the western outskirts of the city, becoming de jure Soviet occupied. However, the de facto administration remained with the Borough of Spandau in the British sector. Therefore, all inhabitants of Staaken could vote in West Berlin's city state elections in 1948 and 1950. On 1 February 1951, East German Volkspolizei surprised the people of western Staaken by occupying the area and ended its administration by the Spandau Borough; instead, western Staaken became an exclave of the Soviet occupied borough Berlin-Mitte in the city centre. However, on 1 June 1952, western Staaken's de facto administration was placed with neighbouring East German Falkensee in the East German district Nauen.

== Post and telecommunications ==
West Berlin had its own postal administration first called Deutsche Post Berlin (1947–1955) and then Deutsche Bundespost Berlin, separate from West Germany's Deutsche Bundespost, and issuing its own postage stamps until 1990. However, the separation was merely symbolic; in reality, West Berlin's postal service was completely integrated with West Germany's, using the same postal code system.

West Berlin was also integrated into the West German telephone network, using the same international dialling code as West Germany, +49, with the area code 0311, later changed to 030. Unlike West Germany, from where calls to East Berlin were made using the prefix 00372 (international access code 00, East German country code 37, area code 2), calls from West Berlin required only the short code 0372. Conversely, those made to West Berlin from East Berlin only required the short code 849.

In order to reduce eastern wiretapping of telecommunications between West Berlin and West Germany, microwave radio relay connections were built, which transmitted telephone calls between antenna towers in West Germany and West Berlin by radio. Two such towers were built, one antenna in Berlin-Wannsee and later a second in Berlin-Frohnau, finished on 16 May 1980 with a height of 358 m (1,175 ft). This tower was demolished on 8 February 2009.

== Transport and transit travel ==
West Berliners could travel to West Germany and all Western and non-aligned states at all times, except during the Berlin Blockade by the Soviet Union (24 June 1948 to 12 May 1949) when there were restrictions on passenger flight capacity imposed by the airlift.

Travelling to and from West Berlin by road or train always required passing through East German border checks, since West Berlin was an enclave surrounded by East Germany and East Berlin. On 2 October 1967, six years after the Wall was constructed, tram tracks in West Berlin were removed because the authorities wanted to promote car usage, meaning that the tram system remaining today runs almost entirely within the former East Berlin.

=== Road traffic ===
As there were no dedicated walled-off-road corridors between West Germany and West Berlin under West German jurisdiction, travellers needed to pass through East Germany. A valid passport was required for citizens of West Germany and other western nationals to be produced at East German border checks. West Berliners could get admission only through their identity cards (see above). For travel from West Berlin to Denmark, Sweden and West Germany via dedicated East German transit routes (German: Transitstrecke), East German border guards issued a transit visa for a fee of 5 Western Deutsche Mark. For journeys between West Berlin and Poland or Czechoslovakia through East Germany, each traveller was also required to present a valid visa for the destination country.

The transit routes for road travel connecting West Berlin to other destinations usually consisted of autobahns and other highways, marked by Transit signs. Transit travellers (German: Transitreisende) were prohibited to leave the transit routes, and occasional traffic checkpoints would check for violators.

There were four transit routes between West Berlin and West Germany:

- One between West Berlin's Heerstraße with the East German checkpoint in Dallgow until 1951, then replaced by Staaken for destinations in Northern Germany (originally via highway F 5) at the Eastern checkpoint in Horst (a part of today's Nostorf) and the Western Lauenburg upon Elbe. These were replaced on 20 November 1982 by a new autobahn crossing at Zarrentin (E)/Gudow (W). On 1 January 1988, the new Stolpe checkpoint opened on this route to West Berlin. This is part of today's Hohen Neuendorf (E)/Berlin-Heiligensee (W).
- A second transit route led to northwestern and western Germany – following today's A 2 – crossing the inner German border at Marienborn (E)/Helmstedt (W), also called Checkpoint Alpha.
- A third route to southwestern Germany consisted of today's A 9 and A 4 with border crossing at Wartha (E)/Herleshausen (W).
- A fourth (via today's A 9) to Southern Germany had border crossings originally at Mount Juchhöh (E)/Töpen (W) and later at Hirschberg upon Saale (E)/ Rudolphstein (a part of today's Berg in Upper Franconia) (W).

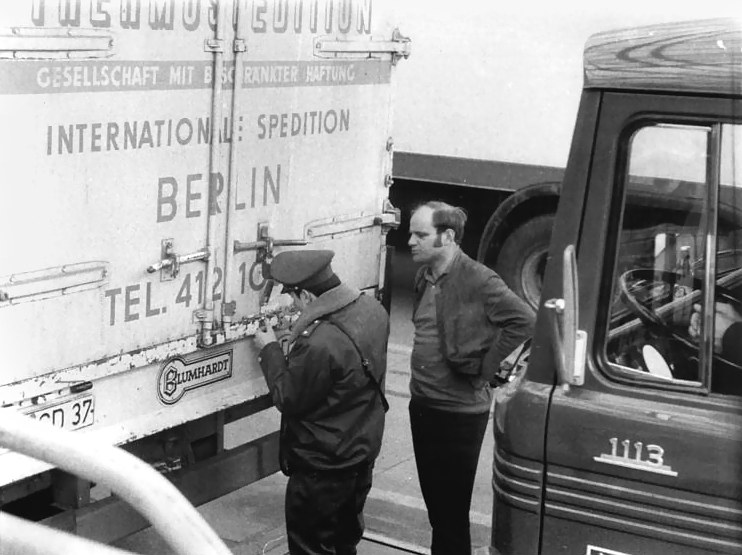
East German border crossing Potsdam-Drewitz on 31 March 1972: Applying eastern lead seals to western trucks, entering the transit route, in order to prevent potential Eastern German escapees from hiding in the cargo space

The latter three routes used autobahns built during the Nazi era. They left West Berlin at Checkpoint Dreilinden, also called Checkpoint Bravo (W)/Potsdam-Drewitz (E). Transit routes to Poland were via today's A 11 to Nadrensee-Pomellen (East Germany, GDR)/Kołbaskowo (Kolbitzow) (PL), eastwards via today's A 12 to Frankfurt upon Oder (GDR)/Słubice (PL), or southeastwards via today's A 13 and A 15 to Forst in Lusatia/Baršć (GDR)/Zasieki (Berge) (PL). Additional routes led to Denmark and Sweden by ferry between Warnemünde (GDR) and Gedser (DK) and by ferry between Sassnitz (GDR) and Rønne (DK) or Trelleborg (S). Routes to Czechoslovakia were via Schmilka (GDR)/Hřensko (Herrnskretschen) (ČSSR) and via Fürstenau (a part of today's Geising) (GDR)/Cínovec (Cinvald/Böhmisch Zinnwald) (ČSSR).

The transit routes were also used for East German domestic traffic. This meant that transit passengers could potentially meet with East Germans and East Berliners at restaurants at motorway rest stops. Since such meetings were deemed illegal by the East German government, border guards would calculate the travel duration from the time of entry and exit of the transit route. Excessive time spent for transit travel could arouse their suspicion and prompt questioning or additional checking by the border guards. Western coaches could stop only at dedicated service areas since the East German government was concerned that East Germans might potentially use coaches to escape into the West.

On 1 September 1951, East Germany, because of a shortage in foreign currencies, started to levy road tolls on cars using the transit routes. At first, the toll amounted to 10 Ostmark per passenger car and 10 to 50 for trucks, depending on size. Ostmarks had to be exchanged into Deutsche Mark at a rate of 1:1. On 30 March 1955, East Germany raised the toll for passenger cars to 30 Deutsche Marks, but after West German protests, in June of the same year, it changed it back to the previous rate.

=== Railway ===
Four transit train connections—earlier also called interzonal train (German: Interzonenzug)—connected West Berlin with Hamburg via Schwanheide (E)/Büchen (W) in the North, with Hanover via Marienborn (E)/Helmstedt (W) in the West, with Frankfurt am Main via Gerstungen (E)/Hönebach (W) in the Southwest, and with Nuremberg via Probstzella (E)/Ludwigsstadt (W) in the South of West Germany. These transit trains did not service domestic passengers of East Germany and made stops in East Germany almost exclusively for East German border guards upon entering and leaving the country. Until the construction of the Berlin Wall, interzonal trains would also stop once on their way within East Germany for travellers having a visa for entering or leaving East Germany. Train travel from West Berlin to Czechoslovakia, Denmark (by ferry), Poland and Sweden (by ferry) required a visa to enter East Berlin or East Germany to allow transfer to an international train—which also carried domestic passengers—bound for an international destination. One railway connection between West Berlin and Oebisfelde (E)/Wolfsburg (W) was reserved for freight trains only.

In July and August 1945, the three Western Allies and the Soviet Union decided that the railways, previously serviced by the Deutsche Reichsbahn (German Reich Railways), should continue to be operated by one railway administration to service all four sectors. West Berlin had – with the exception of a few small private railway lines – no separate railway administration. Furthermore, the operation of the Reichsbahn's Berlin S-Bahn electric metropolitan transport network, consisting of commuter trains, was also maintained. After the founding of East Germany on 7 October 1949 it gained responsibility for the Reichsbahn in its territory. East Germany continued to run its railways under the official name Deutsche Reichsbahn, which thus maintained responsibility for almost all railway transport in all four sectors of Berlin. The GDR-controlled 'Bahnpolizei', the Reichsbahn's railway police, were authorised to patrol station premises and other railway property in the whole city including West Berlin. The legal necessity of keeping the term 'Deutsche Reichsbahn' explains the surprising use of the word 'Reich' (with its Imperial and Nazi connotations) in the name of an official organisation of the communist GDR.

After the Berlin Blockade transit trains (German: Transitzüge) would leave and enter West Berlin only via one line through Berlin-Wannsee railway station (W) and Potsdam Griebnitzsee railway station (E). All transit trains would start or end in East Berlin, passing through West Berlin with only one stop in the Western Berlin Zoologischer Garten railway station, which became West Berlin's main railway station. Until 1952, the Reichsbahn also permitted stops at other stations on the way through the Western sectors.

Many Reichsbahn employees working in West Berlin were West Berliners. Their East German employer, whose proceeds from ticket sales for Western Deutsche Marks contributed to East Germany's foreign revenues, tried to hold down wage social security contributions in Western Deutsche Mark. Therefore, West Berlin employees of the Reichsbahn were paid partly in Eastern German currency. They could spend this money in East Germany and take their purchases to West Berlin, which other Westerners could not do to the same extent. West Berlin employees were trained in East Germany and employed under East German labour laws. West Berliners employed by the Reichsbahn were not included in the Western health insurance system either. The Reichsbahn ran its own hospital for them in West Berlin, the building of which is now used as the headquarters of Bombardier Transportation. For certain patients, the Reichsbahn would facilitate treatment in a hospital in East Berlin. In medical emergencies, the employees could use West Berlin doctors and hospitals, which would then be paid for by the Reichsbahn.

The GDR used the western stations to distribute propaganda and display posters with slogans like "Americans Go Home." On 1 May, May Day, a state holiday in East and West, S-Bahn trains were sometimes decorated with the East German banner and a red flag.

=== Waterways ===
Two waterways via the rivers and canals Havel and Mittellandkanal were open for inland navigation, but only freight vessels were allowed to cross from West Berlin into East German waters. The Havel crossed at the East German border in Nedlitz (a part of Potsdam-Bornstedt), continuing through the Elbe-Havel Canal and then either taking the Elbe northwestwards crossing the border again at Cumlosen (E)/Schnackenburg (W) or westwards following the Mittellandkanal to Buchhorst (Oebisfelde) (E)/Rühen (W). Western freight vessels could stop only at dedicated service areas, because the East German government wanted to prevent any East Germans from boarding them.

In July and August 1945, the Western Allies and the Soviet Union decided that the operation and maintenance of the waterways and locks, which were previously run by the national German directorate for inland navigation (German: Wasser- und Schifffahrtsamt Berlin), should be continued and reconstructed in all four sectors. Except for the originally city-owned Neukölln Ship Canal and some canals built later (e.g. Westhafen Canal) and locks, West Berlin had no separate inland navigation authority, but the East Berlin-based authority operated most waterways and locks, their lockmasters employed by the East. Because of their negligent maintenance, the western Allies later transferred their control to the Senate of Berlin (West).

The western entrance to the Teltowkanal, connecting several industrial areas of West Berlin for heavy freight transport, was blocked by East Germany in Potsdam-Klein Glienicke. Therefore, vessels going to the Teltowkanal had to take a detour via the river Spree through West and East Berlin's city centre to enter the canal from the East. On 20 November 1981, East Germany reopened the western entrance, which required two more vessel border checkpoints – Dreilinden and Kleinmachnow – because the waterway crossed the border between East Germany and West Berlin four times.

=== Air traffic ===
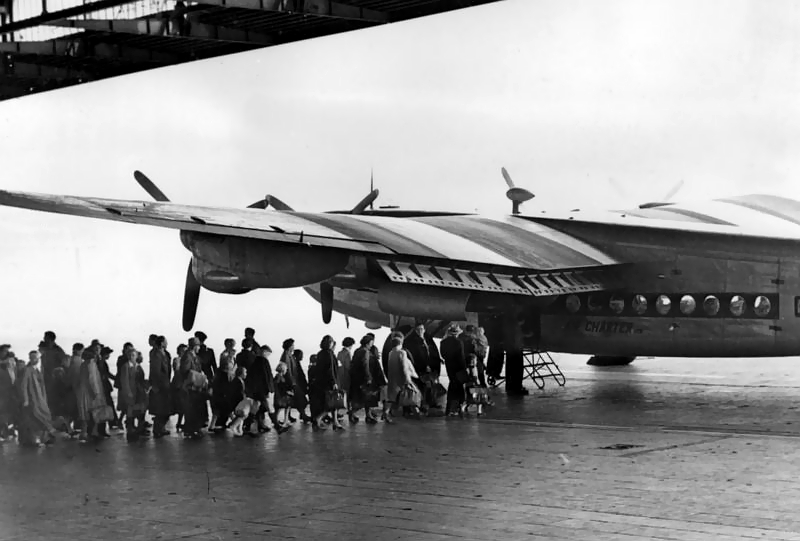
Eastern refugees boarding an Avro York at Tempelhof Airport to fly into West Germany, 1953

Air traffic was the only connection between West Berlin and the Western world that was not directly under East German control. On 4 July 1948, British European Airways opened the first regular service for civilians between West Berlin and Hamburg. Tickets were originally sold for pounds sterling only. West Berliners and West Germans who had earlier fled East Germany or East Berlin, and thus could face imprisonment on entering East Germany or East Berlin, could only take flights for travel to and from West Berlin. To enable individuals threatened by East German imprisonment to fly to and from West Berlin the West German government subsidised the flights.

Flights between West Germany and West Berlin were under Allied control by the quadripartite Berlin Air Safety Centre. According to permanent agreements, three air corridors to West Germany were provided, which were open only for British, French, or U.S. military planes or civilian planes registered with companies in those countries.

The airspace controlled by the Berlin Air Safety Center comprised a radius of 32 km (20 mi) around the seat of the center in the Kammergericht building in Berlin-Schöneberg – thus covering most of East and West Berlin and the three corridors, of the same width – one northwestwards to Hamburg (Fuhlsbüttel Airport), one westwards to Hanover, and one southwestwards to Frankfurt upon Main (Rhein-Main Air Base).

The West German airline Lufthansa and most other international airlines were not permitted to fly to West Berlin. Flights by Lufthansa or the East German airline Interflug servicing connections between East and West Germany (such as between Düsseldorf and Hamburg in West Germany and the East German city of Leipzig) began in August 1989, but these routes had to go through Czechoslovak or Danish airspace.

=== Traffic between West Berlin and East Germany ===
Until 1953, travelling from West Berlin into East Germany (German Democratic Republic (GDR)) fell under Interzonal traffic regulations overseen by the three Allied military governments (the Soviet Military Administration in Germany (SVAG), the Control Commission for Germany – British Element, and the Office of Military Government/United States (OMGUS)). On 27 May 1952, East Germany closed its border with West Germany and its 115 km (71 mi)-long border with West Berlin. From then on West Berliners required a permit to enter East Germany. East German border checkpoints were established in East German suburbs of West Berlin, and most streets were gradually closed for interzonal travel into East Germany. The last checkpoint to remain open was located at the Glienicker Brücke near Potsdam, until it was also closed by East Germany on 3 July 1953. The checkpoint at Staaken's Heerstraße remained open only for transit traffic to West Germany.

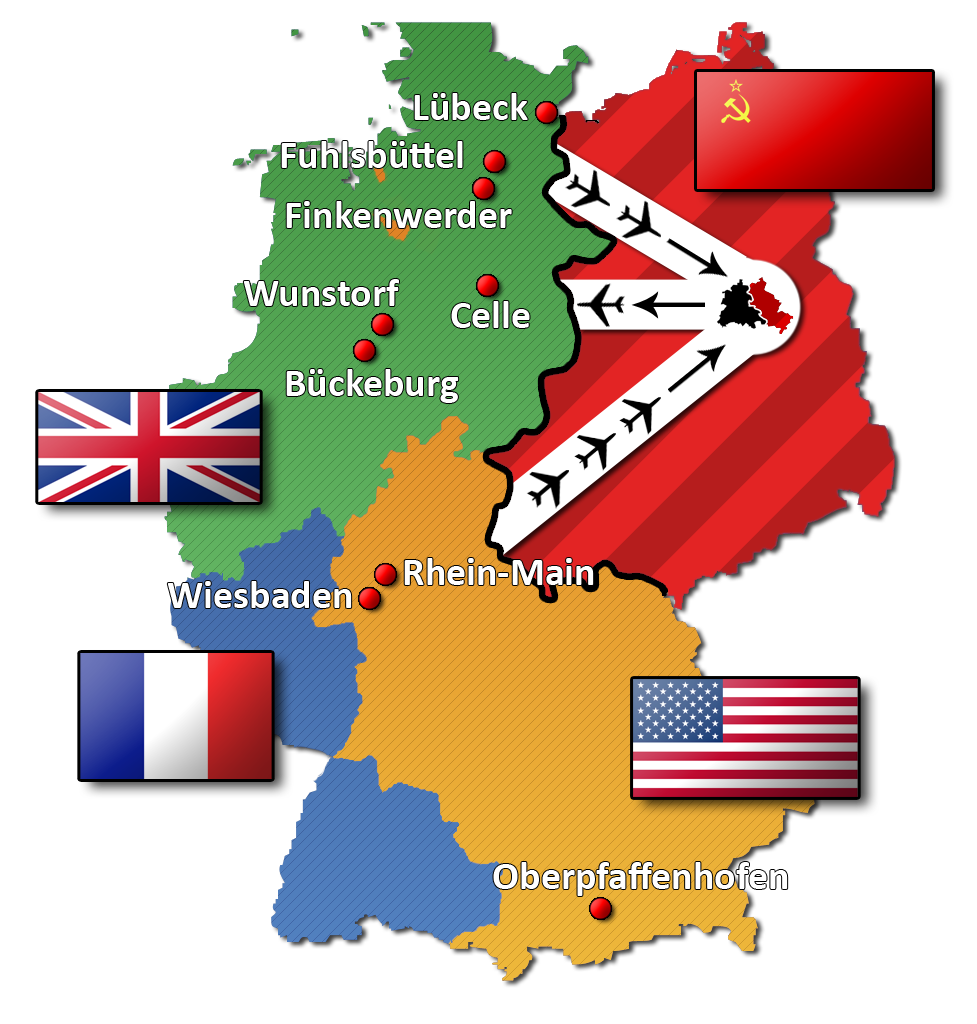
The only three permissible West Berlin Air Corridors

This caused hardship for many West Berlin residents, especially those who had friends and family in East Germany. However, East Germans could still enter West Berlin. A number of cemeteries located in East Germany were also affected by the closure. Many church congregations in Berlin owned cemeteries outside the city, so many West Berlin congregations had cemeteries that were located in East Germany. For example, the Friedhof vor Charlottenburg (in Cemetery in front/outside of Charlottenburg) was located in the East German suburb of Dallgow, yet belonged to Catholic congregations in Berlin-Charlottenburg. Many West Berliners wishing to visit the grave of a relative or friend on cemeteries located in East Germany were now unable to do so. Until 1961, East Germany occasionally issued permits to West Berliners to visit the cemeteries on the Catholic feast of All Saints on 1 November and on the Protestant Day of Repentance and Prayer.

In 1948–1952, the Reichsbahn connected the western suburbs of West Berlin to its S-Bahn network. Train routes servicing these suburbs formerly went through West Berlin stations, but ceased to make stops in the western stations or terminated service before entering West Berlin. Private West Berlin railway lines like the Neukölln–Mittenwalde railway (Neukölln-Mittenwalder Eisenbahn, NME), connecting the East German Mittenwalde with West Berlin-Neukölln and the Bötzowbahn between West Berlin-Spandau and East German Hennigsdorf, were disrupted at the border between West Berlin and East Germany on 26 October 1948 and August 1950, respectively.

Tramways and bus routes that connected West Berlin with its East German suburbs and were operated by West Berlin's public transport operator Berliner Verkehrsbetriebe Gesellschaft (BVG West) ceased operation on 14 October 1950, after West Berlin tram and bus drivers had been repeatedly stopped and arrested by East German police for having western currency on them, considered a crime in the East. The BVG (West) terminated route sections that extended into East Germany, like the southern end of tram line 47 to Schönefeld, the southwestern end of tram line 96 to Kleinmachnow, as well as two bus lines to Glienicke at the Nordbahn, north, and to Falkensee, northwest of West Berlin. The East German section of tram line 96 continued operating with eastern personnel and cars, obliging the eastern passengers – rarely westerners who needed special permits to enter East Germany – to change from eastern into western trains crossing the border by foot, until it was closed by the Wall.

The Reichsbahn shut down all of its West Berlin terminal stations and redirected its trains to stations in East Berlin, starting with Berlin Görlitzer Bahnhof – closed on 29 April 1951 – before serving rail traffic with Görlitz and the southeast of East Germany. On 28 August 1951, trains usually serving Berlin Lehrter Bahnhof were redirected to stations in East Berlin, while trains from West Germany were redirected to the Western Berlin Zoologischer Garten. The Reichsbahn also closed down both Berlin Anhalter Bahnhof and Berlin Nordbahnhof, on 18 May 1952.

On 28 August 1951, the Reichsbahn opened a new connection – from Spandau via Berlin Jungfernheide station – for the S-Bahn lines connecting East German suburbs to the west of West Berlin (namely Falkensee, Staaken) with East Berlin, thus circumventing the centre of West Berlin. In June 1953, the Reichsbahn further cut off West Berlin from its East German suburbs by the introduction of additional express S-Bahn trains (German: Durchläufer). These routes originated from several East German suburbs bordering West Berlin (such as Falkensee, Potsdam, Oranienburg, Staaken, and Velten), crossing West Berlin non-stop until reaching its destinations in East Berlin. However, the regular S-Bahn connections with West Berlin's East German suburbs, stopping at every Western station, continued. From 17 June to 9 July 1953, East Germany blocked off all traffic between East and West due to the Uprising of 1953 in East Germany.

From 4 October 1953, all S-Bahn trains crossing the border between East Germany and Berlin had to pass a border checkpoint in East Germany. Travellers from East Germany were checked before entering any part of Berlin, to identify individuals intending to escape into West Berlin or smuggling rationed or rare goods into West Berlin. S-Bahn trains were checked at Hoppegarten, Mahlow, and Zepernick in East Germany bordering East Berlin and in Hohen Neuendorf, Potsdam-Griebnitzsee, and Staaken-Albrechtshof in East Germany bordering West Berlin. On 4 June 1954, the Bahnhof Hennigsdorf Süd station located next to West Berlin was opened solely for border controls, also to monitor West Berliners entering or leaving East Berlin, which they could still do freely, while they were not allowed to cross into East Germany proper without a special permit.

In 1951, the Reichsbahn began construction work on the Berlin outer-circle railway line. This circular line connected all train routes heading for West Berlin and accommodated all domestic GDR traffic, thus directing railway traffic into East Berlin while by-passing West Berlin. Commuters in the East German suburbs around West Berlin now boarded Sputnik express trains, which took them into East Berlin without crossing any western sectors. With the completion of the outer-circle railway, there was no further need for express S-Bahn trains crossing the West Berlin border and thus their service ended on 4 May 1958, while stopping S-Bahn trains continued service. However, while East Germans could get off in West Berlin, West Berliners needed the hard-to get permits to enter East Germany by S-Bahn. With the construction of the Berlin Wall on 13 August 1961, all remaining railway traffic between West Berlin and its East German suburbs ended. Rail traffic between East and West Berlin was sharply reduced and restricted to a small number of checkpoints under GDR control. East Berliners and East Germans were then unable to freely enter and leave West Berlin. However, international visitors could obtain visas for East Berlin upon crossing one of the checkpoints at the Wall.

Following the policy of détente of the Federal Government under Chancellor Willy Brandt, West Berliners could again apply for visas to visit East Germany, which were granted more freely than in the period until 1961. On 4 June 1972, West Berlin's public transport operator BVG could open its first bus line into the East German suburbs since 1950 (line E to Potsdam via Checkpoint Bravo as it was known to the US military). This route was open only to persons bearing all the necessary East German permits and visas. For visits to East Germany, West Berliners could use four checkpoints along the East German border around West Berlin: The two road transit checkpoints Dreilinden (W)/Drewitz (E) and Berlin-Heiligensee (W)/Stolpe (E) as well as the old transit checkpoint at Heerstraße (W)/Staaken (E) and the checkpoint at Waltersdorfer Chaussee (W)/Schönefeld (E), which was also open for travellers boarding international flights at Schönefeld Airport.

=== Traffic between East and West Berlin ===
While East and West Berlin became formally separate jurisdictions in September 1948, and while there were travel restrictions in all other directions for more than a decade, freedom of movement existed between the western sectors and the eastern sector of the city. However, time and again Soviet and later East German authorities imposed temporary restrictions for certain persons, certain routes, and certain means of transport. Gradually the eastern authorities disconnected and separated the two parts of the city.

While the Soviets blocked all transport to West Berlin (Berlin Blockade between 24 June 1948 to 12 May 1949), they increased food supplies in East Berlin in order to gain the compliance of West Berliners who at that time still had free access to East Berlin. West Berliners buying food in East Berlin were regarded as approving of the Soviet attempt to get rid of the Western Allies in West Berlin. This was seen as support by the communists and as treason by most Westerners. Until that time all over Germany food and other necessary supplies had been available only with ration stamps issued by one's municipality. This was the case in East Berlin until the Communist putsch in Berlin's city government in September 1948 – the unitary City Council of Greater Berlin (German: Magistrat von Groß Berlin) for East and West.

By July 1948 a mere 19,000 West Berliners out of a total of almost 2 million covered their food requirements in East Berlin. Thus, 99% of West Berliners preferred to live on shorter supplies than before the Blockade, to show support for the Western Allies' position. In West Germany rationing of most products ended with the introduction of the Western Deutsche Mark on 21 June 1948. The new currency was also introduced in West Berlin on 24 June and this, at least officially, was the justification for the Soviet Blockade due to which rationing in West Berlin had to continue. However, in the course of the Berlin Air Lift some supplies were increased beyond the pre-Blockade level and therefore rationing of certain goods in West Berlin was stopped.

While West Berliners were officially welcome to buy food in East Berlin, the Soviets tried to prevent them from buying other essential supplies, particularly coal and other fuel. For this reason, on 9 November 1948, they opened checkpoints on 70 streets entering West Berlin and closed the others for horse carriages, lorries and cars, later (16 March 1949) the Soviets erected roadblocks on the closed streets. From 15 November 1948, West Berlin ration stamps were no longer accepted in East Berlin. All the same, the Soviets started a campaign with the slogan The smart West Berliner buys at the HO (German: Der kluge West-Berliner kauft in der HO), the HO being the Soviet zone chain of shops. They also opened so-called "Free Shops" in the Eastern Sector, offering supplies without ration stamps, but denominated at extremely high prices in Eastern Deutsche Marks. Ordinary East and West Berliners could only afford to buy there if they had income in Western Deutsche Mark and bartered the needed Eastern Deutsche Mark on the spontaneous currency markets, which developed in the British sector at the Zoo station. Their demand and supply determined a barter ratio in favour of the Western Deutsche Mark with more than 2 Eastern Deutsche Marks offered for one Western Deutsche Mark. After the Blockade, when holders of Western Deutsche Marks could buy as much as they could afford, up to five and six east marks were offered for one west mark. In the East, however, the Soviets had arbitrarily decreed a rate of 1 for 1 and exchanging at other rates was criminalised.

On 12 May 1949, the Blockade ended and all roadblocks and checkpoints between East and West Berlin were removed. The Berlin Airlift, however, continued until 30 September 1949 in order to build up supplies in West Berlin (the so-called Senate Reserve), in readiness for another possible blockade, thus ensuring that an airlift could then be restarted with ease. On 2 May 1949, power stations in East Berlin started again to supply West Berlin with sufficient electricity. Before then, electrical supply had been reduced to just a few hours a day after the normal supplies had been interrupted at the start of the Blockade. However, the Western Allies and the West Berlin City Council decided to be self-sufficient in terms of electricity generation capacity, to be independent of Eastern supplies and not to be held to ransom by the eastern authorities. On 1 December 1949 the new power station West (German: Kraftwerk West, in 1953 renamed after the former Governing Mayor of West Berlin into Kraftwerk Reuter West) went online and West Berlin's electricity board declared independence from Eastern supplies. However, for a time Eastern electricity continued to be supplied albeit intermittently. Supply was interrupted from 1 July until the end of 1950 and then started again until 4 March 1952, when the East finally switched it off. From then on West Berlin turned into an 'electricity island' within a pan-European electricity grid that had developed from the 1920s, because electricity transfers between East and West Germany never fully ceased.

In 1952, West Berliners were restricted entry to East Germany proper by means of a hard-to-obtain East German permit. Free entry to East Berlin remained possible until 1961 and the building of the Wall. Berlin's underground (Untergrundbahn, U-Bahn) and Berlin's S-Bahn (a metropolitan public transit network), rebuilt after the war, continued to span all occupation sectors. Many people lived in one half of the city and had family, friends, and jobs in the other. However, the East continuously reduced the means of public transport between East and West, with private cars being a very rare privilege in the East and still a luxury in the West.

Starting on 15 January 1953 the tram network was interrupted. East Berlin's public transport operator Berliner Verkehrsbetriebe (BVG-East, BVB as of 1 January 1969) staffed all trams, whose lines crossed the sectorial border, with women drivers, who were not permitted as drivers by the BVG (West), West Berlin's public transport operator. Instead of changing the Western rules, so that the Easterly intended interruption of the cross-border tram traffic would not happen, the BVG (West) insisted on male drivers. Cross-border tram traffic ended on 16 January. In East German propaganda this was a point for the East, arguing that the West did not allow drivers coming with their trams from the East to continue along their line into the West, but remaining silent on the fact that the end of cross-border tram traffic was most welcome to the East. The underground and the S-Bahn networks, except the above-mentioned traverse S-Bahn trains, continued to provide services between East and West Berlin. However, occasionally the East Berlin police – in the streets and on cross-border trains in East Berlin – identified suspicious behaviour (such as carrying heavy loads westwards) and watched out for unwelcome Westerners.

Occasionally, West Germans were banned from entering East Berlin. This was the case between 29 August and 1 September 1960, when ex-prisoners of war and deportees, homecomers (German: Heimkehrer), from all around West Germany and West Berlin met for a convention in that city. The homecomers released mostly from a long detention in the Soviet Union were unwelcome in East Berlin. As they could not be recognised through their identification papers, all West Germans were banned from East Berlin during those days. West Berliners were allowed, since the quadripartite Allied status quo provided for their free movement around all four sectors. From 8 September 1960 on, the East subjected all West Germans to apply for a permit before entering East Berlin.

As the communist government in the East gained tighter control, and the economic recovery in the West significantly outperformed the East, more than a hundred thousand East Germans and East Berliners left East Germany and East Berlin for the West every year. East Germany closed the borders between East and West Germany and sealed off the border with West Berlin in 1952; but because of the quadripartite Allied status of the city, the 46 km (29 mi)-long sectorial border between East and West Berlin remained open.

To stop this drain of people defecting, the East German government built the Berlin Wall, thus physically closing off West Berlin from East Berlin and East Germany, on 13 August 1961. All Eastern streets, bridges, paths, windows, doors, gates, and sewers opening to West Berlin were systematically sealed off by walls, concrete barriers, barbed wire, and/or bars. The Wall was directed against the Easterners, who by its construction were no longer allowed to leave the East, except with an Eastern permit, not usually granted. Westerners were still granted visas on entering East Berlin. Initially eight street checkpoints were opened, and one checkpoint in the Berlin Friedrichstraße railway station, which was reached by one line of the Western underground (today's U 6), two Western S-Bahn lines, one under and one above ground (approximately today's S 2 and S 3, however, lines changed significantly from 1990 onwards), and transit trains between West Germany and West Berlin started and ended there.

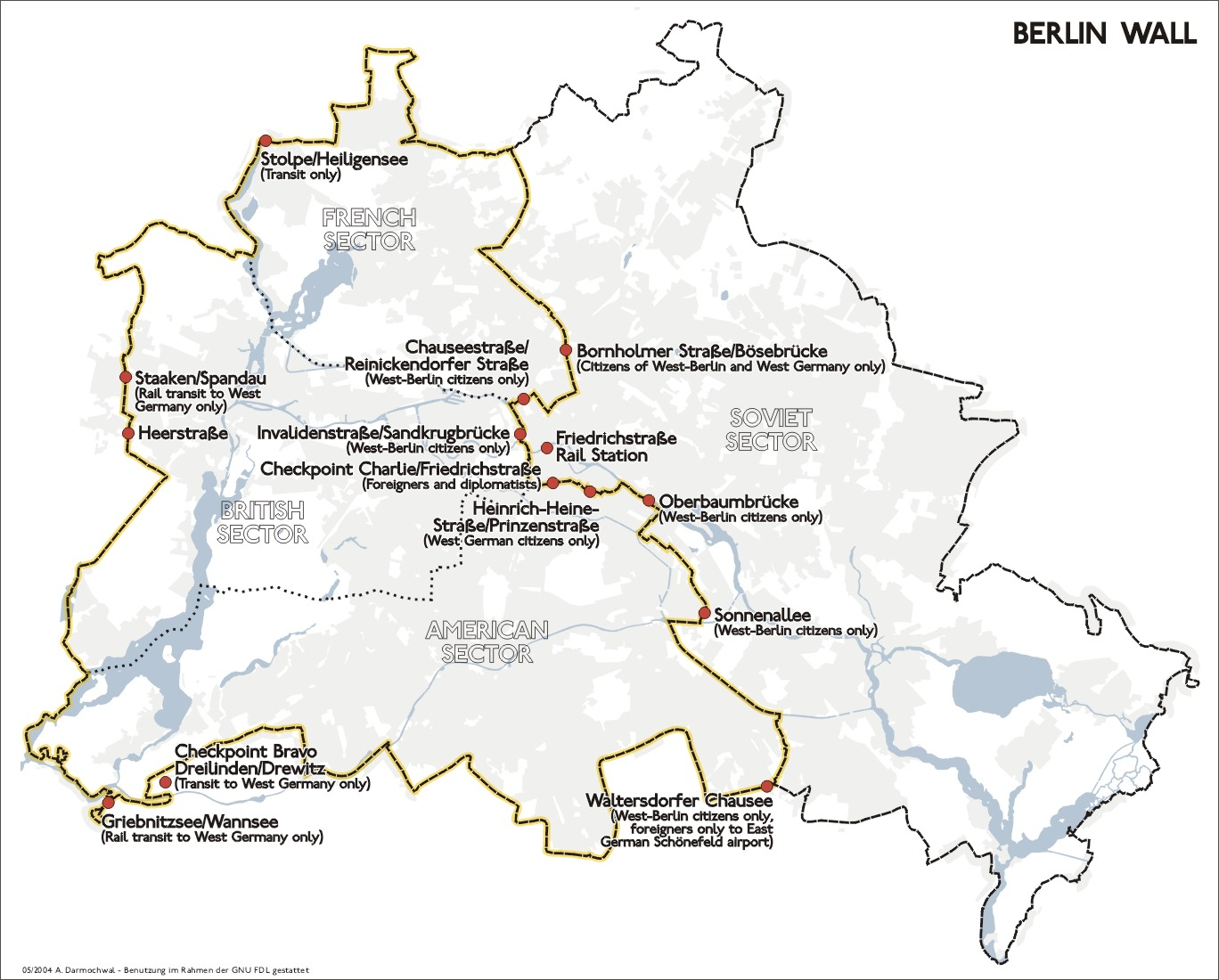
Map showing location of the Berlin Wall and transit points

The eight street checkpoints were – from North to South along the Wall – on Bornholmer Straße, Chausseestraße, Invalidenstraße, Berlin Friedrichstraße station, Friedrichstraße (Checkpoint Charlie in US military denomination, since this crossing was to their sector), Heinrich-Heine-Straße, Oberbaumbrücke, and Sonnenallee.

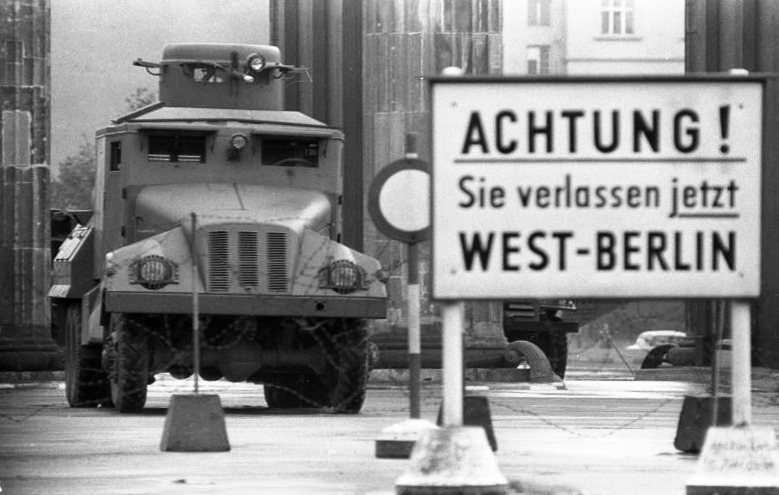
An eastern water cannon vehicle directed at western protesters in front of the Brandenburg Gate, August 1961

When the construction of the Wall started after midnight early on 13 August, West Berlin's Governing Mayor Willy Brandt was on a West German federal election campaigning tour in West Germany. Arriving by train in Hanover at 4 am he was informed about the Wall and flew to West Berlin's Tempelhof Central Airport.

Over the course of the day he protested along with many other West Berliners on Potsdamer Platz and at the Brandenburg Gate. On 14 August, under the pretext that Western demonstrations necessitated it, the East closed the checkpoint at the Brandenburg Gate 'until further notice', a situation that was to last until 22 December 1989, when it was finally reopened.

On 26 August 1961, East Germany generally banned West Berliners from entering the Eastern sector. West Germans and other nationals, however, could still get visas on entering East Berlin. Since intra-city phone lines had been cut by the East already in May 1952 (see below) the only remaining way of communication with family or friends on the other side was by mail or at meeting in a motorway restaurant on a transit route, because the transit traffic remained unaffected throughout.

On 18 May 1962 East Germany opened the so-called Tränenpalast checkpoint hall (Palace of Tears) at Berlin Friedrichstraße station, where Easterners had to say a sometimes tearful farewell to returning Westerners as well as the few Easterners who had managed to get a permit to visit the West. Until June 1963 the East deepened its border zone around West Berlin in East Germany and East Berlin by clearing existing buildings and vegetation to create an open field of view, sealed off by the Berlin Wall towards the West and a second wall or fence of similar characteristics to the East, observed by armed men in towers, with orders to shoot at escapees.

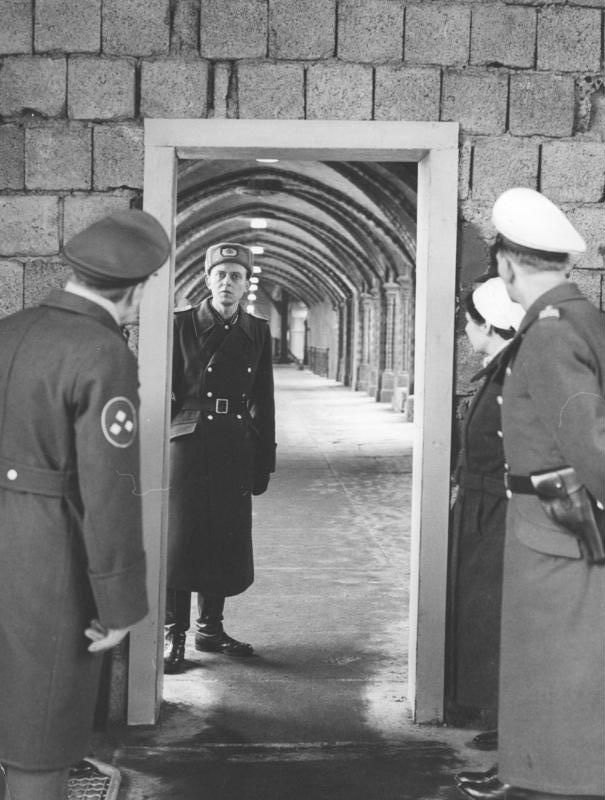
Western police awaiting an eastern border controller at the opening of a new pedestrian border crossing. View into the vaults of Oberbaumbrücke, 21 December 1963.

Finally, in 1963, West Berliners were again allowed to visit East Berlin. On this occasion a further checkpoint for pedestrians only was opened on the Oberbaumbrücke. West Berliners were granted visas for a one-day visit between 17 December 1963 and 5 January the following year. 1.2 million out of a total 1.9 million West Berliners visited East Berlin during this period. In 1964, 1965, and 1966 East Berlin was opened again to West Berliners, but each time only for a limited period.

East Germany assigned different legal statuses to East Germans, East Berliners, West Germans, and West Berliners, as well as citizens from other countries in the world. Until 1990 East Germany designated each Border crossings in East Berlin for certain categories of persons, with only one street checkpoint being open simultaneously for West Berliners and West Germans (Bornholmer Straße) and Berlin Friedrichstraße railway station being open for all travellers.

On 9 September 1964, the East German Council of Ministers (government) decided to allow Eastern pensioners to visit family in West Germany or West Berlin. According to the specified regulations valid from 2 November on Eastern pensioners could apply and were usually allowed, to travel into the West to visit relatives once a year for a maximum of four weeks. If pensioners decided not to return, the government did not miss them as manpower, unlike younger Easterners, who were subject to a system of labour and employment, which demanded that almost everybody work in the Eastern command production system.

On 2 December 1964 East Germany, always short of hard currency, decreed that every Western visitor had to buy a minimum of 5 Eastern Mark der Deutschen Notenbank per day (MDN, 1964–1968 the official name of the East German mark, to distinguish it from the West Deutsche Mark) at the still held arbitrary compulsory rate of 1:1. The 5 marks had to be spent, as exporting Eastern currency was illegal, which is why importing it after having bargained for it at the currency market at Zoo station was also illegal. Western pensioners and children were spared from the compulsory exchange (officially in German: Mindestumtausch, i.e. minimum exchange). Not long after East Germany held the first cash harvest from the new compulsory exchange rules by allowing West Berliners to visit East Berlin once more for a day during the Christmas season. The following year, 1965, East Germany opened the travelling season for West Berliners on 18 December. In 1966 it opened for a second harvest of Western money between the Easter (10 April) and Pentecost (29 May) holidays and later again at Christmas.

The situation only changed fundamentally after 11 December 1971 when, representing the two German states, Egon Bahr from the West and Michael Kohl from the East signed the Transit Agreement. This was followed by a similar agreement for West Berliners, once more allowing regular visits to East Germany and East Berlin.

After ratification of the Agreement and specifying the relevant regulations, West Berliners could apply for the first time again for visas for any chosen date to East Berlin or East Germany from 3 October 1972 onwards. If granted, a one-day-visa entitled West Berliners to travel to the East until 2 am the following day. The visitors were now spared the visa fee of 5 Western Deutsche Marks, not to be confused with the compulsory exchange amounting to the same sum, but yielding in return 5 Eastern marks. This financial relief did not last long, because on 15 November 1973 East Germany doubled the compulsory exchange to 10 Eastern marks, payable in West German Deutsche Marks at par.

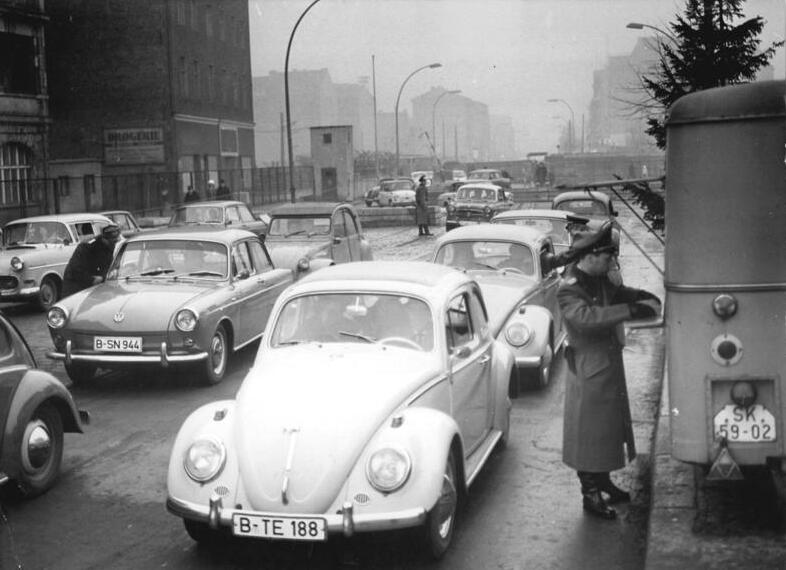
West Berliners entering East Berlin at the border crossing Chausseestraße on 28 December 1963 after having been banned from visiting the eastern sector for more than two years

One-day visas for East Berlin were now issued in a quickened procedure; visas for longer stays and visas for East Germany proper needed a prior application, which could be a lengthy procedure. To facilitate applications for West Berliners seeking such Eastern visas, the GDR Foreign Ministry was later allowed to open Offices for the Affairs of Visits and Travelling (German: Büros für Besuchs- und Reiseangelegenheiten) in West Berlin, which were not allowed to show any official symbols of East Germany. The Eastern officials working commuted every morning and evening between East and West Berlin. Their uniforms showed no official symbols except the name Büro für Besuchs- und Reiseangelegenheiten. They accepted visa applications and handed out confirmed visas issued in the East to the West Berlin applicants. A shed formerly housing one such Büro für Besuchs- und Reiseangelegenheiten can be found on Waterlooufer 5–7 in Berlin-Kreuzberg, close to Hallesches Tor underground station.

Another form of traffic between East and West Berlin was the transfer of West Berlin's sewage into East Berlin and East Germany through the sewer pipes built in the late 19th and early 20th centuries. The sewage flowed into the East because most of the pre-war sewage treatment facilities, mostly sewage farms, happened to be in the East after the division of the city. Sewer pipes, however, once discovered as a way to flee the East, were blocked by bars. West Berlin paid for the treatment of its sewage in Western Deutsche Marks which were desperately needed by the East German government. Since the methods used in the East did not meet Western standards, West Berlin increased the capacity of modern sewage treatment within its own territory, such that the amount of its sewage treated in the East had been considerably reduced by the time the Wall came down.

The situation with refuse was similar. The removal, burning or disposal of the ever-growing amount of West Berlin's rubbish became a costly problem, but here too an agreement was found since West Berlin would pay in Western Deutsche Marks. On 11 December 1974 East Germany and West Berlin's garbage utility company BSR signed a contract to dispose of refuse on a dump right beside the Wall in East German Groß-Ziethen (today a part of Schönefeld). An extra checkpoint, solely open for Western bin lorries (garbage trucks), was opened there. Later on, a second dump, further away, was opened in Vorketzin, a part of Ketzin.

As for the S-Bahn, operated throughout Berlin by the East German Reichsbahn, the construction of the Wall meant a serious disruption of its integrated network, especially of the Berlin's circular S-Bahn line around all of the Western and Eastern inner city. The lines were separated and those mostly located in West Berlin were continued, but only accessible from West Berlin with all access in East Berlin closed. However, even before the Wall had been built, West Berliners increasingly refrained from using the S-Bahn, since boycotts against it were issued, the argument being that every S-Bahn ticket bought provided the GDR government with valuable Western Deutsche Marks.

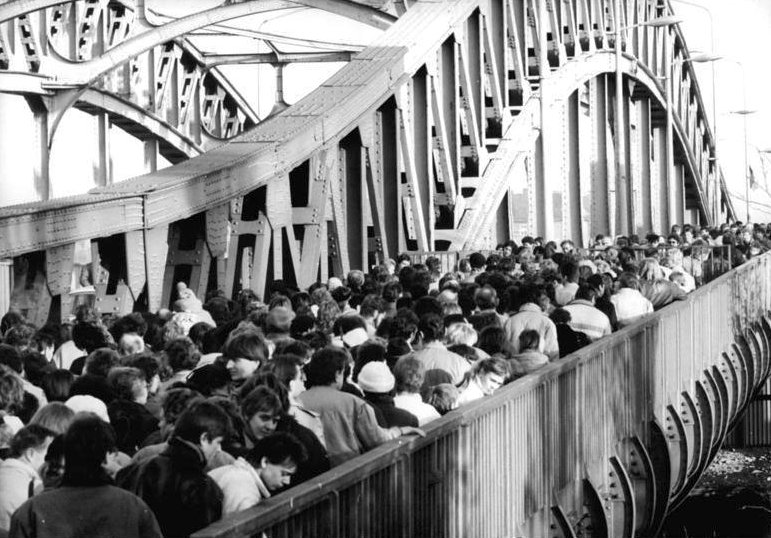
East Berliners, just having passed the now-open eastern checkpoint Bornholmer Straße, passing Bösebrücke into the French sector of Berlin on 18 November 1989

Usage dropped further as the Western public transport operator BVG (West) offered parallel bus lines and expanded its network of underground lines. After the construction of the Wall, ridership fell so much that running the S-Bahn lines in West Berlin turned into a loss-making exercise: wages and maintenance – however badly it was carried out – cost more than income from ticket sales. Finally, the Reichsbahn agreed to surrender operation of the S-Bahn in West Berlin, as had been determined by all Allies in 1945, and on 29 December 1983 the Allies, the Senate of Berlin (West; i.e. the city state government) and the Reichsbahn signed an agreement to change the operator from Reichsbahn to BVG (West) which took effect on 9 January 1984.

On 9 November 1989 East Germany opened the borders for East Germans and East Berliners, who could then freely enter West Berlin. West Berlin itself had never restricted their entry. For West Berliners and West Germans the opening of the border for free entry lasted longer. The regulation concerning one-day-visas on entering the East and the compulsory minimum exchange of 25 Western Deutsche Marks by 1989, continued. However, more checkpoints were opened. Finally, on 22 December 1989, East Germany granted West Berliners and West Germans free entry without charge at the existing checkpoints, demanding only valid papers. Eastern controls were slowly eased into spot checks and finally abolished on 30 June 1990, the day East and West introduced the union concerning currency, economy and social security (German: Währungs-, Wirtschafts- und Sozialunion).

=== Traffic between different parts of West Berlin crossing the East ===
When the Wall was built in 1961, three metro lines starting in northern parts of West Berlin passed through tunnels under the Eastern city centre and ended again in southern parts of West Berlin. The lines concerned were today's underground lines U 6 and U 8 and the S-Bahn line S 2 (today partly also used by other lines). On the sealing off of West Berlin from East Berlin by the Berlin Wall the entrances of the stations on these lines located in East Berlin were shut. However, western trains were allowed to continue to pass through without stopping. Passengers of these trains experienced the empty and barely lit ghost stations where time had stood still since 13 August 1961. West Berlin's public transport operator BVG (West) paid the east an annual charge in Western Deutsche Marks for its underground lines to use the tunnels under East Berlin. U 6 and S 2 also had one subterranean stop at the Eastern Berlin Friedrichstraße railway station, the only station beneath East Berlin where western U Bahn trains were still allowed to stop. Passengers could change there between U 6, S 2 and the elevated S 3 (then starting and ending in Friedrichstraße) or for the transit trains to West Germany, buy duty-free tobacco and liquor for Western marks in GDR-run Intershop kiosks, or enter East Berlin through a checkpoint right in the station.

== Media ==
ARD's television signal range in East Germany

West Berlin's primary television and radio stations were operated by Sender Freies Berlin, whose radio broadcasts began in 1953. Due to the regionalised structure of German public broadcasting, SFB had various interregional affiliations with the rest of West Germany, including Nordwestdeutscher Rundfunk's northwest and west German services (1953–54), ARD's national radio services (1954–90), Norddeutscher Rundfunk's northwest German services (1956–90), and Das Erste's national television channels (1958–90).

Rundfunk im amerikanischen Sektor was operated in large part by the United States Information Agency as a radio service, and often aired programming aimed at East German listeners. A RIAS television channel was launched in 1988.

Together, the two services reached most of East Germany to varying extents thanks to broadcasting from the centre of the rest of East Germany, where watching and listening to them was commonplace, and which inspired at least a handful of Republikflucht escape attempts to West Germany and Denmark.

== Sports ==
West Berlin was represented in West German sports competitions almost from the beginning.

=== Association football ===
In men's association football, the first team based in West Berlin to play in the postwar national championship, which at the time was an end-of-season tournament played by the teams that placed best in the interregional Oberligas, was Berliner SV 1892 in the 1949 German football championship. After the foundation of the Bundesliga in 1963, the presence of West Berlin teams from the 1966–67 Bundesliga onwards relied on remaining in or being promoted to it, on the same grounds as for West German teams.

The most successful West Berlin team was Hertha BSC, who stayed in the Bundesliga consistently throughout the 1970's. Despite never winning any trophies during the Cold War, they were runners-up in the 1974–75 Bundesliga, and reached the finals of the DFB-Pokal national cup twice in 1976–77 (losing after an initial final draw and resulting replay) and 1978–79.

=== Ice hockey ===
In men's ice hockey, the most successful West Berlin team in the Eishockey-Bundesliga was Berliner Schlittschuhclub, who won the league in the 1973–74 and 1975–76 seasons.

=== Other sports ===
The prologue and first two stages of the 1987 Tour de France took place entirely within West Berlin.

== See also ==
- Berlin Brigade
- Berlin Crisis of 1961
- Berlin Infantry Brigade
- French Forces in Berlin
- History of Germany (1945–1990)
- Judgment in Berlin
- List of Commandants of Berlin Sectors
- List of divided cities
- RAF Gatow
- Spandau Prison
- Stunde Null
- United States Army Berlin
- Water and sewage infrastructure in divided Berlin (1945–1990)
- West Berlin discotheque bombing

Preceded by Amsterdam	European City of Culture; 1988	Succeeded by Paris
