= Berlin-Buch station =

Railway station in Pankow, Germany

Berlin-Buch
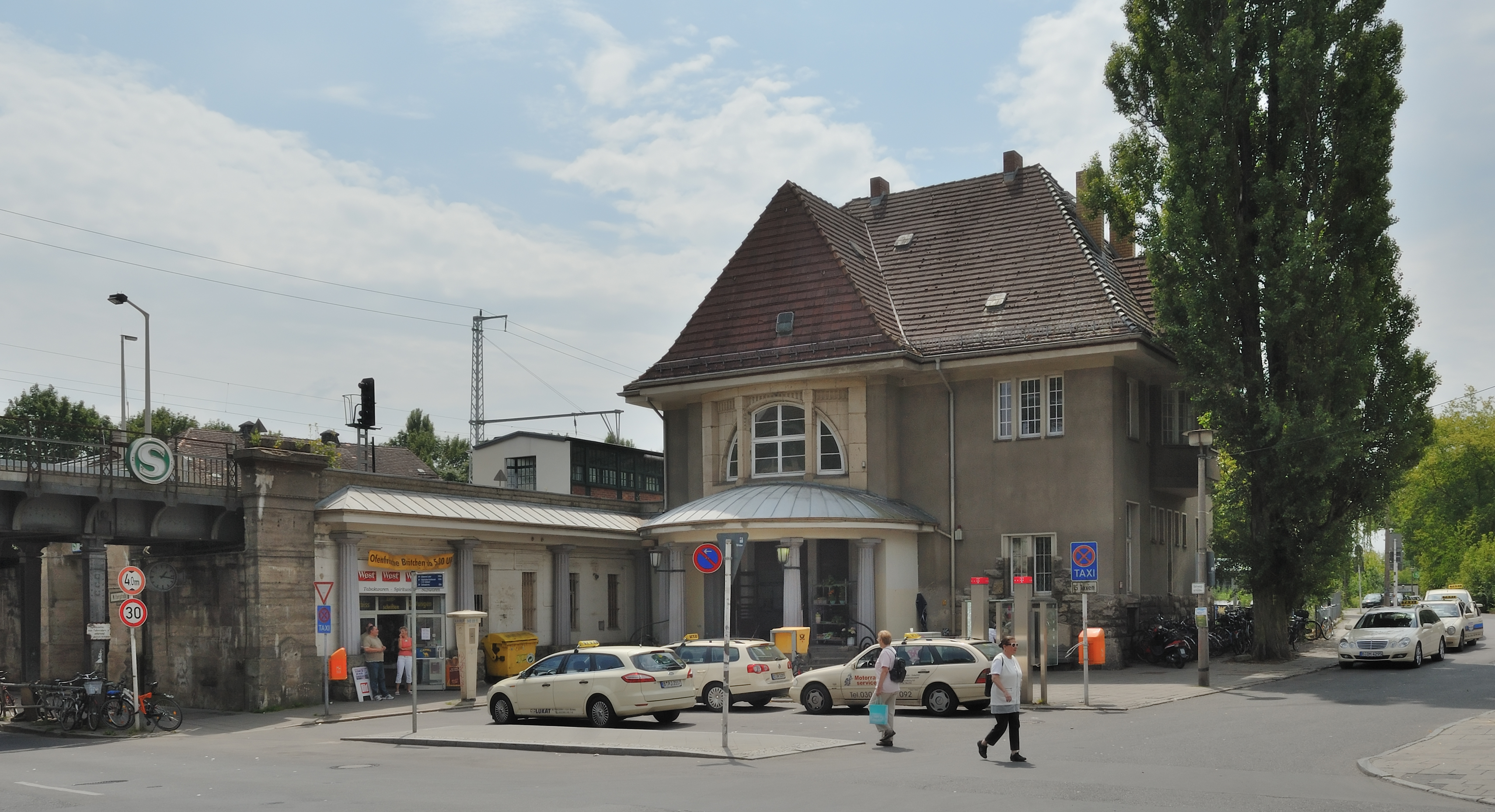

General information
- Location: Pankow, Berlin, Berlin; Germany
- Coordinates: 52°38′09″N 13°29′30″E
- Owner: DB Netz
- Operator: DB Station&Service
- Line: Berlin–Szczecin railway
- Platforms: 1 island platform
- Tracks: 2
- Train operators: S-Bahn Berlin
- Connections: S2

Other information
- Station code: 0536
- DS100 code: BBU
- Category: 5
- Fare zone: VBB: Berlin B/5656
- Website: www.bahnhof.de

Services
Preceding station	Berlin S-Bahn	Following station
Röntgental towards Bernau	S2	Berlin-Karow towards Blankenfelde
Location

Berlin-Buch (in German Bahnhof Berlin-Buch) is a railway station in the borough of Pankow, in Berlin, Germany. It is served by the Berlin S-Bahn and local bus lines.
