= Bernau-Friedenstal station =

Railway station in Bernau bei Berlin, Germany

Coordinates: 52.6685°N 13.5648°E

Bernau-Friedenstal
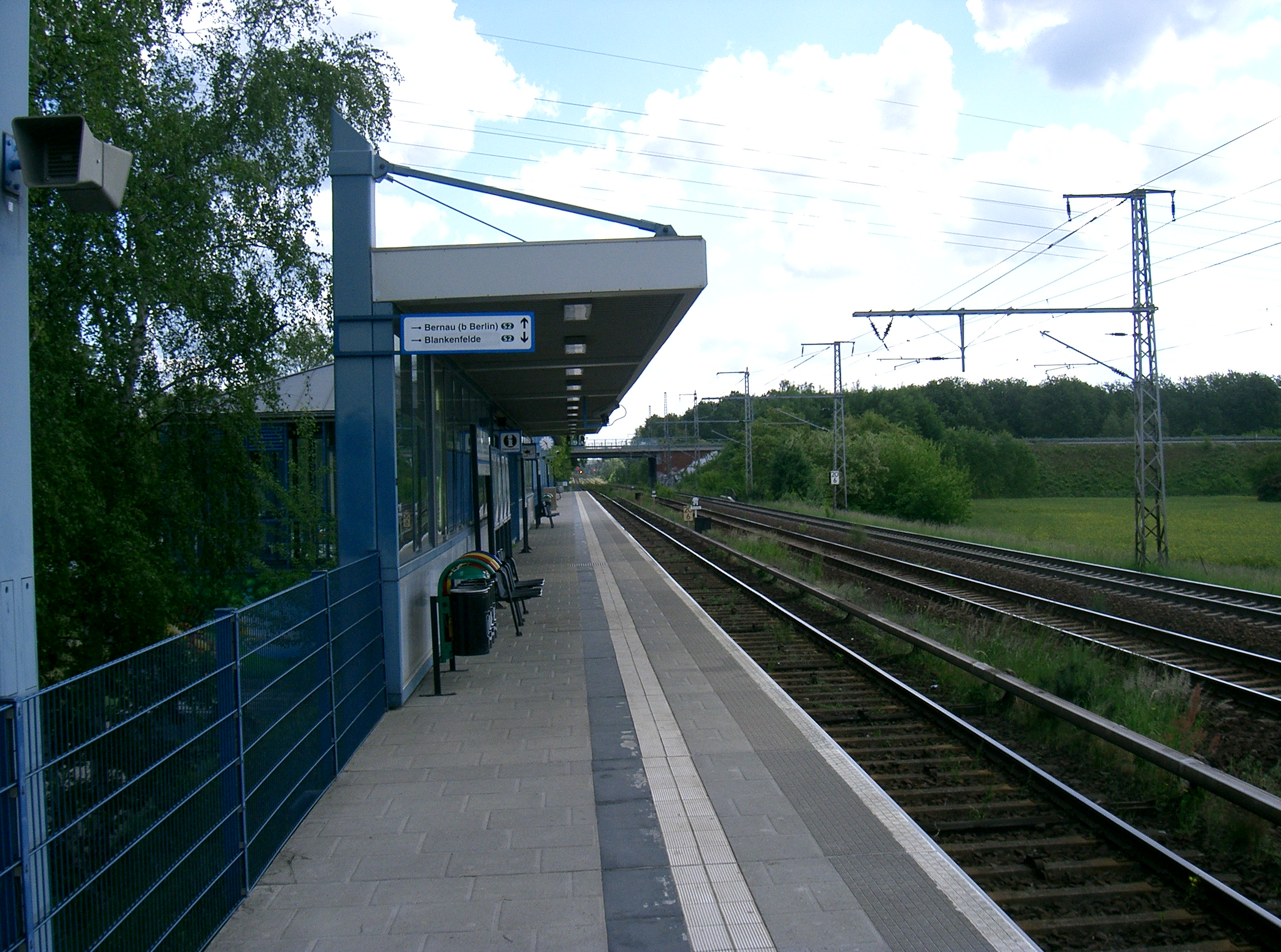

General information
- Location: Bernau bei Berlin, Brandenburg; Germany
- Owner: DB Netz
- Operator: DB Station&Service
- Line: Berlin–Szczecin railway
- Platforms: 1 side platform
- Tracks: 1
- Train operators: S-Bahn Berlin
- Connections: S2

Other information
- Station code: 7910
- DS100 code: BBRF
- Category: 4
- Fare zone: VBB: Berlin C/5158
- Website: www.bahnhof.de

Services
| Preceding station | Berlin S-Bahn | Following station |
|---|---|---|
| Bernau Terminus | S2 | Zepernick towards Blankenfelde |
Location

Bernau-Friedenstal (in German Bahnhof Bernau-Friedenstal) is a railway station in the city of Bernau bei Berlin, Germany. It is served by the Berlin S-Bahn.
