= Röntgental station =

Railway station in Panketal, Germany

Coordinates: 52.6486°N 13.5133°E

Röntgental
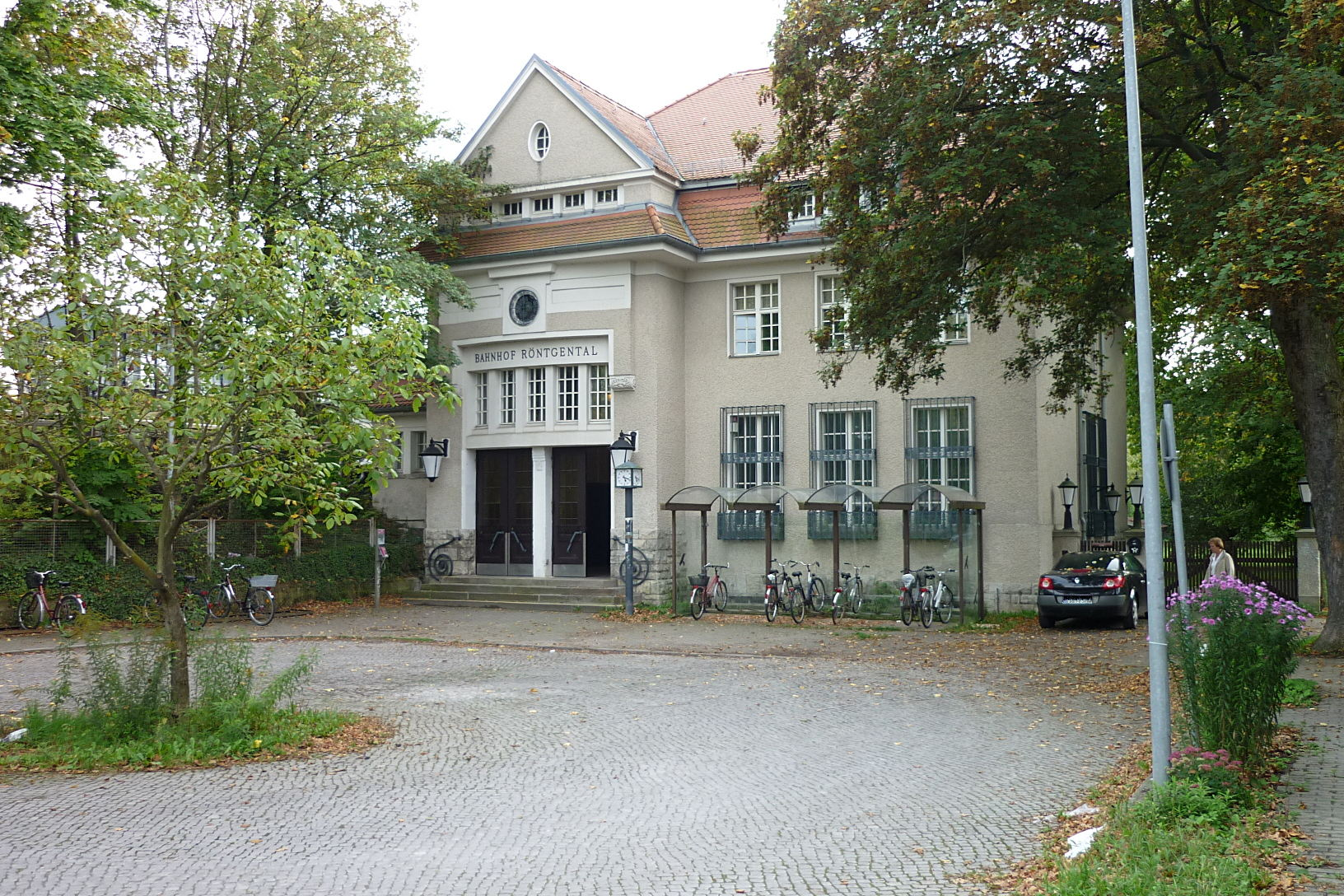

General information
- Location: Panketal, Röntgental, Brandenburg; Germany
- Owner: DB Netz
- Operator: DB Station&Service
- Line: Berlin–Szczecin railway
- Platforms: 1 side platform
- Tracks: 1
- Train operators: S-Bahn Berlin
- Connections: S2

Other information
- Station code: 5340
- DS100 code: BRGT
- Category: 4
- Fare zone: VBB: Berlin C/5257
- Website: www.bahnhof.de

Services
Preceding station	Berlin S-Bahn	Following station
Zepernick towards Bernau	S2	Berlin-Buch towards Blankenfelde
Location

Röntgental (in German Bahnhof Röntgental) is a railway station in the village of Röntgental, Germany, part of the municipality of Panketal. It is served by the Berlin S-Bahn.
