= Water and sewage infrastructure in divided Berlin (1945–1990) =

History of the water and sewage infrastructure during the division of Berlin

The political division of Berlin after the Second World War led to the fragmentation of the city’s water supply and wastewater disposal infrastructure. Large parts of both the water supply and wastewater disposal systems had been severely damaged during the war and reconstruction took place under the conditions of the emerging Cold War and thus the division of Berlin into east and west.

As the water supply and sewage systems are essential for the whole city, it was difficult to divide the infrastructure because it had been designed as an integrated system for the entire metropolitan area, taking into account parameters such as topography, gradients, and shared treatment facilities.

Despite initial expectations on both sides that the division of the city would be temporary, the water and sewage infrastructure in East and West Berlin gradually became more and more separated. This posed significant technical and administrative challenges. Many compromises had to be reached between the two halves of the city with regard to technical adaptations, political negotiations and interim arrangements. Much of the infrastructure was never fully separated.

== Historical background ==
=== Water supply in Berlin ===
In the 19th century, Berlin experienced significant population growth. Initially, the city's infrastructure was unable to keep pace with this expansion. Epidemics such as cholera had a major impact on urban life at that time. Therefore, during the 19th century, more and more large cities devoted themselves to hygiene issues, such as water supply and sewage disposal.

In Berlin, water supply and sewage disposal were initially considered together: an increased volume of water was intended to flush the gutters more effectively, thereby improving the drainage of sewage into the River Spree and its tributaries.

The focus of considerations regarding water supply was therefore on urban sanitation. However, as no uniform approach could be agreed upon for a long time, a delegation from Berlin visited waterworks in England and subsequently decided to build a waterworks with the support of an English company.

The foundation stone for Berlin's first waterworks was laid in 1853, and three years later it went into operation. It was a modern waterworks with steam-powered pumps and the first sand filter system on the European continent.

The connection of private households to Berlin's water supply was a bumpy process, which is why many people preferred to use well water for a long time. Nevertheless, by 1864, almost 4,000 houses were connected to the waterworks supply.

Until the establishment of ‘Greater Berlin’ in 1920, the water supply in the city was a patchwork quilt. With the incorporation of the surrounding towns, many smaller waterworks became the property of larger companies, gradually eliminating the patchwork quilt. One company that benefited particularly from this development was Charlottenburger Wasser- und Industriewerke AG.

=== Wastewater disposal in Berlin ===
For a long time, the city could not agree on how to modernise the sewage system. Finally, in 1871, urban planner James Hobrecht put an end to years of discussion with his proposal for a sewerage system for Berlin.

Hobrecht's ‘General Project for the Canalisation of Berlin’ ("Generelles Projekt für die Canalisation Berlins") essentially followed the idea of not designing a single sewerage system for the relatively flat city, but rather creating twelve drainage systems, also known as radial systems ("Radialsysteme").

The plan was for each system to run radially toward the lowest geographical point, where wastewater and rainwater would be collected together in pumping stations. In total, twelve pumping stations were planned. From there, the sewage was to be transported to the irrigation fields outside the city via pressure pipes.

== Impact of WWII destruction ==
=== Water ===
In total, the city recorded around 3,650 instances of damage to the pipe network and 27,000 destroyed house connection pipes.

The post-war period initially brought the water supply to a previously unheard-of level of unity, as the 'Städtische Wasserwerke' (Municipal Water Works) and the 'Charlottenburger Wasser- und Industriewerke AG' (Charlottenburg Water and Industrial Works Ltd.) were merged in 1945. Before the end of the year, the city's 18 waterworks were operating under a single management. This marked the first time in the city's history that the water supply had been unified.

After this agreement, a period of reconstruction began. Between 1946 and 1948, the waterworks gained an overview of the extent of the destruction and devoted themselves to rebuilding. This posed major challenges for the Berlin waterworks: every time rubble was cleared from Berlin, the pipes had to be secured, and the search for burst pipes continued due to ongoing water losses.

=== Wastewater ===
The war, as well as the fascist racial laws, had caused the Berlin drainage services to lose a substantial portion of their skilled personnel. While some vacant administrative positions could be filled by women, work in the sewer system often required a high level of physical endurance.

The sewage system was in significantly worse condition than the water supply. One of the main reasons for this was that the sewage pressure pipes often ran along bridges that had suffered severe damage during the war, especially in the final months. Of the numerous destroyed bridges, 128 also contained sewage pressure pipes. In addition, all of the city's drainage pumps were out of service. At least the lower-lying sewers had suffered far less damage.

The pumping stations were out of service, so the sewage flowed back into Berlin's waterways via the emergency outlets. Due to the destruction of bridges, these waterways were often unable to carry the flow, which led to backwater and turned Berlin's waterways into sewers.

Given the high priority accorded to rebuilding the infrastructure, 20 of the destroyed pumping stations were back in operation by the end of 1945. By spring 1946, the city's drainage system was finally fully functional again.

== Division of the water supply system after 1945 ==
In contrast to the electricity and gas supply, the water supply initially remained in the joint supply network. The Berlin Waterworks thus operated as a single utility serving the city as a whole, while in practice being subject to two separate municipal administrations. Accordingly, employees were paid their wages in both East German and West German currency.

Owing to numerous difficulties that impaired the operation of the waterworks, the two directors based in East Berlin decided, for practical reasons, to establish a separate administrative structure in West Berlin. The East Berlin Magistrate, however, reacted unfavourably and dismissed the directors in March 1949.

This, in turn, prompted the West Berlin Magistrate to appoint the two former directors to positions in the western part of the city and, later that same month, to establish a separate administration in the former administrative buildings of Charlotte Wasser, despite lacking access to relevant documentation.

As a result, an administrative separation had been completed, while a separation of the actual water supply—shaped by historically developed distribution structures—did not initially take place. Consequently, the Johannisthal waterworks continued to supply Neukölln, Britz, Tempelhof, Buckow, and Rudow with water, while waterworks located in West Berlin also supplied areas within East Berlin. Likewise, railway stations and operational facilities of the Deutsche Reichsbahn located in East Berlin continued to be supplied with water from West Berlin.

As a result of the administrative separation, the East Berlin waterworks began billing the West Berlin waterworks for the supply of Neukölln. When West Berlin initially refused to accept these charges, the East Berlin waterworks closed the valves on 3 July 1950, leaving approximately 300,000 residents of Neukölln partially or completely without water.

Water supply was subsequently maintained on an emergency basis through public water distribution points. Owing to the urgency of the situation, negotiations were quickly initiated, during which West Berlin agreed to make the payments. The valves were reopened later in July. The new agreements also included the billing of East Berlin railway stations.

== Division of the wastewater infrastructure after 1945 ==
The division of Berlin's sewer system posed a considerable challenge, as the sewage system formed a single technical unit. For this reason, the sewers remained open, particularly in the early years of the division.

Since the sewer system was structured according to the natural terrain, wastewater continued to flow from East to West Berlin and from West to East Berlin during the Berlin Blockade, depending on the respective gradient. Despite this bidirectional flow, however, there was a clear asymmetry in favour of the Soviet Occupation Zone (SBZ): West Berlin was highly dependent on East Berlin for the disposal of its sewage. Historian Timothy Moss even states that West Berlin was only able to treat 10% of its own sewage on its own territory, meaning that 90% had to be disposed of in East Berlin or the German Democratic Republic (GDR).

It was not until 1950 that the two halves of the city, which were now considered two separate cities politically, reached an agreement. This stipulated that West Berlin would have to compensate the GDR financially for waste disposal services in future. However, after the Berlin Wall was built, new negotiations were necessary to regulate the changed situation.

West Berlin sought to reduce its dependence on East Berlin and therefore decided to build new sewage treatment plants in 1954.

The city then built one in Ruhleben and one in Marienfelde; a third planned sewage treatment plant was never realised. The expansion of these sewage treatment plants changed the conditions regarding wastewater disposal: in future, the GDR would have had to pay West Berlin for the disposal of wastewater.

Over the years, West Berlin significantly expanded its wastewater treatment capacity. This development, however, was not unusual in cities of West Germany at the time, as sewerage systems were also being expanded in other West German cities. From 1950 onward, West Berlin can be counted among these cities despite its special political status, which remained in place until 1990.

East Berlin also sought to free itself from dependence on its western counterpart. Although the septic drain fields (Rieselfelder) were generally located within the territory of the German Democratic Republic, approximately 30 million cubic metres of wastewater flowed through West Berlin to reach them each year. As a result, the GDR remained dependent on West Berlin’s continued use of these facilities; any refusal to accept the wastewater could have had serious consequences.

It was not until 1970 that the final separation of the wastewater system from the East German authorities was initiated. As increasingly efficient wastewater treatment plants were being built in the western part of the city, concerns arose in East Berlin about a growing imbalance. To prevent this, pumping stations were planned along the entire Inner Berlin border in East Berlin, designed to divert wastewater around West Berlin. The objective was to ensure that, by 1990, no wastewater would need to pass through West Berlin. In contrast to the Hobrecht radial system, which was aligned with the natural conditions of the terrain, this undertaking was organized along political boundaries and was therefore technically complex and costly, leading to repeated delays. By the time of the fall of the Berlin Wall, only five of the ten planned pumping stations had been acquired.

== See also ==
- History of water supply and sanitation
- Water supply and sanitation in Germany
