= Zepernick station =

Railway station in Panketal, Germany

Coordinates: 52.6597°N 13.5338°E

Zepernick (b Bernau)
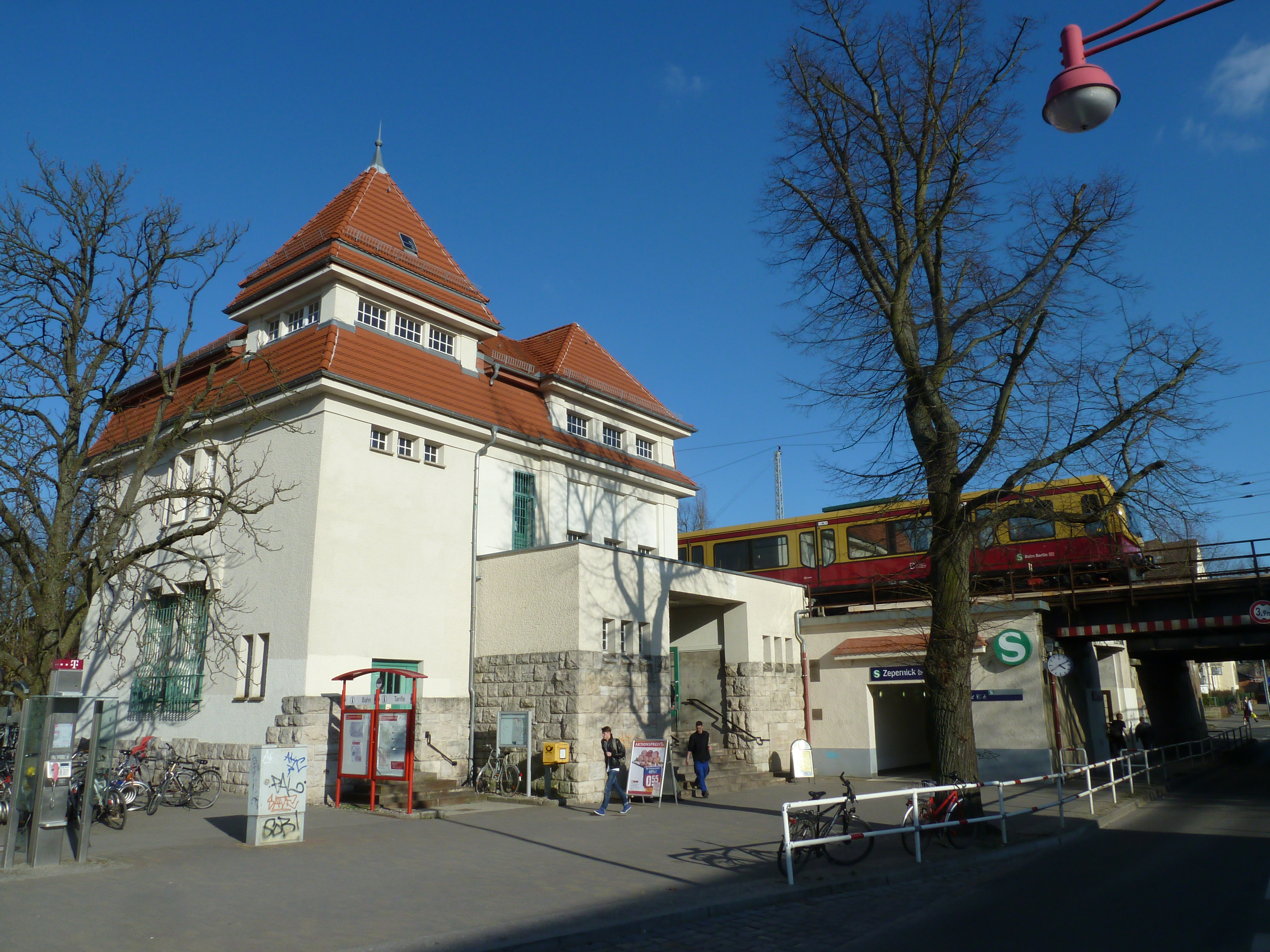
- Zepernick station, 2012

General information
- Location: Panketal, Zepernick, Brandenburg; Germany
- Owner: DB Netz
- Operator: DB Station&Service
- Line: Berlin–Szczecin railway
- Platforms: 1 island platform
- Tracks: 2
- Train operators: S-Bahn Berlin
- Connections: S2

Other information
- Station code: 6998
- DS100 code: BZEP
- Category: 4
- Fare zone: VBB: Berlin C/5257
- Website: www.bahnhof.de

Services
Preceding station	Berlin S-Bahn	Following station
Bernau-Friedenstal towards Bernau	S2	Röntgental towards Blankenfelde
Location

Zepernick (in German Bahnhof Zepernick) is a railway station in the village of Zepernick, Germany, part of the municipality of Panketal. It is served by the Berlin S-Bahn and a local bus line.
