= Culture in Berlin =

Overview of the culture of Berlin

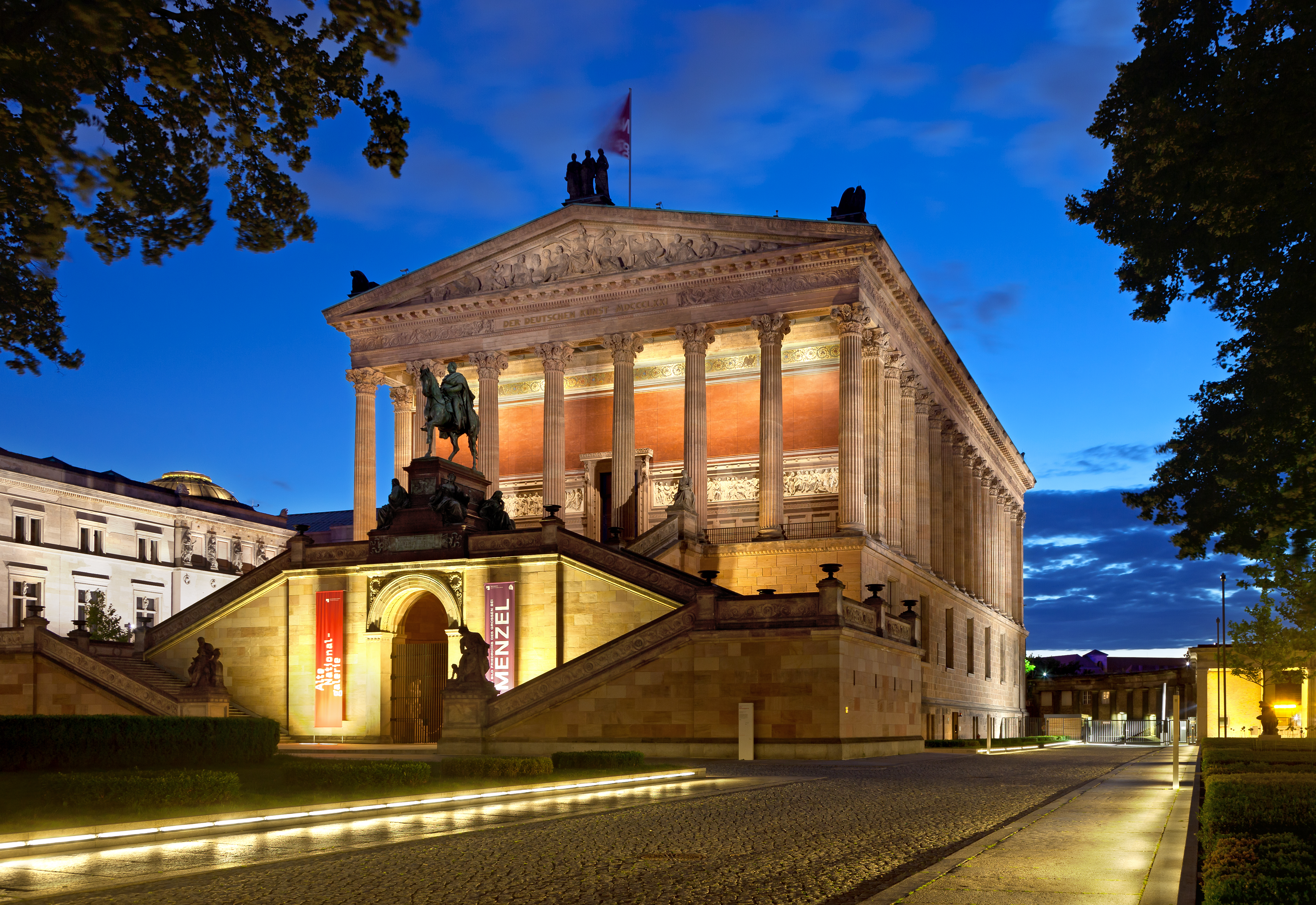
The Alte Nationalgalerie is part of the Museum Island, a UNESCO World Heritage Site.

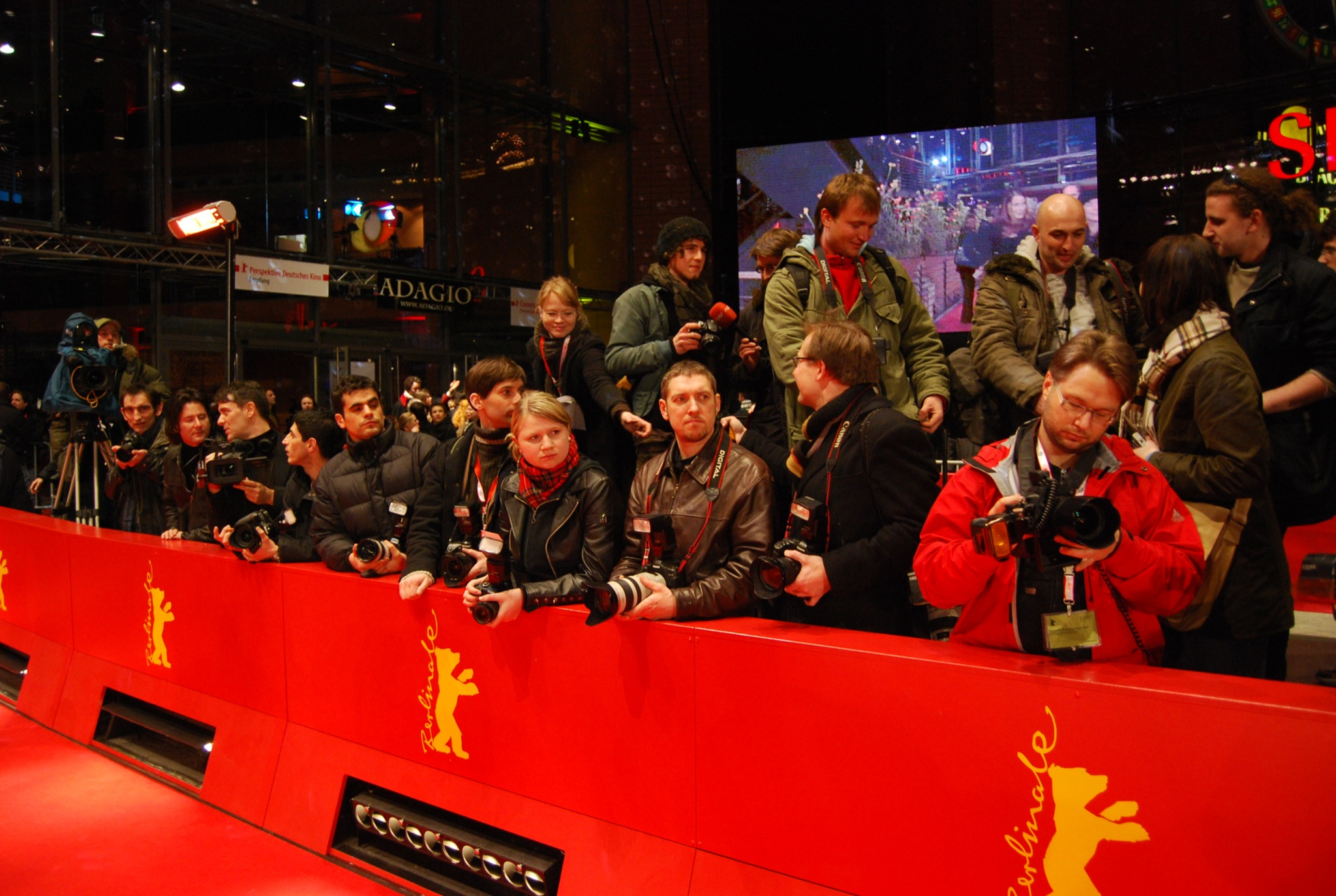
The Berlinale is considered to be the largest spectator film festival in the world.

Berlin is recognized as a world city of culture and creative industries. Numerous cultural institutions, many of which enjoy international reputation are representing the diverse heritage of the city. Many young people, cultural entrepreneurs and international artists continue to settle in the city. Berlin has established itself as a popular nightlife and entertainment center in Europe.

The expanding cultural role of Berlin was underscored by the relocation of several entertainment companies after 2000 who decided to move their headquarters and main studios to the banks of the River Spree. The city has a very diverse art scene and is home to over 300 art galleries. In 2005, Berlin was awarded the title "City of Design" by UNESCO.

== Creative industries ==
Berlin is an important center of the European and German film industry. It is home to more than 1000 film and television production companies and 270 movie theaters. Also, 300 national and international co-productions are filmed in the region every year. The historic Babelsberg Studios and the production company UFA are located outside Berlin in Potsdam. The city is also home of the European Film Academy and the German Film Academy, and hosts the annual Berlin International Film Festival. Founded in 1951, the festival has been celebrated annually in February since 1978. With over 430,000 admissions it is the largest publicly attended film festival in the world.

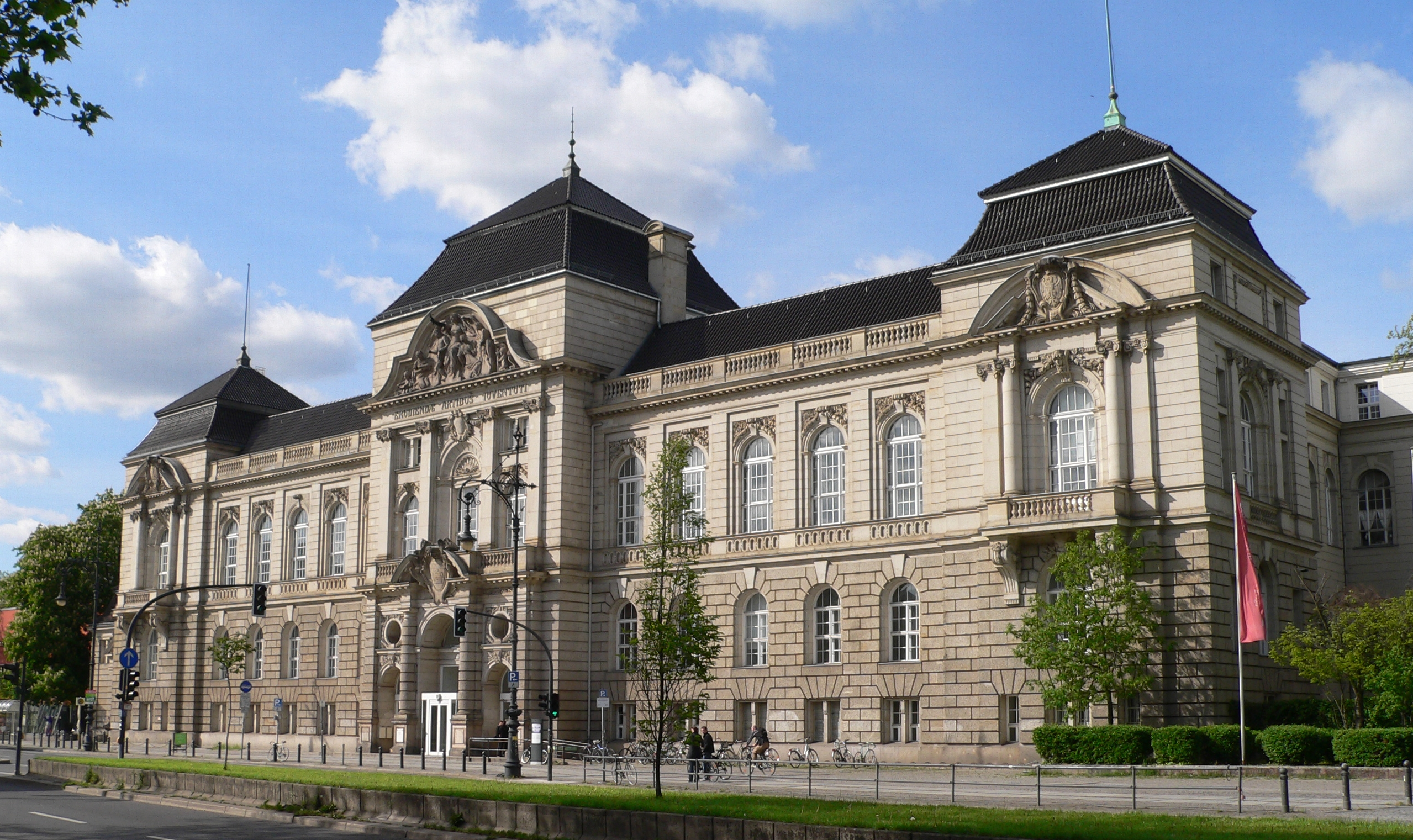
University of Arts

Berlin is home to many international and regional television and radio stations. The public broadcaster RBB has its headquarters in Berlin as well as the commercial broadcasters Welt. German international public broadcaster Deutsche Welle has its TV production unit in Berlin, and most national German broadcasters have a studio in the city.

Berlin has Germany's largest number of daily newspapers, with numerous local broadsheets (Berliner Morgenpost, Berliner Zeitung, Der Tagesspiegel), and three major tabloids, as well as national dailies of varying sizes, each with a different political affiliation, such as Die Welt, Junge Welt, Neues Deutschland, and Die Tageszeitung. The Exberliner, a monthly magazine, is Berlin's English-language periodical focusing on arts and entertainment. Berlin is also the headquarters of the two major German-language publishing houses Walter de Gruyter and Springer, each of which publish books, periodicals, and multimedia products.

Industries that do business in the creative arts and entertainment are an important and sizable sector of the economy of Berlin. The creative arts sector comprises music, film, advertising, architecture, art, design, fashion, performing arts, publishing, R&D, software, TV, radio, and video games. Around 22,600 creative enterprises, predominantly SMEs, generated over 18.6 billion Euro in total revenue. Berlin's creative industries have contributed an estimated 20% of Berlin's gross domestic product in 2005.

== Nightlife and festivals ==
French Cathedral at the Festival of Lights (Berlin)

Berlin's nightlife has been described as one of the most diverse and vibrant of its kind. Throughout the 1990s, people in their twenties moved to the city with its affordable rents and made Berlin's club scene one of the premier nightlife destinations of Europe. After the fall of the Berlin Wall in 1989, many historic buildings in Mitte, the former city center of East Berlin, as well as in the neighboring locality of Prenzlauer Berg, were illegally occupied and re-built by young squatters and became a fertile ground for underground and counterculture gatherings. Since the early 1990s, Mitte and the eastern borough of Friedrichshain have been the home to many nightclubs, including techno clubs such as Tresor, E-Werk, KitKatClub or Berghain, some of which became known for the length of their parties.

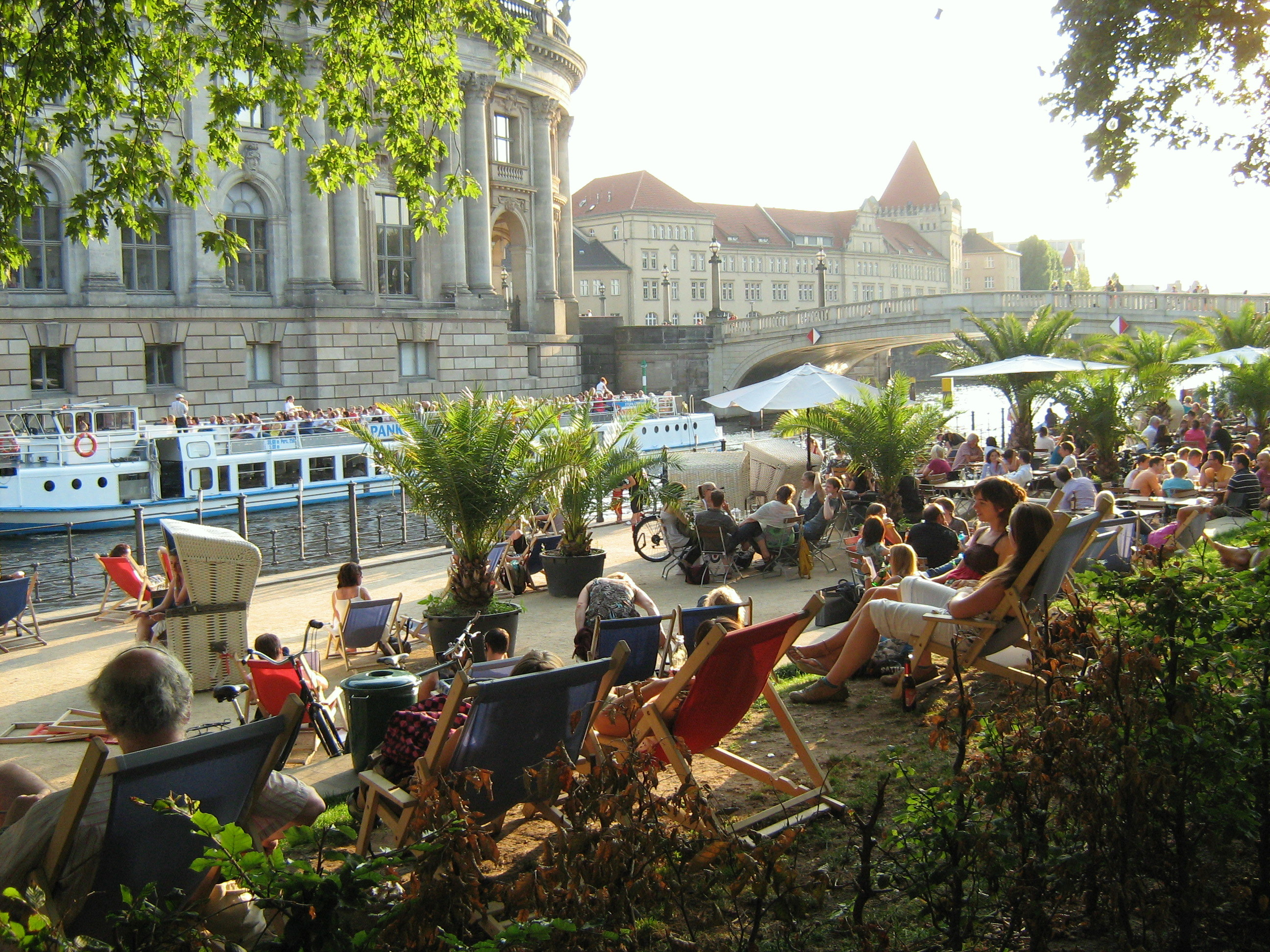
Beach along the Spree river

In the western part of the city, the former West Berlin, SOUND, located from 1971 to 1988 in Tiergarten and today in Charlottenburg, gained notoriety in the late 1970s for its popularity with heroin users and other drug addicts as described in Christiane F.'s book Zoo Station: The Story of Christiane F. The SO36 in Kreuzberg originally focused largely on punk music, but today has become a popular venue for many dances and parties. The LaBelle discothèque in Friedenau became widely known as the location of the 1986 Berlin discotheque bombing. Linientreu, another nightclub of the 1980s and 1990s, was located near the Kaiser Wilhelm Memorial Church.

The Karneval der Kulturen, a multi-ethnic street parade celebrated every Pentecost weekend, and the Christopher Street Day are both supported by the city's government. Berlin is also well known for the cultural festival, Berliner Festspiele, which include the jazz festival JazzFest Berlin. Several technology and media art festivals and conferences are held in the city, including Transmediale and Chaos Communication Congress.

Berlin has a long history of gay culture and influence on popular entertainment, and according to some authors, in the 1920s the city was the Gay Capital of Europe. Today, the city has a huge number of gay clubs and festivals, such as Easter Fetish Week (Easter in Berlin), Christopher Street Day (Berlin Pride)—central Europe's largest gay-lesbian pride event celebrated on the last weekend of June—Folsom Europe and Hustlaball. Berlin is also leading Europe in the number of fetish clubs. "Easter in Berlin" and "Folsom Europe Berlin" are the biggest gay fetish festivals in Europe. Annual gay highlights in Berlin are also the gay and lesbian street festival in Berlin-Schöneberg (Lesbisch-schwules Stadtfest) and Kreuzberg Pride in June. The largest gay areas in Berlin are in Schöneberg close to Nollendorfplatz and in Prenzlauer Berg at the Schönhauser Allee subway station.

The "Down Under Berlin – Australian Film Festival" was founded in Berlin in 2011 as an event dedicated to the presentation of Australian and New Zealand film. The diverse festival, which is Europe's largest film festival on the film work of the two largest nations of the Australasia region, was held at Kreuzberg's "Moviemento" cinema in 2014. In 2015, Berlin will be the first host of the Lollapalooza festival in Europe.

== Museums and galleries ==
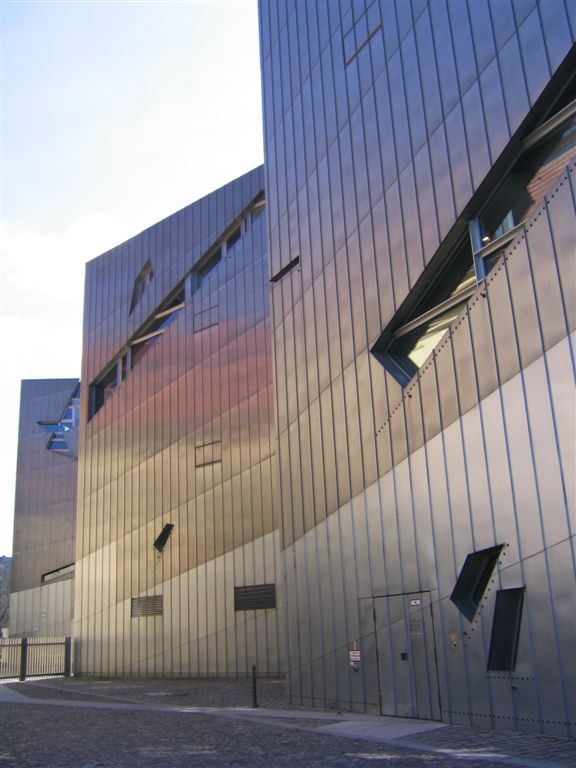
The Jewish Museum presents an exhibition on two millennia of German–Jewish history.

Berlin is currently at the leading edge of the global contemporary art scene. There are over 600 art galleries in the city. It is estimated that 6,000 to 7,000 artists live in the city, with a quarter of them being from outside Germany. The beginnings of the modern boom in Berlin's art scene were during the 1990s. In 1995, a Berlin art fair, Art Forum Berlin, was first held. The Berlin Biennale for contemporary artists, held every June, began in 1998. Galleries have grown steadily in number since then. Galleries and artists' residences are mostly found in the neighbourhoods in Mitte (particularly along Auguststraße), Kreuzberg, Wedding, and Charlottenburg.

Berlin is home to 153 museums. The ensemble on the Museum Island is a UNESCO World Heritage Site and is situated in the northern part of the Spree Island between the Spree and the Kupfergraben. As early as 1841, it was designated a "district dedicated to art and antiquities" by royal decree. Subsequently, the Altes Museum (Old Museum) in the Lustgarten displaying the bust of Queen Nefertiti, the Neues Museum (New Museum), Alte Nationalgalerie (Old National Gallery), Pergamon Museum, and Bode Museum were built there. While these buildings once housed distinct collections, the names of the buildings no longer necessarily correspond to the names of their collections.

Apart from the Museum Island, there are many additional museums in the city. The Gemäldegalerie (Painting Gallery) focuses on the paintings of the Old Masters from the 13th to the 18th centuries, while the Neue Nationalgalerie (New National Gallery, built by Ludwig Mies van der Rohe) specializes in 20th century European painting. The Hamburger Bahnhof, located in Moabit, exhibits a major collection of modern and contemporary art. In spring 2006, the expanded Deutsches Historisches Museum re-opened in the Zeughaus with an overview of German history through the fall of the Berlin Wall in 1989. The Bauhaus Archive is an architecture museum.

Berlin also hosts several institutions dedicated to photography and lens-based media. These include the Helmut Newton Foundation, which focuses on fashion, portrait, and documentary photography, and the Museum für Fotografie, which houses collections related to photographic history and practice. In the Charlottenburg district, C/O Berlin presents rotating exhibitions of international photography and visual media. In 2023, Fotografiska opened a major exhibition venue at Kunsthaus Tacheles, further strengthening Berlin’s position as an international centre for photographic culture.

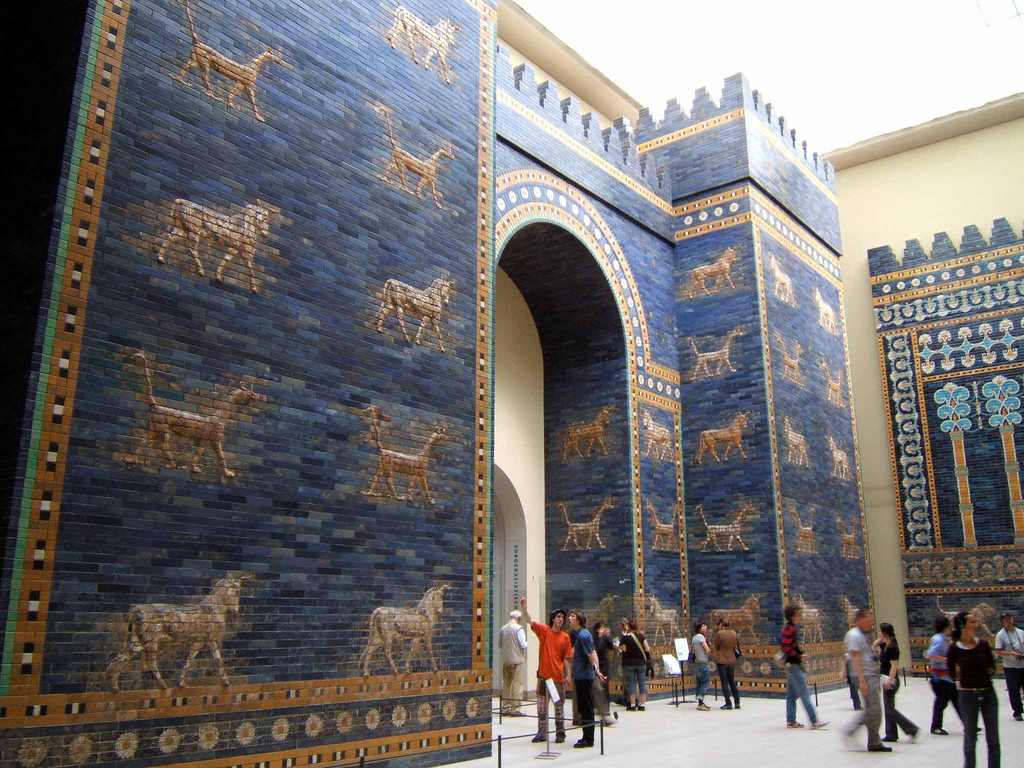
The reconstructed Ishtar Gate of Babylon at the Pergamon Museum

The Jewish Museum has a standing exhibition on two millennia of German-Jewish history. The German Museum of Technology in Kreuzberg has a large collection of historical technical artifacts. The Museum für Naturkunde exhibits natural history near Berlin Hauptbahnhof. It has the largest mounted dinosaur in the world (a brachiosaurus), and a preserved specimen of the early bird Archaeopteryx.

In Dahlem, there are several museums of world art and culture, such as the Museum of Asian Art, the Ethnological Museum, the Museum of European Cultures, as well as the Allied Museum (a museum of the Cold War) and the Brücke Museum (an art museum). In Lichtenberg, on the grounds of the former East German Ministry for State Security (Stasi), is the Stasi Museum. The site of Checkpoint Charlie, one of the most renowned crossing points of the Berlin Wall, is still preserved and also has a museum, a private venture which exhibits comprehensive documentation of detailed plans and strategies devised by people who tried to flee from the East. The Beate Uhse Erotic Museum near Zoo Station claims to be the world's largest erotic museum.

== Performing arts ==
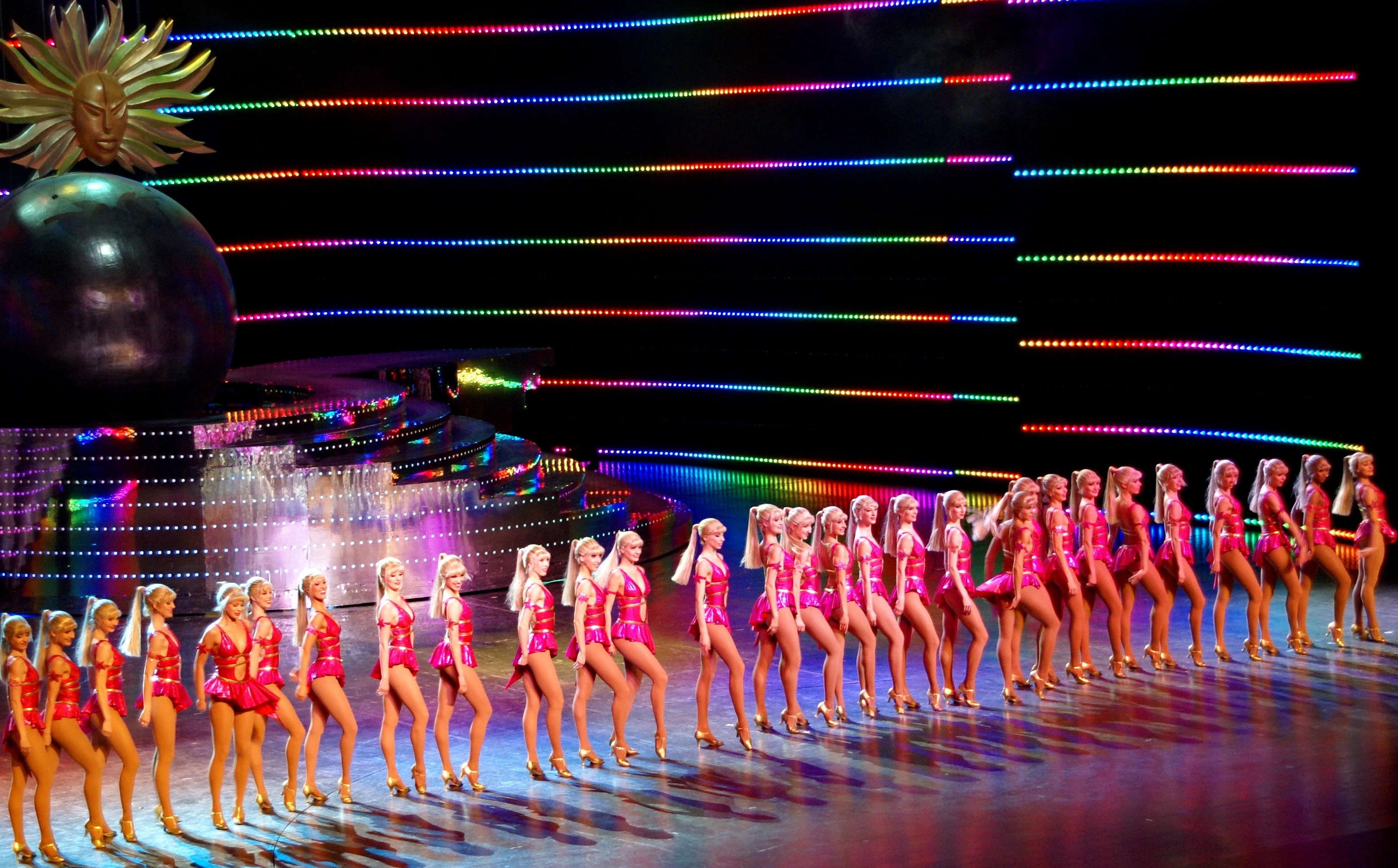
Dancers at the Friedrichstadtpalast

Berlin has evolved and earned its reputation as a leading European city with its high art scene and dynamic, cutting-edge performances. Berlin is home to more than 50 theaters. The Deutsches Theater in Mitte was built in 1849–50 and has operated continuously since then, except for a one-year break (1944–45) due to the Second World War. The Volksbühne at Rosa Luxemburg Platz was built in 1913–14, though the company had been founded in 1890. The Berliner Ensemble, famous for performing the works of Bertolt Brecht, was established in 1949, not far from the Deutsches Theater. The Schaubühne was founded in 1962 in a building in Kreuzberg, but in 1981 moved to the building of the former Universum Cinema on Kurfürstendamm. With a seating capacity of 1,895 and a stage floor of 2,854 square metres (30,720 square feet), the Friedrichstadt-Palast in Berlin Mitte is the largest show palace in Europe.

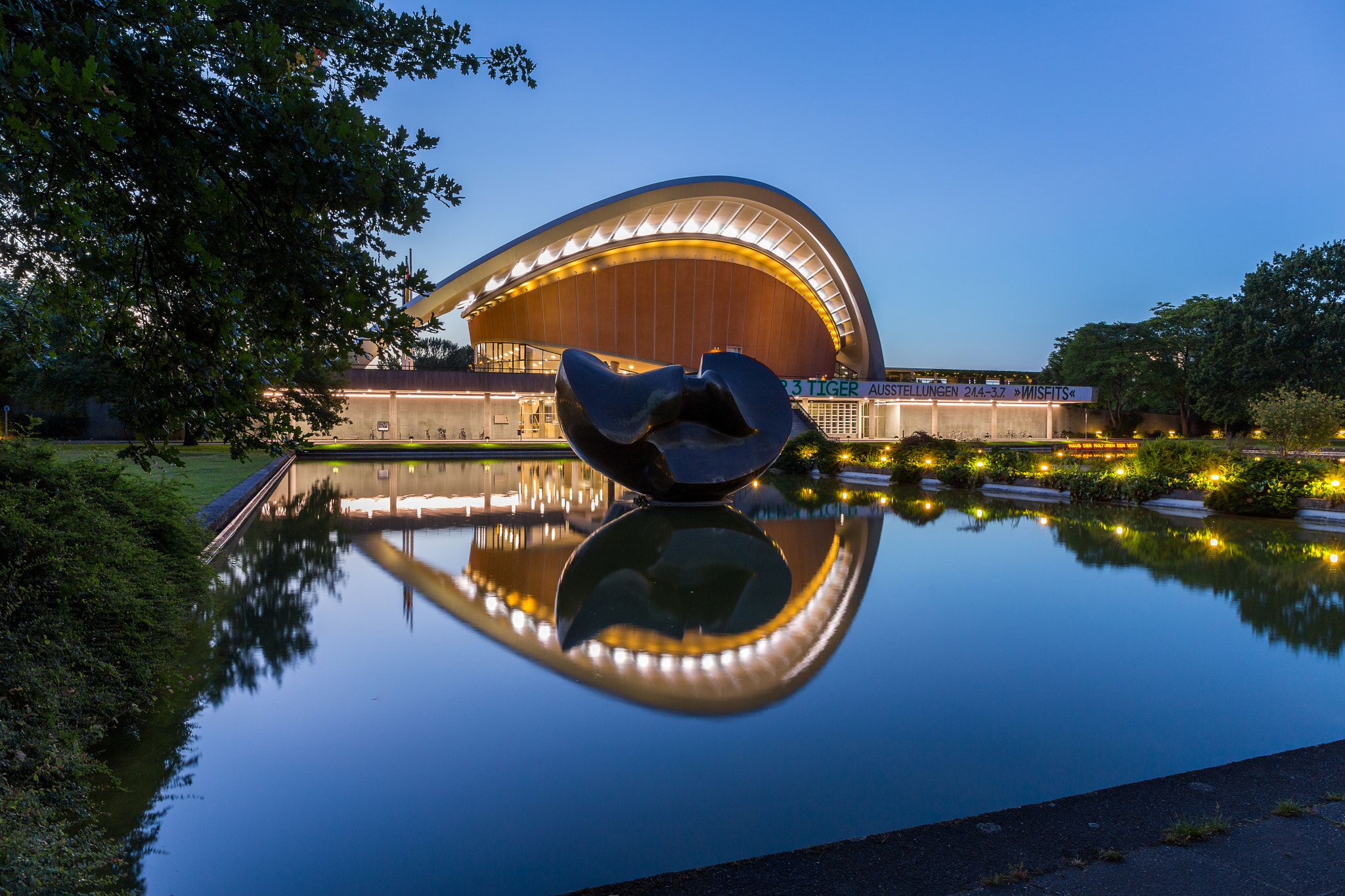
Haus der Kulturen der Welt

Berlin has three major opera houses: the Deutsche Oper, the Berlin State Opera, and the Komische Oper. The Berlin State Opera on Unter den Linden opened in 1742 and is the oldest of the three. Its current musical director is Daniel Barenboim. The Komische Oper has traditionally specialized in operettas and is located at Unter den Linden as well. The Deutsche Oper opened in 1912 in Charlottenburg. During the division of the city from 1961 to 1989 it was the only major opera house in West Berlin.

There are seven symphony orchestras in Berlin. The Berlin Philharmonic Orchestra is one of the preeminent orchestras in the world; it is housed in the Berliner Philharmonie near Potsdamer Platz on a street named for the orchestra's longest-serving conductor, Herbert von Karajan. The current principal conductor is Simon Rattle. The Konzerthausorchester Berlin was founded in 1952 as the orchestra for East Berlin, since the Philharmonic was based in West Berlin. Its current principal conductor is Lothar Zagrosek. The Haus der Kulturen der Welt presents various exhibitions dealing with intercultural issues and stages world music and conferences.

Many new music and performance venues emerged in Berlin in the aftermath of the fall of the Berlin wall. Among these venues, locations such as ausland and KuLe are now renowned for presenting experimental and improvised music. The city of Berlin has developed into an international hub for experimental music and art, and this forms a core element of the programming of festivals such as transmediale and CTM Festival.

== Architecture ==
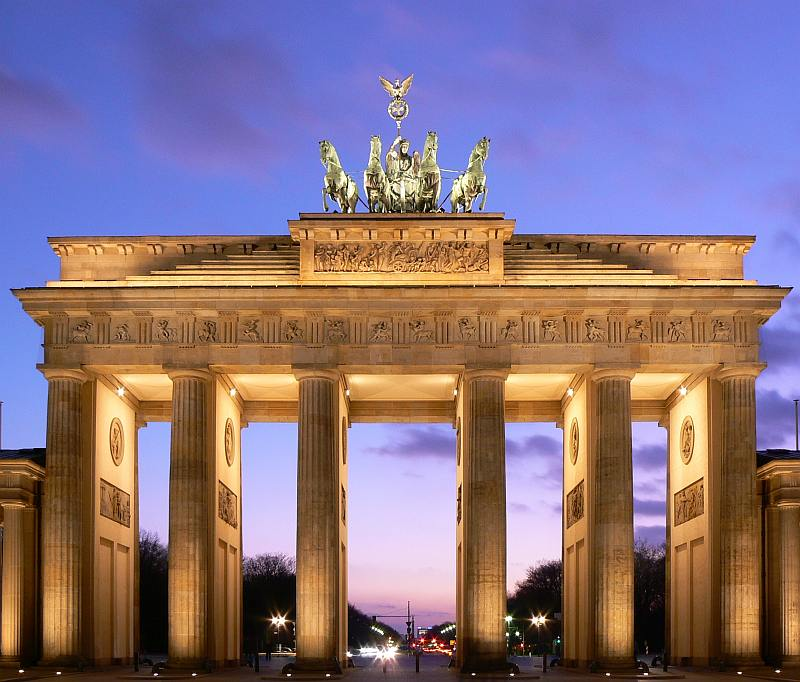
Brandenburg Gate

Berlin's architecture combines elements from almost all periods and all styles. Emblematic of Berlin, the Brandenburg Gate is a landmark in the city. There the world-famous boulevard Unter den Linden begins. Walking along and making small detours from this avenue one can catch a glimpse of the State Opera House, admire the Hedwig's Cathedral or take a closer look at the collections of the Old Museum, which reveal a microcosm of cultural excellence. The boulevard Unter den Linden ends at the Berlin Palace. Berlin landmarks, such as the Gendarmenmarkt and the French and German Cathedral (including the Schauspielhaus), are the highest examples of the city's Classicist architecture.

The list of significant structures goes further with the Sanssouci Palace in Potsdam, where one can find the famous terraces designed by Knobelsdorff, as well as the Neues Palais and Orangerie. From among the numerous monuments of Berlin, one of the most famous is the Schiller statue, which reminds the visitors of the city's powerful literary tradition.

Important collections of art can be found at the monumental Pergamon Museum, whose building resembles an ancient temple. Since the reunification of 1989, visitors can get there by a boat-ride on the Spree River (which passes by the Reichstagsgebäude – government buildings) or on foot, strolling through the historic inner city. Although much of the great art collections of former Berlin suffered the consequences of World War II, many paintings were saved stored in salt mines.

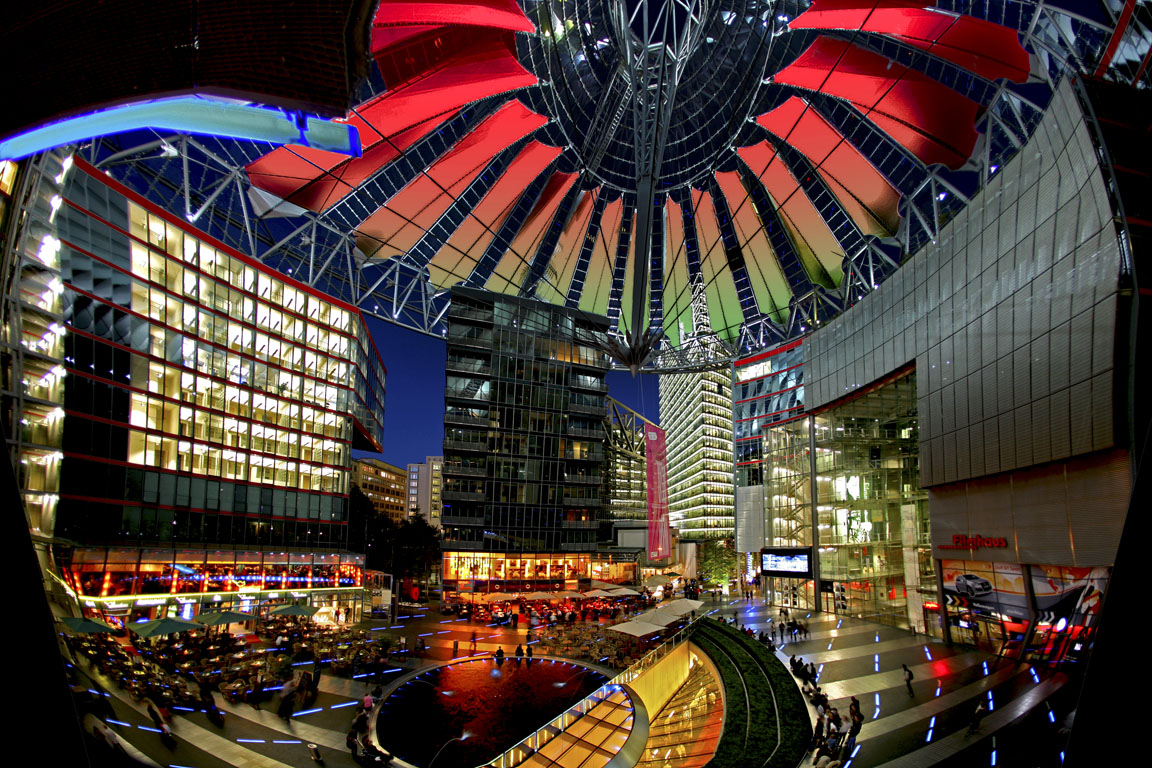
The Sony Center

Some works of art were kept in the eastern part of the country. They include ancient treasures found by German archaeologists in the 19th and early 20th centuries. These treasures were later placed in different museums in Berlin. Charlottenburg Palace, located west of the Tiergarten, has many museum collections and royal rooms. The Schlossgarten Charlottenburg is also known for its beautiful gardens. Another important place is the Mausoleum, where Friedrich Wilhelm II and Queen Louise are buried. It is an important memorial to the history of the Prussian royal family.

Religious heritage is best represented by the 15th-century Gothic Marienkirche, which boasts a compelling image of a Danse Macabre. Industrial Art Nouveau can be seen at the building of Hackesche Hofe, a site laden with fashionable boutiques and art galleries.

The Nikolaiviertel is the place where Medieval and Baroque monuments are situated. In its centre, there is the 13th-century Nikolaikirche, Berlin's oldest church. The building of the Kongresshalle, as well as the Philharmonie, where the world-famous Berlin Philharmonic Orchestra resides were designed according to the trends of mid-20th-Century architecture. Additionally, the city is thriving with the most modern architectural designs, some of which are lacking structural logic, but nevertheless, Berlin continues to evolve as a unified world metropolis.

== Cuisine ==
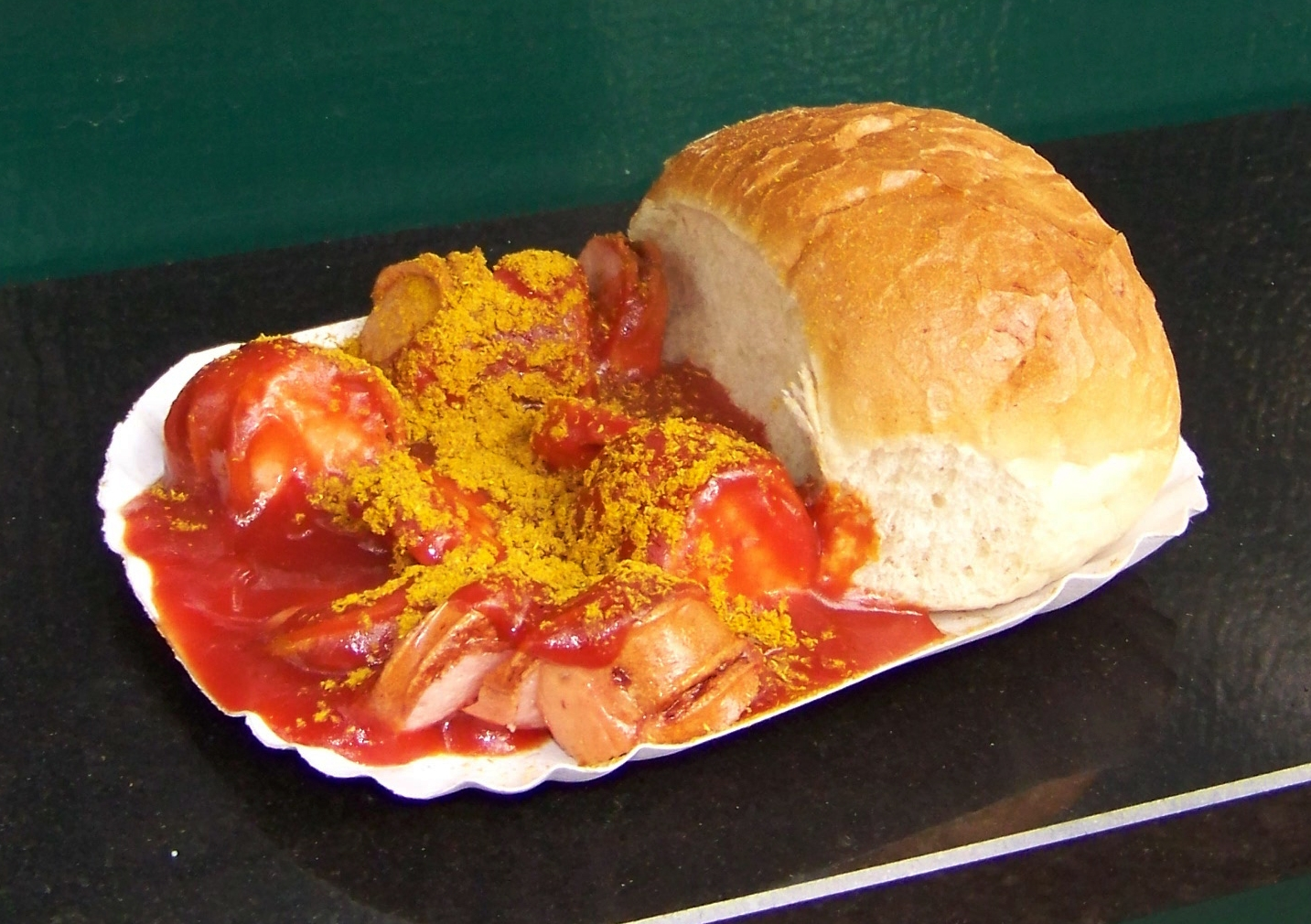
The currywurst was invented in Berlin.

Berlin is home to a diverse gastronomy scene reflecting the immigrant history of the city. Twelve restaurants in Berlin have been included in the Michelin guide, which ranks the city at the top for the number of its restaurants having this distinction in Germany. Apart from that, Berlin is well known for its vast offering of vegetarian, vegan and otherwise sustainability-oriented food, such as fair trade goods or organic food. Berlin is one of the cities with the most vegetarian and vegan restaurants in the world.

Many local foods originated from north-German culinary traditions and include rustic and hearty dishes with pork, goose, fish, peas, beans, cucumbers or potatoes.

Typical Berliner fares include currywurst, invented in 1949, and the Berliner known in Berlin though as a Pfannkuchen.

Turkish and Arab immigrant workers brought their culinary traditions to the city; for example, the döner kebab, falafel and lahmacun, which have become common fast-food staples. The modern fast-food version of the döner was invented in Berlin in 1971.

== Recreation ==
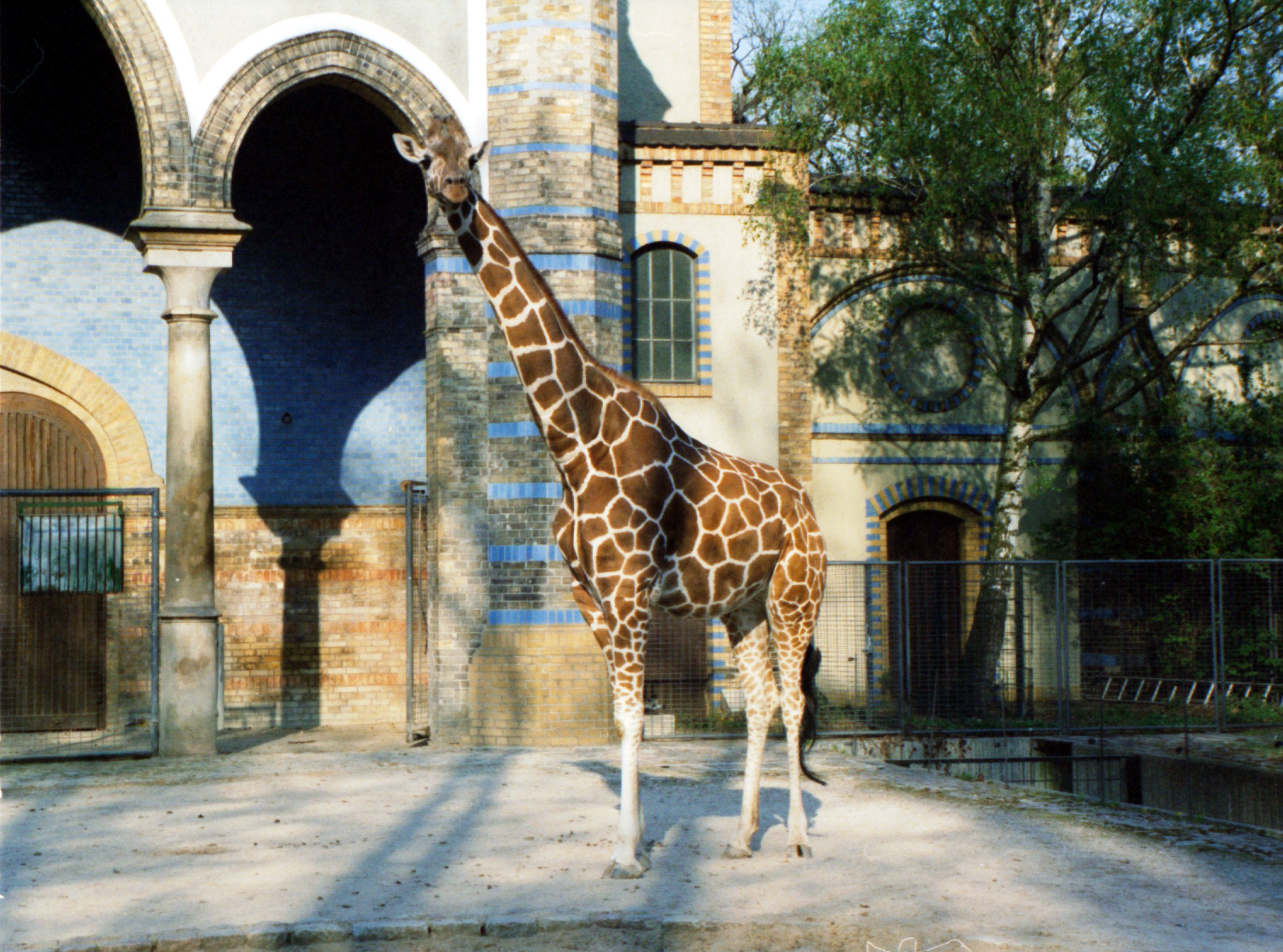
The Zoologischer Garten Berlin is the most visited zoo in Europe and presents the most diverse range of species in the world.

Zoologischer Garten Berlin, the older of two zoos in the city, was founded in 1844, and presents the most diverse range of species in the world. It was the home of the captive-born celebrity polar bear Knut, born in December 2006. The city's other zoo is Tierpark Friedrichsfelde, founded in 1955 on the grounds of Schloss Friedrichsfelde in the Borough of Lichtenberg.

Berlin's Botanischer Garten includes the Botanic Museum Berlin. With an area of 43 hectares (110 acres) and around 22,000 different plant species it is one of the largest and most diverse gardens in the world. Other gardens in the city include the Britzer Garten, site of the 1985 Bundesgartenschau, and the Erholungspark Marzahn, promoted under the name Gardens of the world.

The Tiergarten is Berlin's largest park located in Mitte and was designed by Peter Joseph Lenné. In Kreuzberg the Viktoriapark provides a good viewing point over the southern part of inner city Berlin. Treptower Park beside the Spree in Treptow has a monument honoring the Soviet soldiers killed in the 1945 Battle of Berlin. The Volkspark in Friedrichshain, which opened in 1848, is the oldest park in the city. Its summit is man-made and covers a Second World War bunker and rubble from the ruins of the city; at its foot is Germany's main memorial to Polish soldiers.

Berlin is known for its numerous beach bars along the river Spree. Together with the countless cafés, restaurants and green spaces in all districts, they create an important source of recreation and leisure time.

== Sports ==
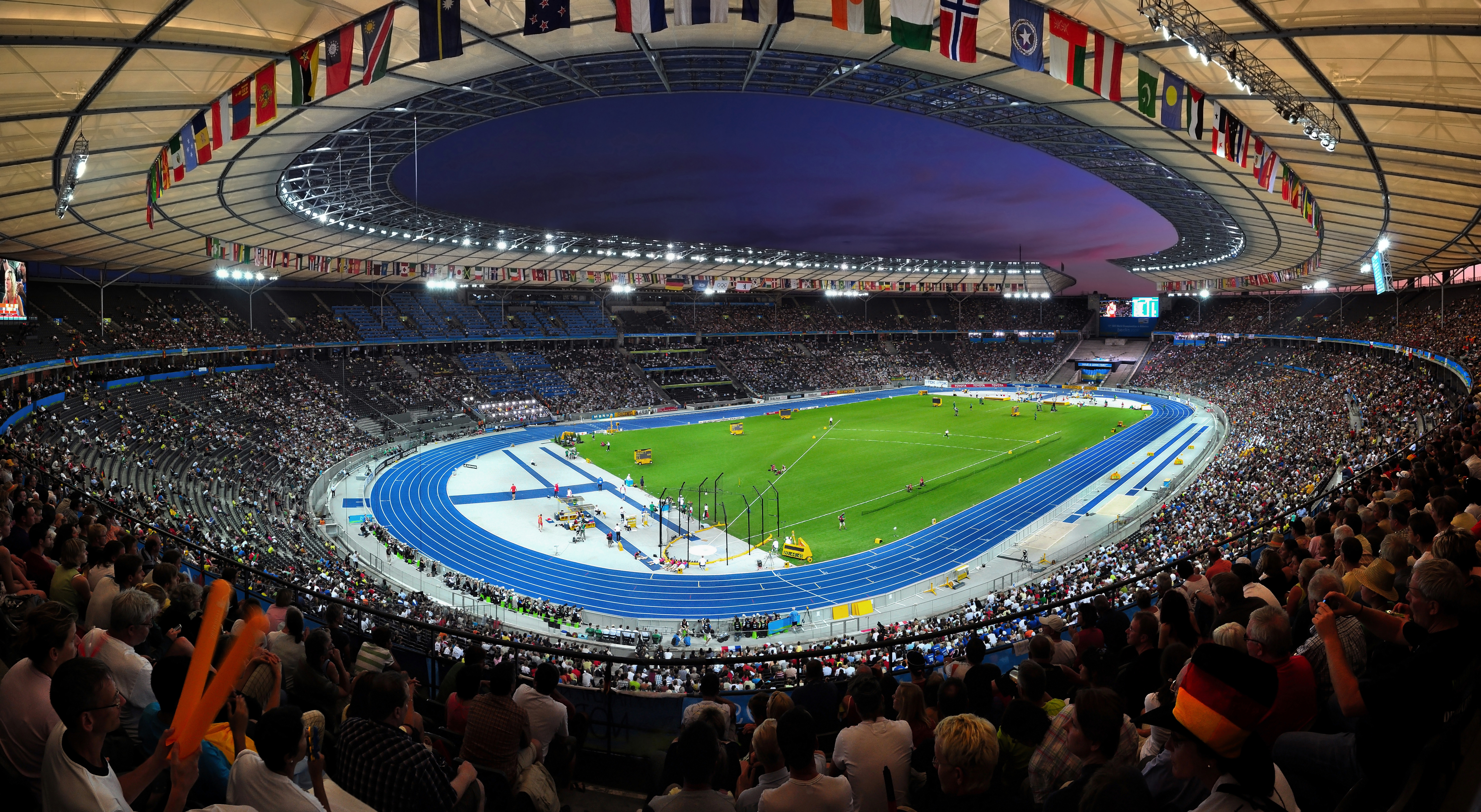
The Olympiastadion hosted the 1936 Summer Olympics and the 2006 FIFA World Cup final.

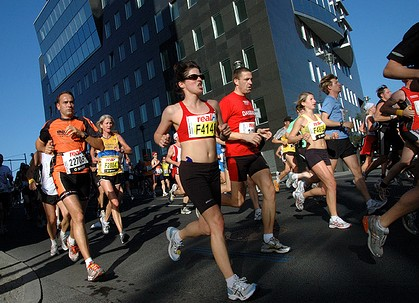
The annual Berlin Marathon is known as a fast course.

Berlin has established a high-profile reputation as a host city of international sporting events. Berlin hosted the 1936 Olympics and was the host city for the 2006 FIFA World Cup Final. The IAAF World Championships in Athletics were held in the Olympiastadion in August 2009. The annual Berlin Marathon and the annual ÅF Golden League event ISTAF for athletics are also held here. The FIVB World Tour has chosen an inner-city site near Alexanderplatz to present a beach volleyball Grand Slam every year.

Open Air gatherings of several hundred thousands spectators have become popular during international football competitions, like the World Cup or the UEFA European Football Championship. Many fans and viewers gather to watch the matches on huge video screens. The event is known as the Fan Mile and takes place at the Brandenburg Gate every two years.

Several major clubs representing the most popular spectator sports in Germany have their base in Berlin.

Club	Sport	Founded	League	Venue
Hertha BSC	Football	1892	Bundesliga	Olympiastadion
1. FC Union Berlin	Football	1966	Bundesliga	Alte Försterei
ALBA Berlin	Basketball	1991	BBL	Mercedes-Benz Arena (Berlin)
Eisbären Berlin	Ice hockey	1954	DEL	Mercedes-Benz Arena (Berlin)
Füchse Berlin	Handball	1891	HBL	Max-Schmeling-Halle

== Quotations ==
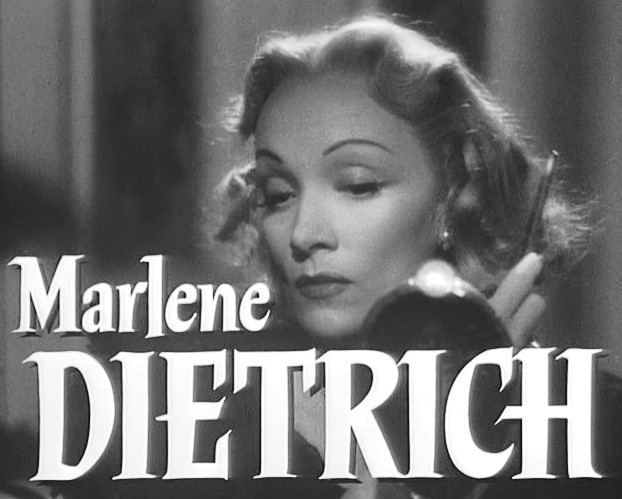
Marlene Dietrich was born in Berlin-Schöneberg.

- "Berlin ist eine Stadt, verdammt dazu, ewig zu werden, niemals zu sein" ("Berlin is a city condemned always to become, never to be.")
  (Karl Scheffler, author of Berlin: Ein Stadtschicksal, 1910)
- "Ich hab noch einen Koffer in Berlin" ("I still have a suitcase in Berlin")
  (Marlene Dietrich, 1951 song by the actress and singer born in Berlin-Schöneberg.)
- "Ich bin ein Berliner". ("I am a citizen of Berlin")
  (John F. Kennedy, President of the United States, 1963 while visiting Berlin)
- "The greatest cultural extravaganza that one could imagine."
  (David Bowie, singer, on 1970s Berlin)
- "Berlin wird leben und die Mauer wird fallen." ("Berlin will live and the wall will fall.")
  (Willy Brandt, Former Governing Mayor of West Berlin and chancellor of Germany, 10 November 1989)
- "Berlin ist arm, aber sexy." ("Berlin is poor, but sexy.")
  (Klaus Wowereit, Governing Mayor, in a press interview, 2003)

== Image gallery ==
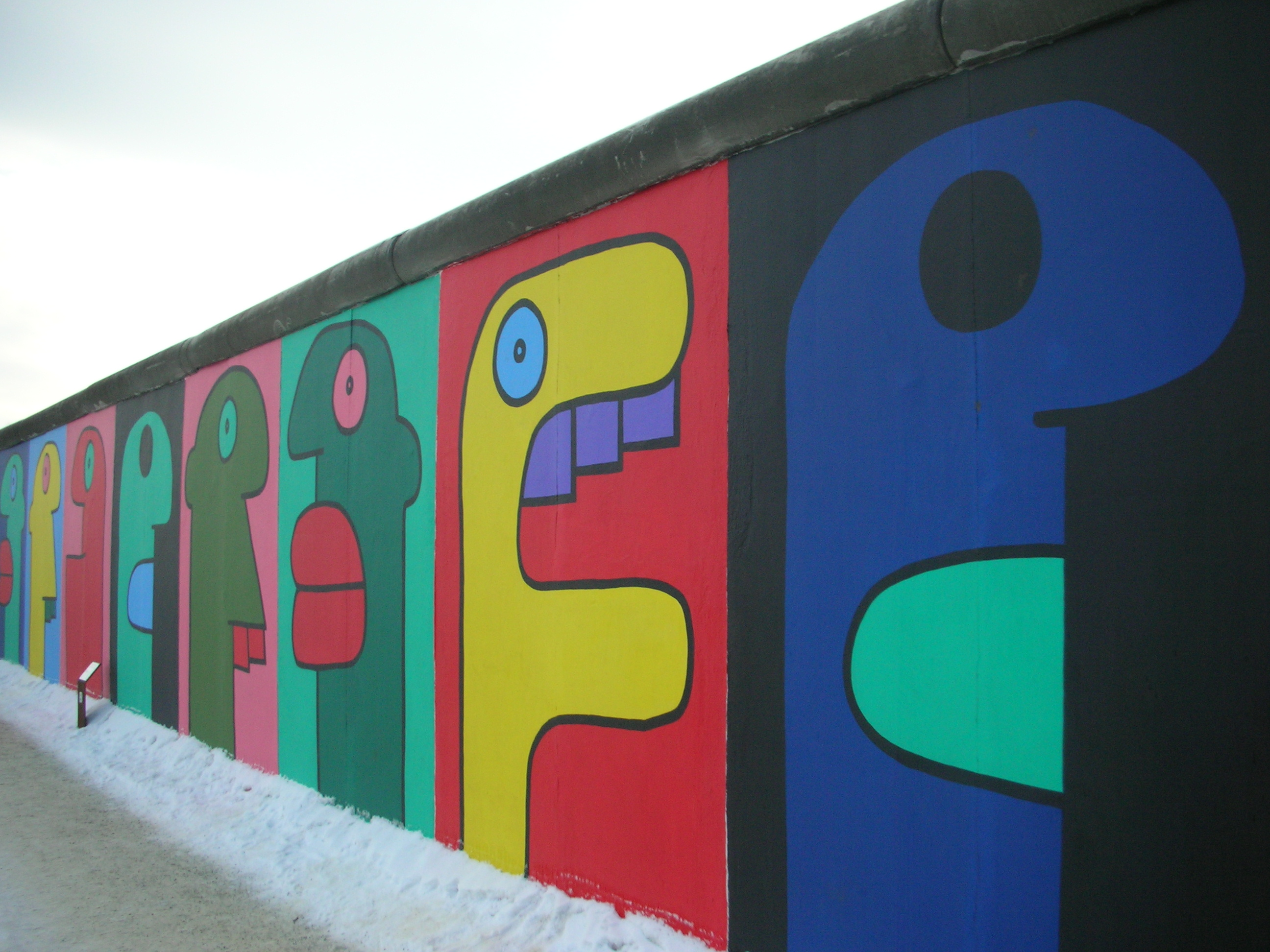
East Side Gallery

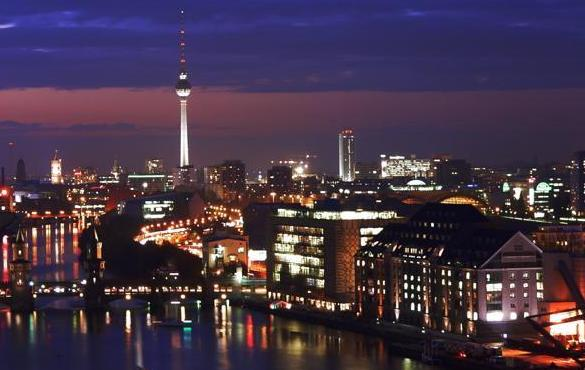
Berlin along the Spree river and the Fernsehturm by night

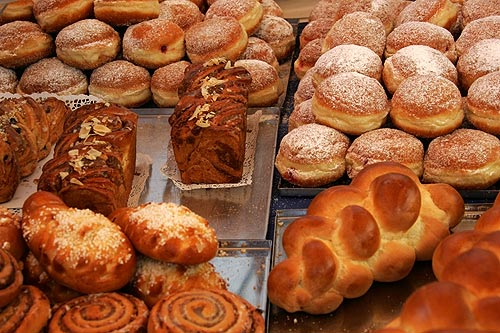
Berliner Pfannkuchen

Reichstag dome _{(inside)}

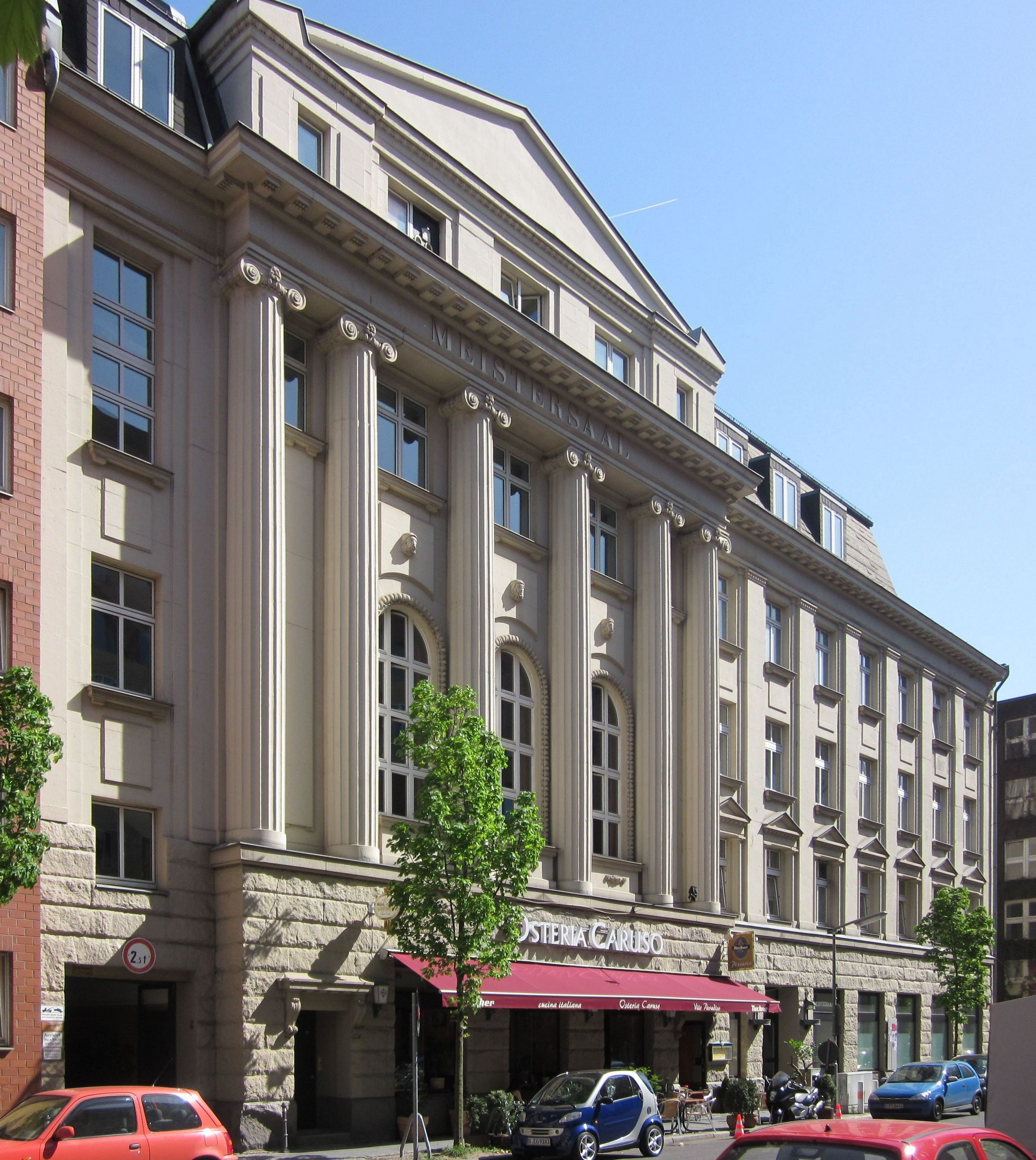
Hansa Studios

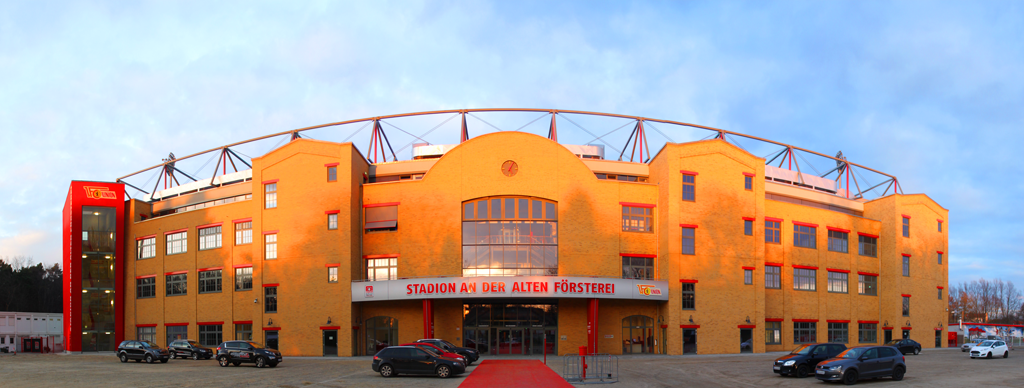
Stadion an der Alten Försterei

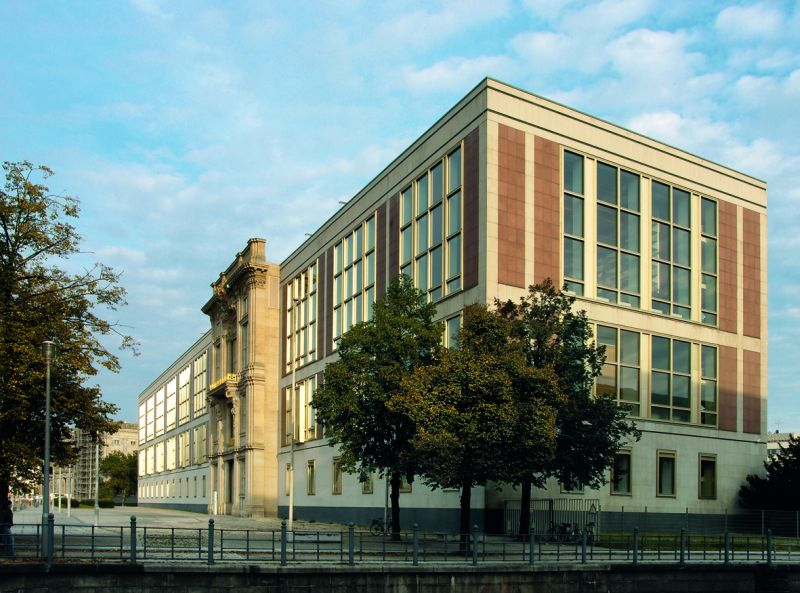
ESMT Berlin

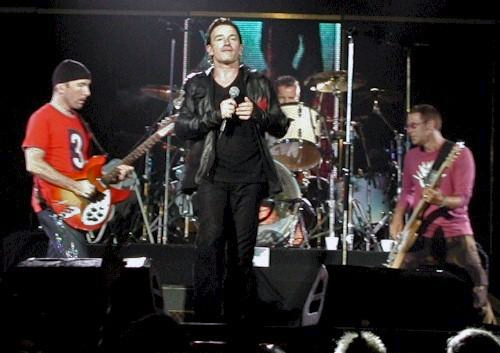
Concert at Waldbühne

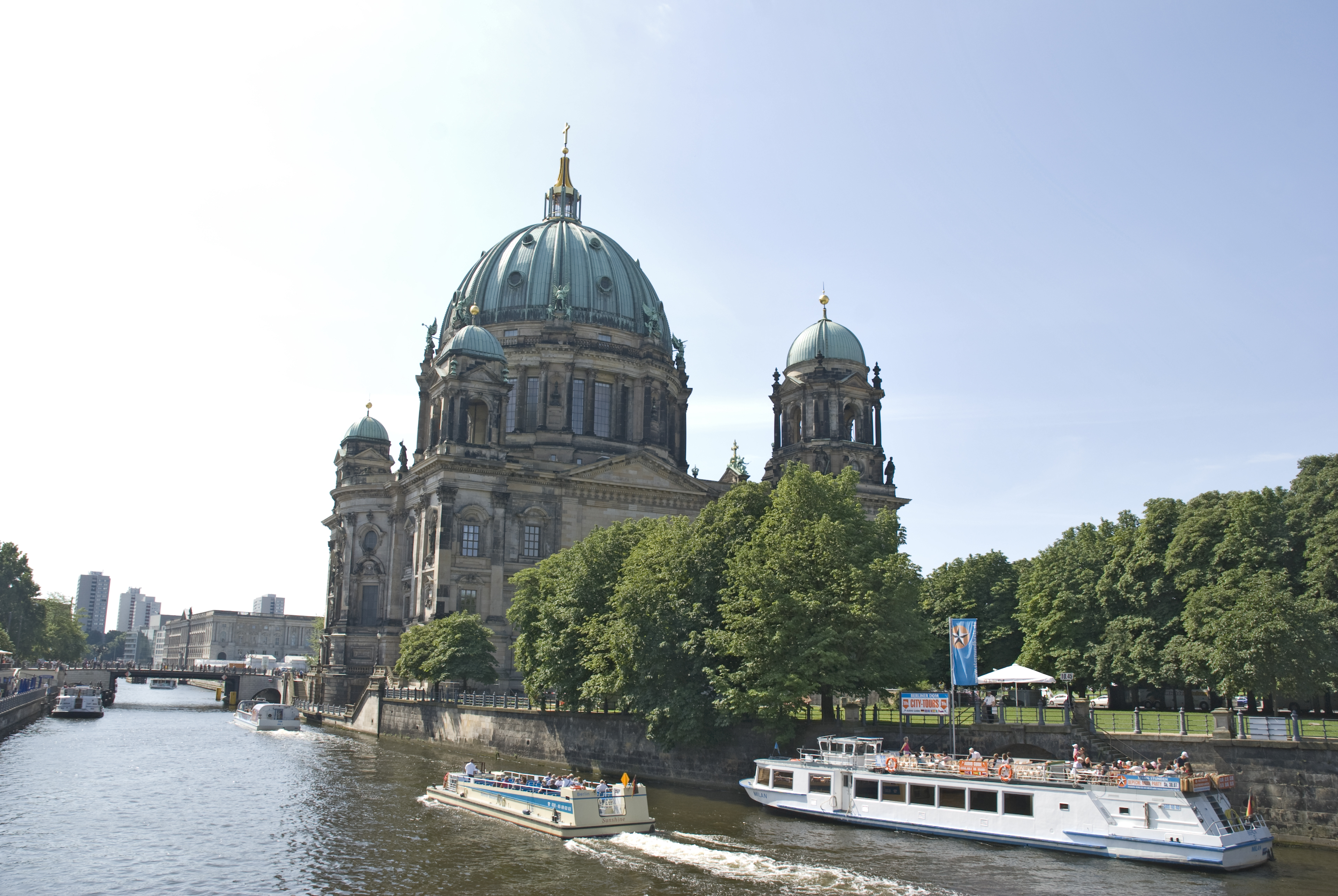
Berlin Cathedral (Dom)

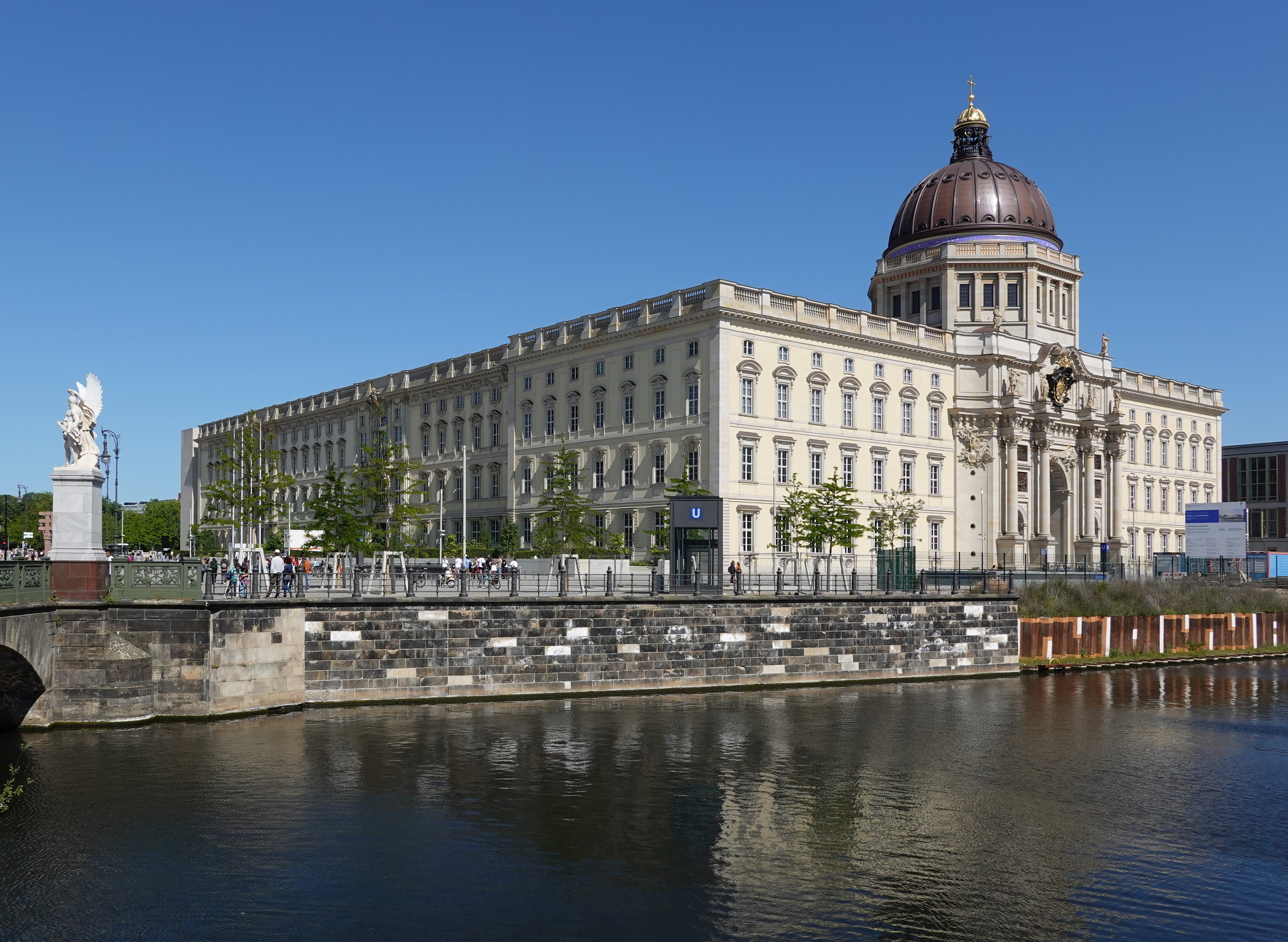
Berlin Palace (Humboldt Forum)

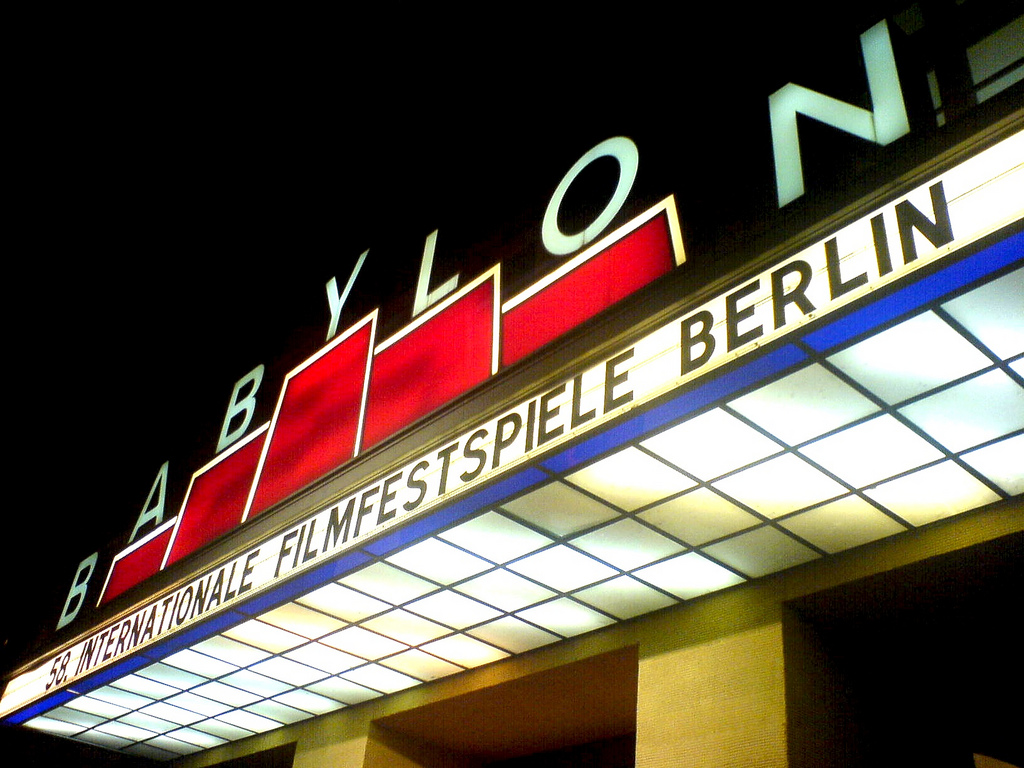
Kino Babylon

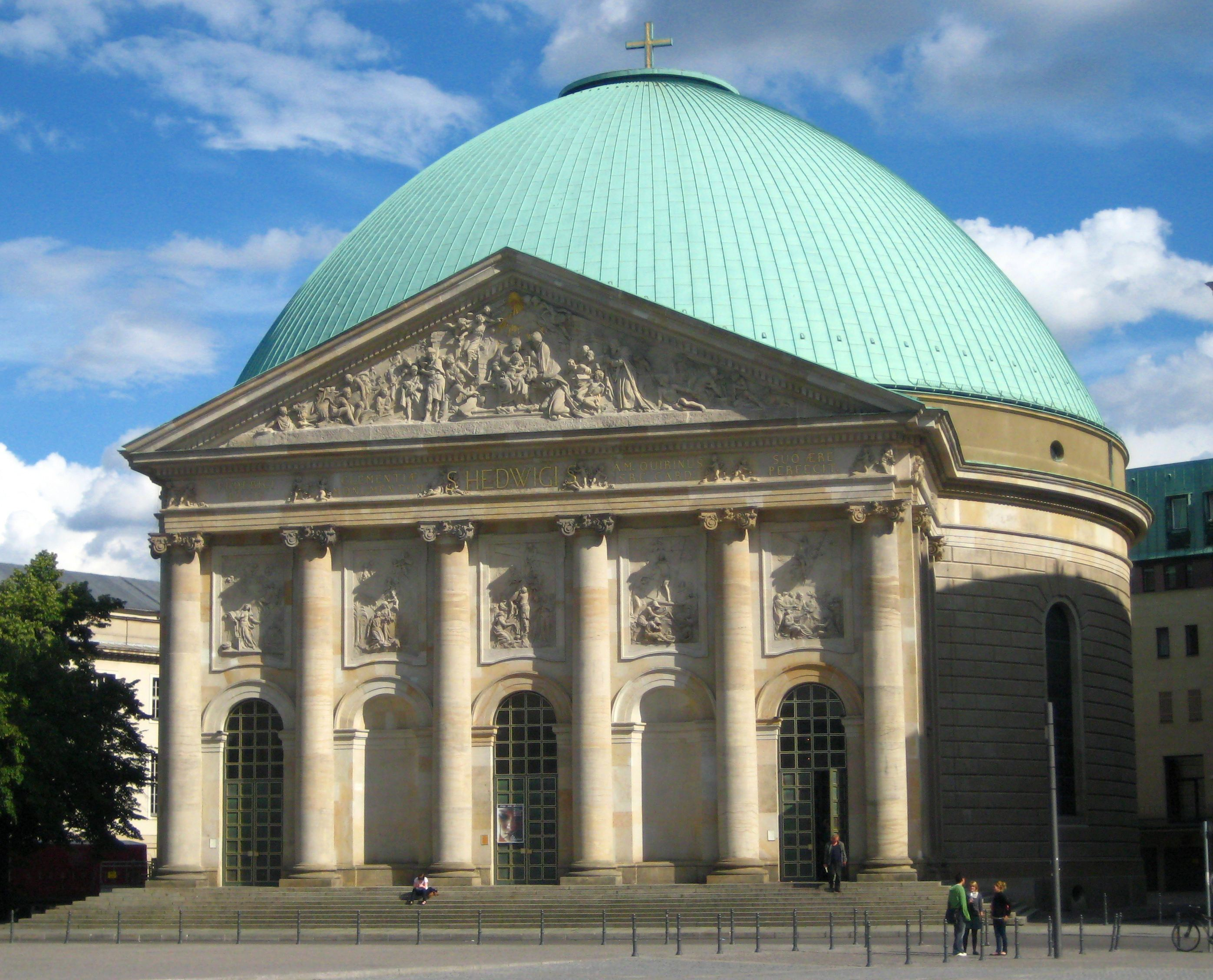
St. Hedwig's Cathedral

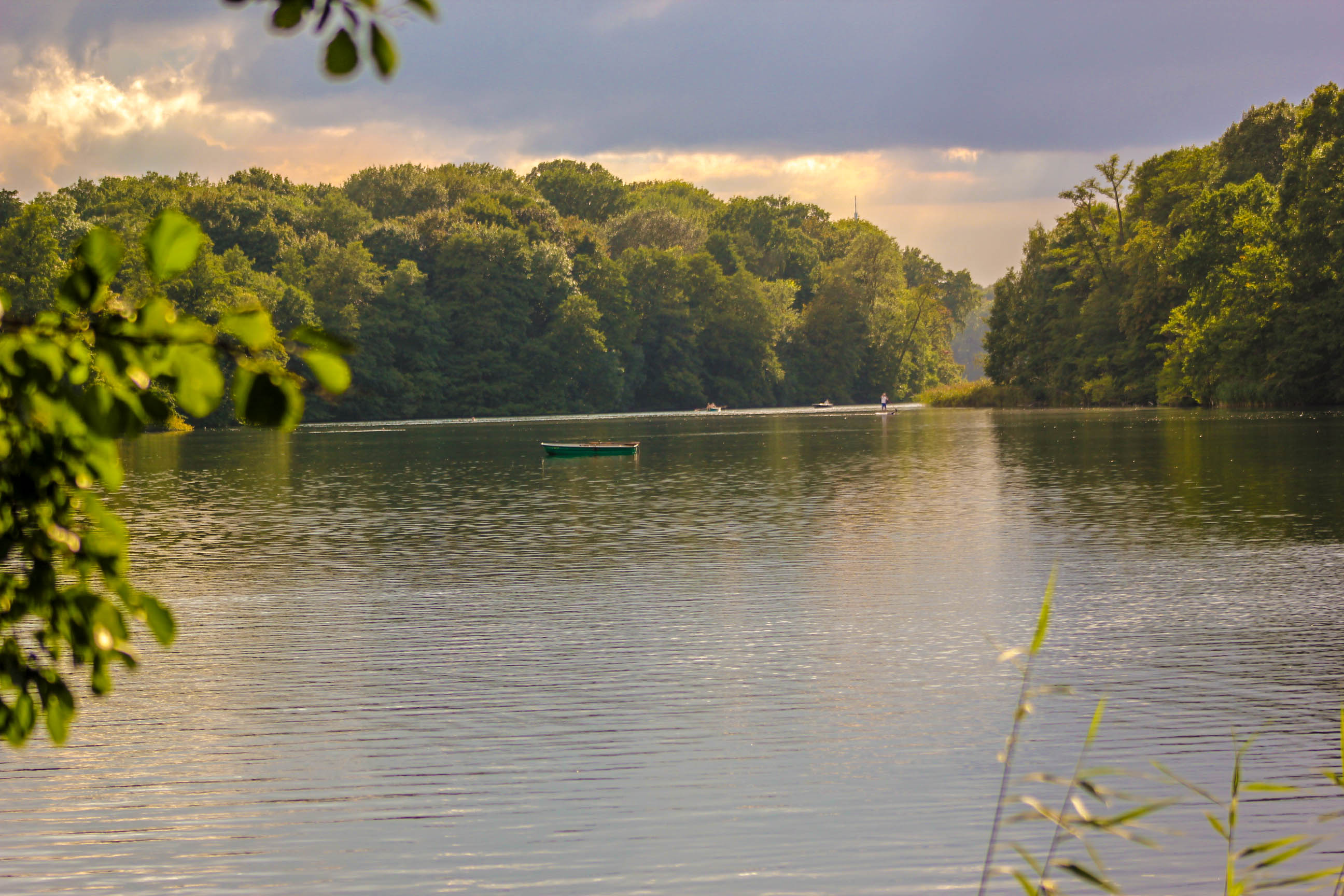
Schlachtensee

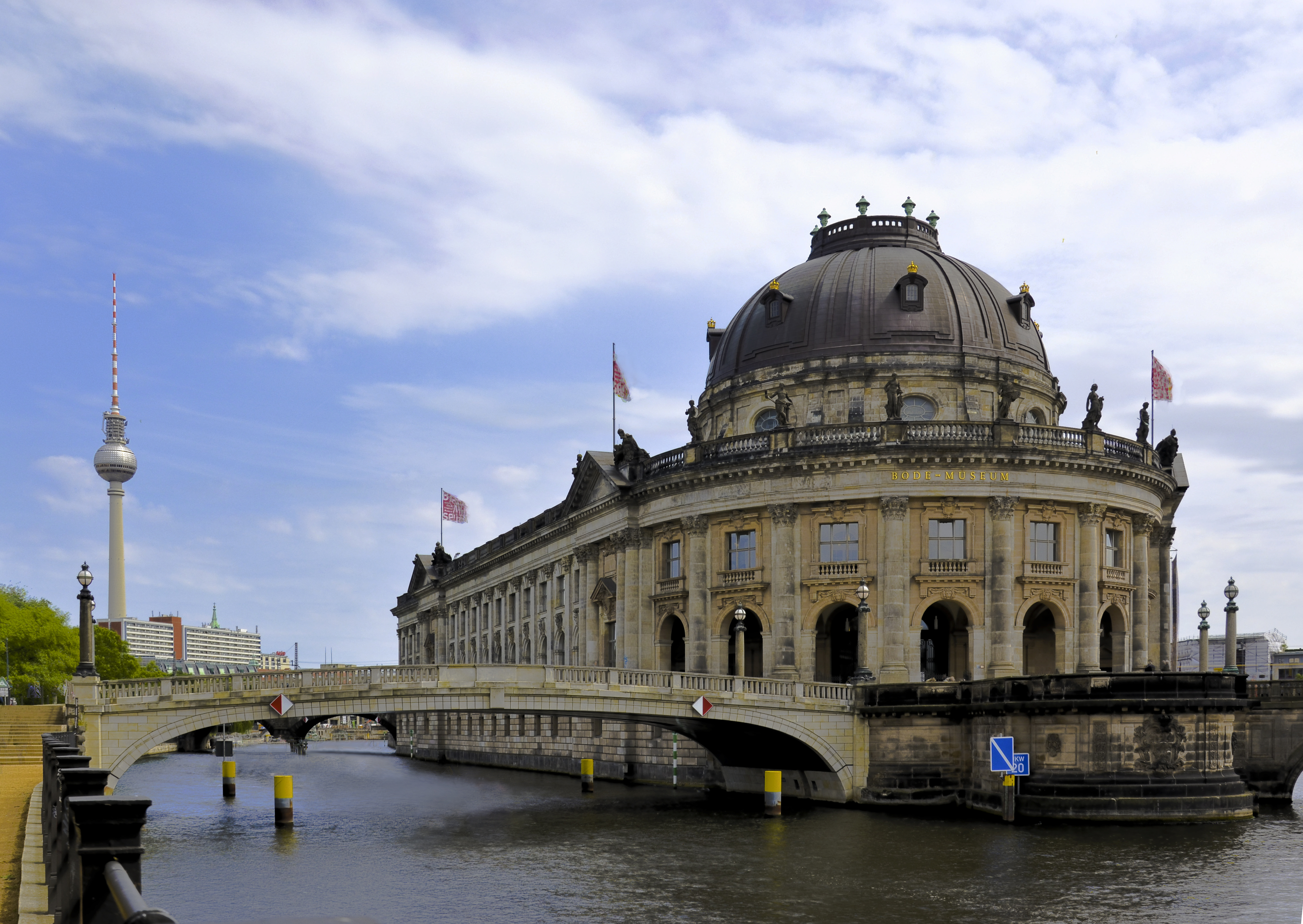
Bode Museum on Museum Island

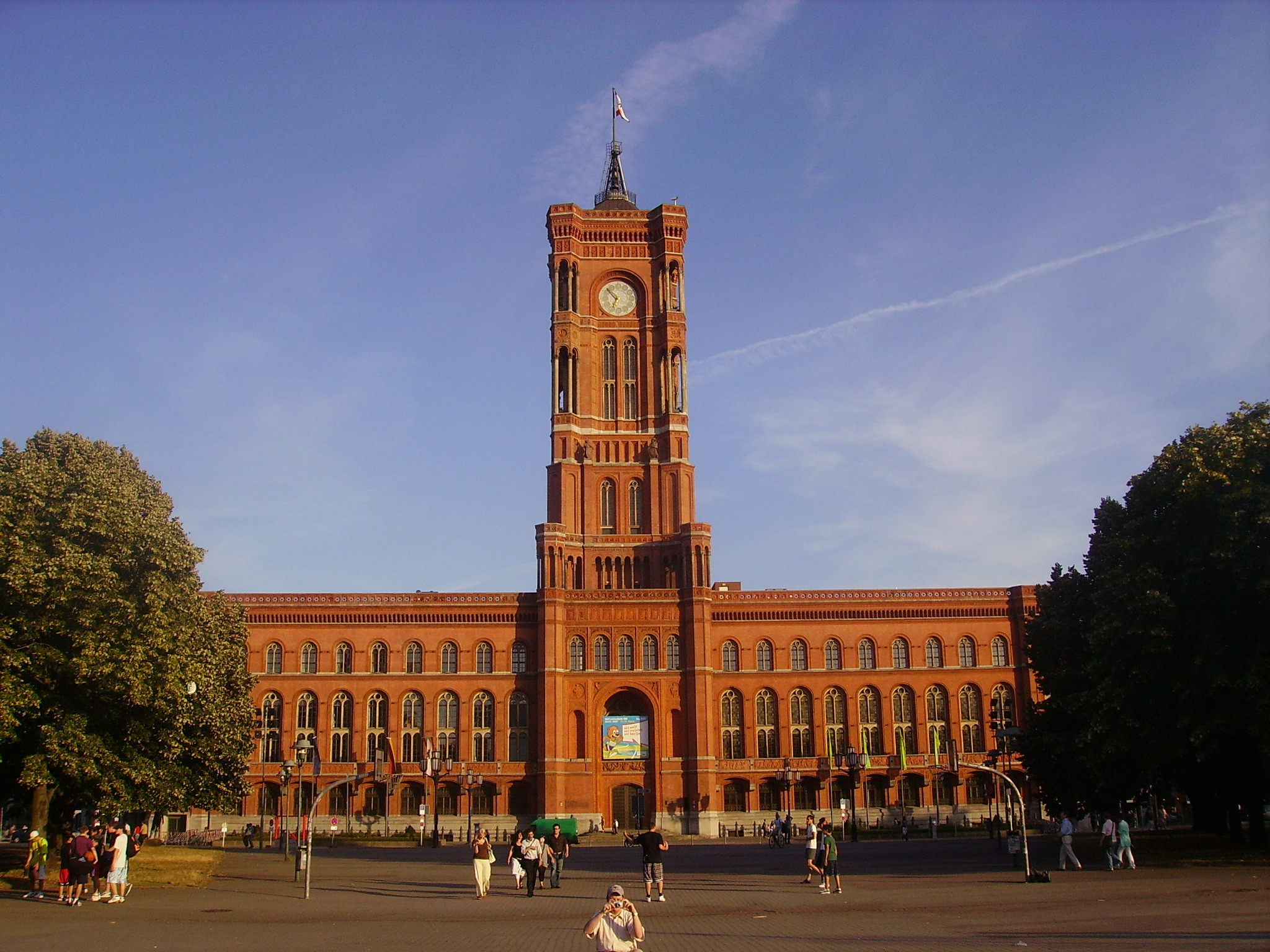
Rotes Rathaus (Red City Hall)

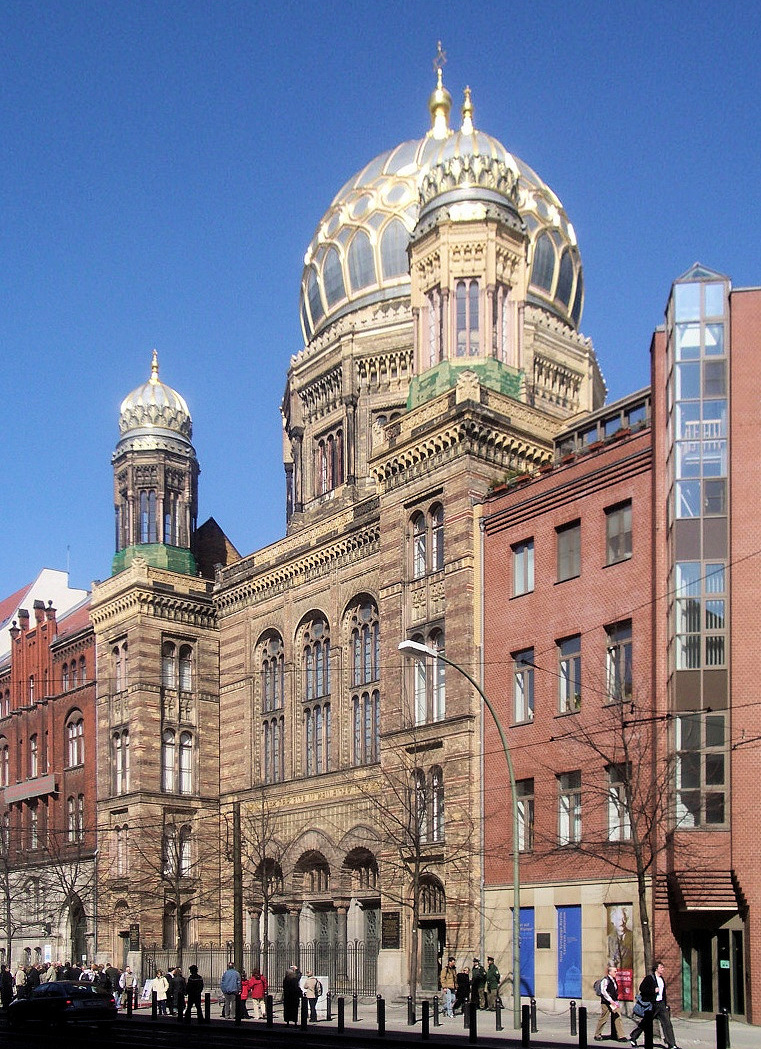
New Synagogue

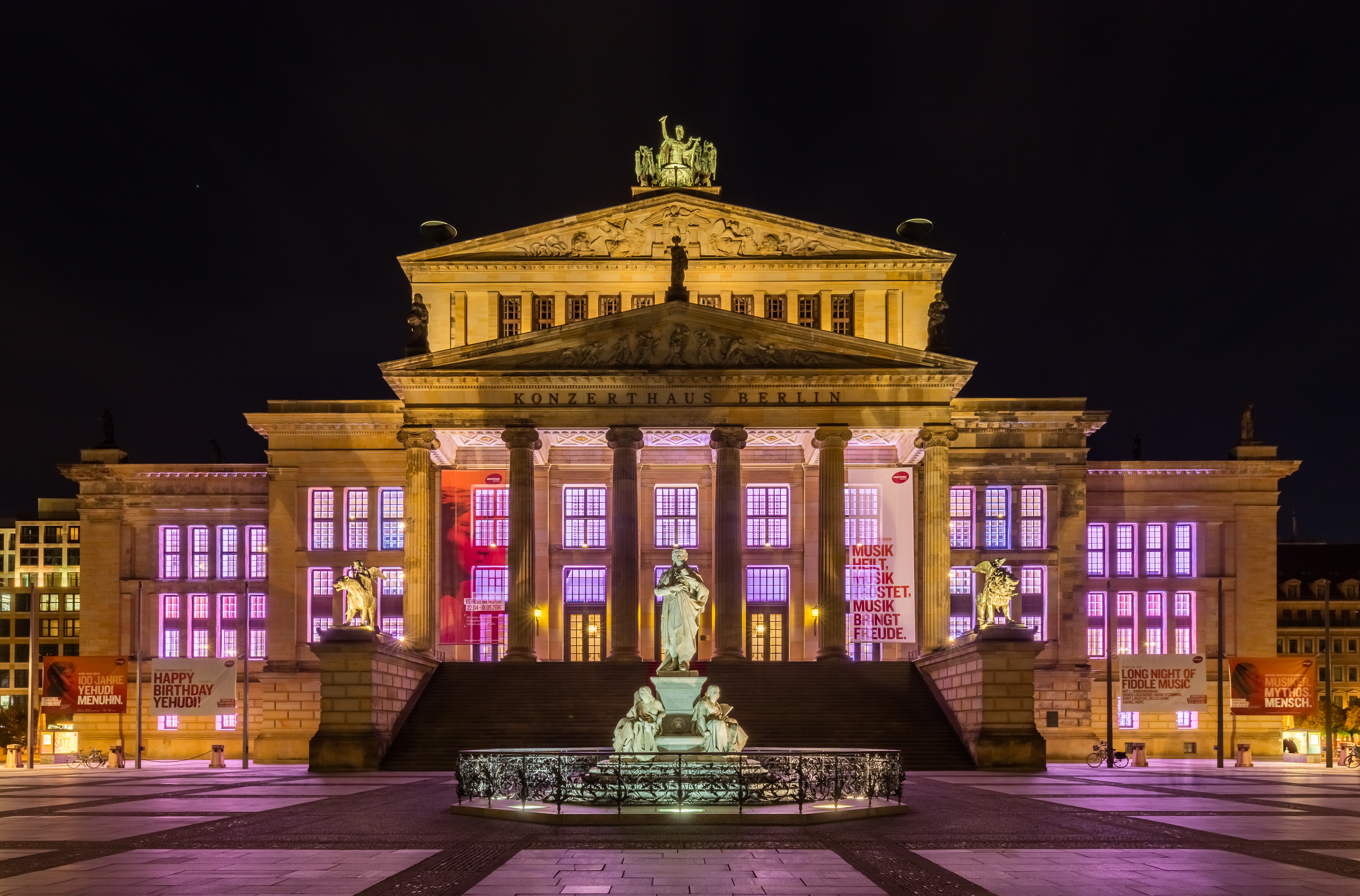
Gendarmenmarkt

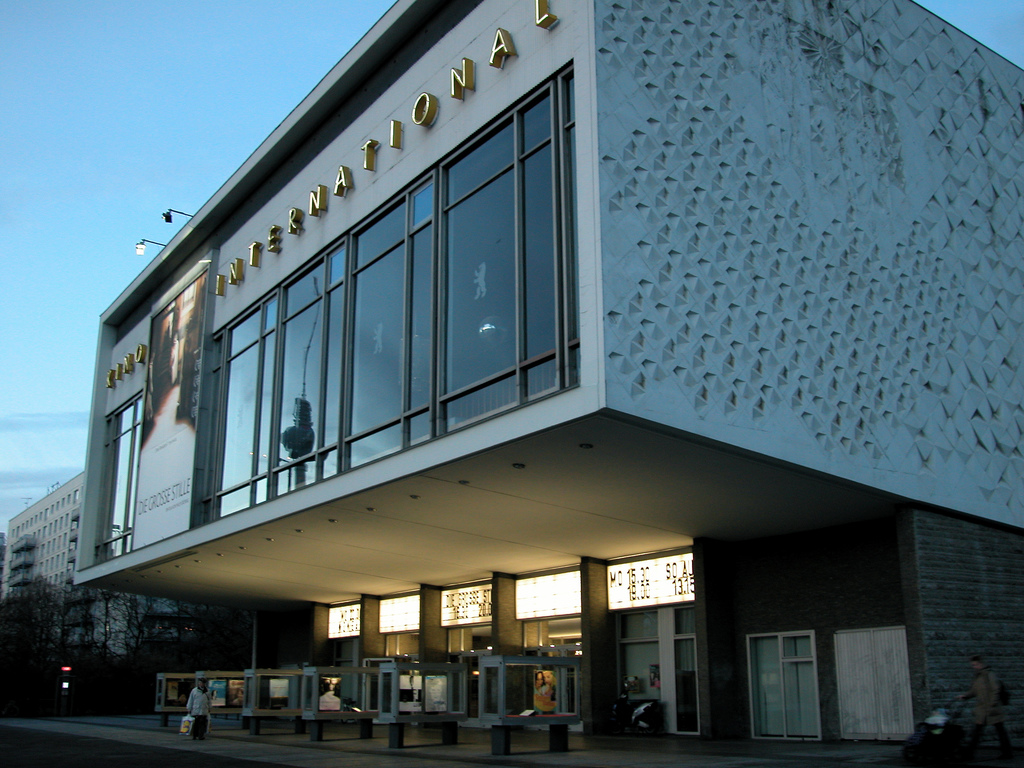
Kino International

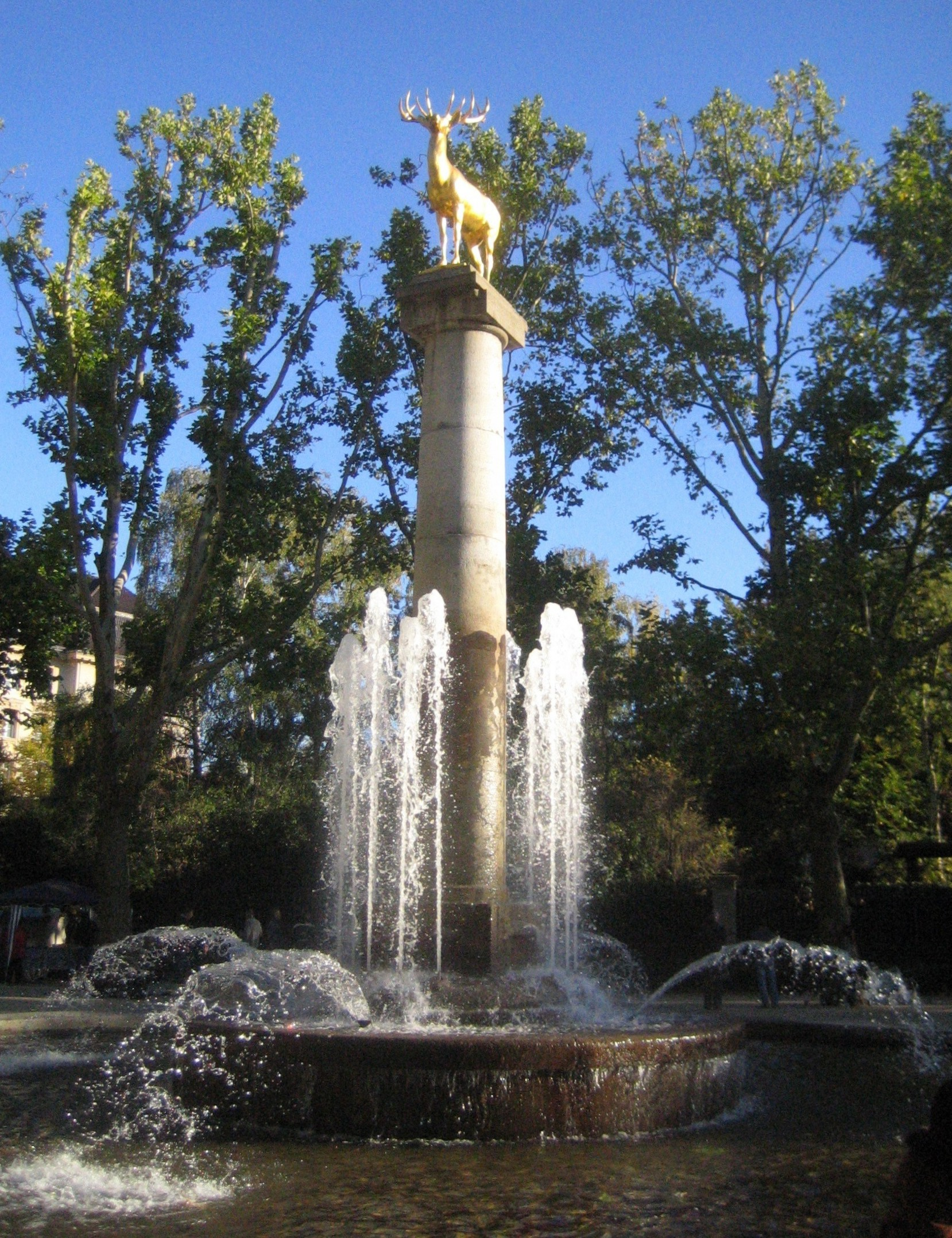
Volkspark Schöneberg

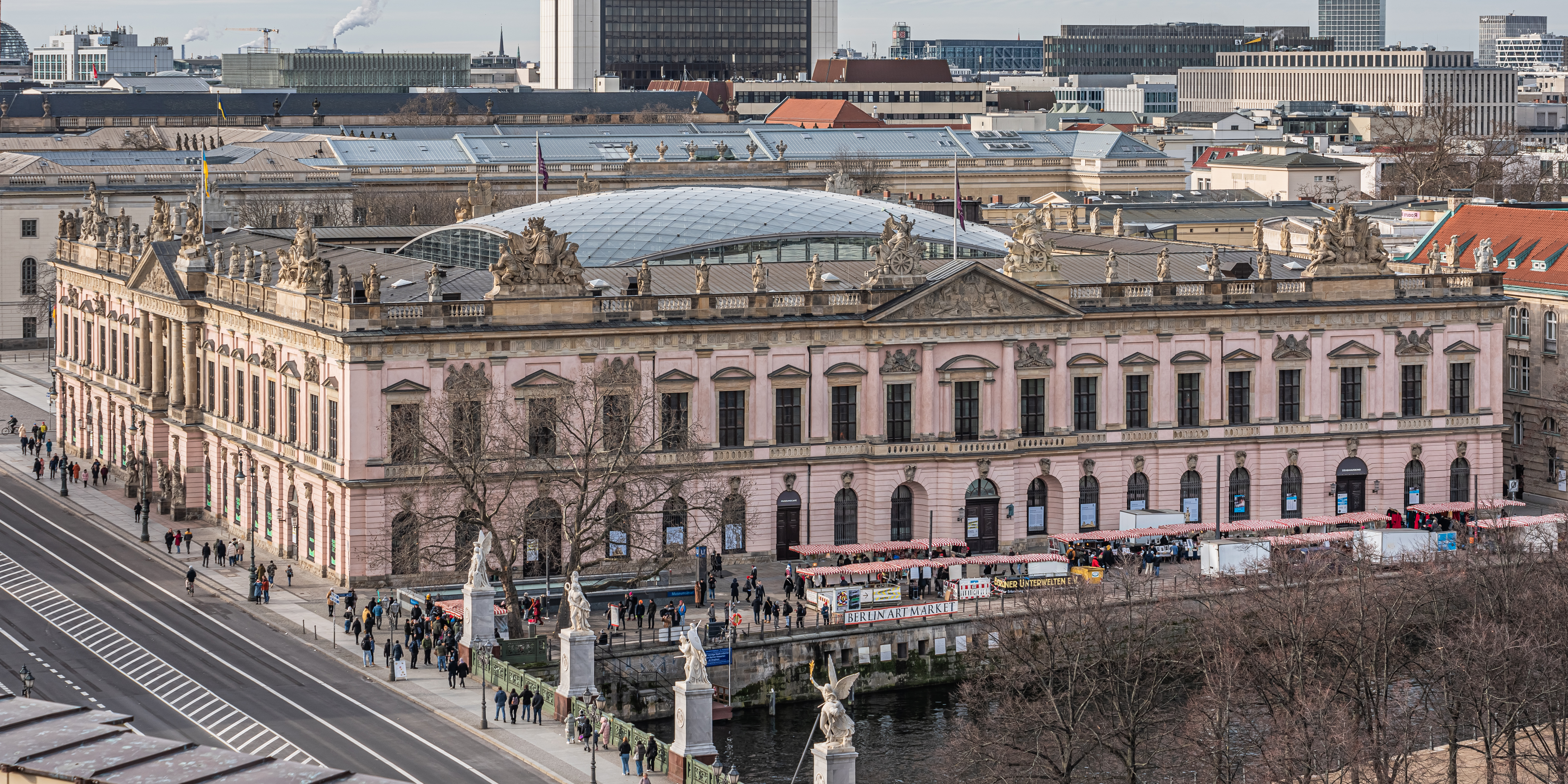
Former armory, now museum on Unter den Linden boulevard

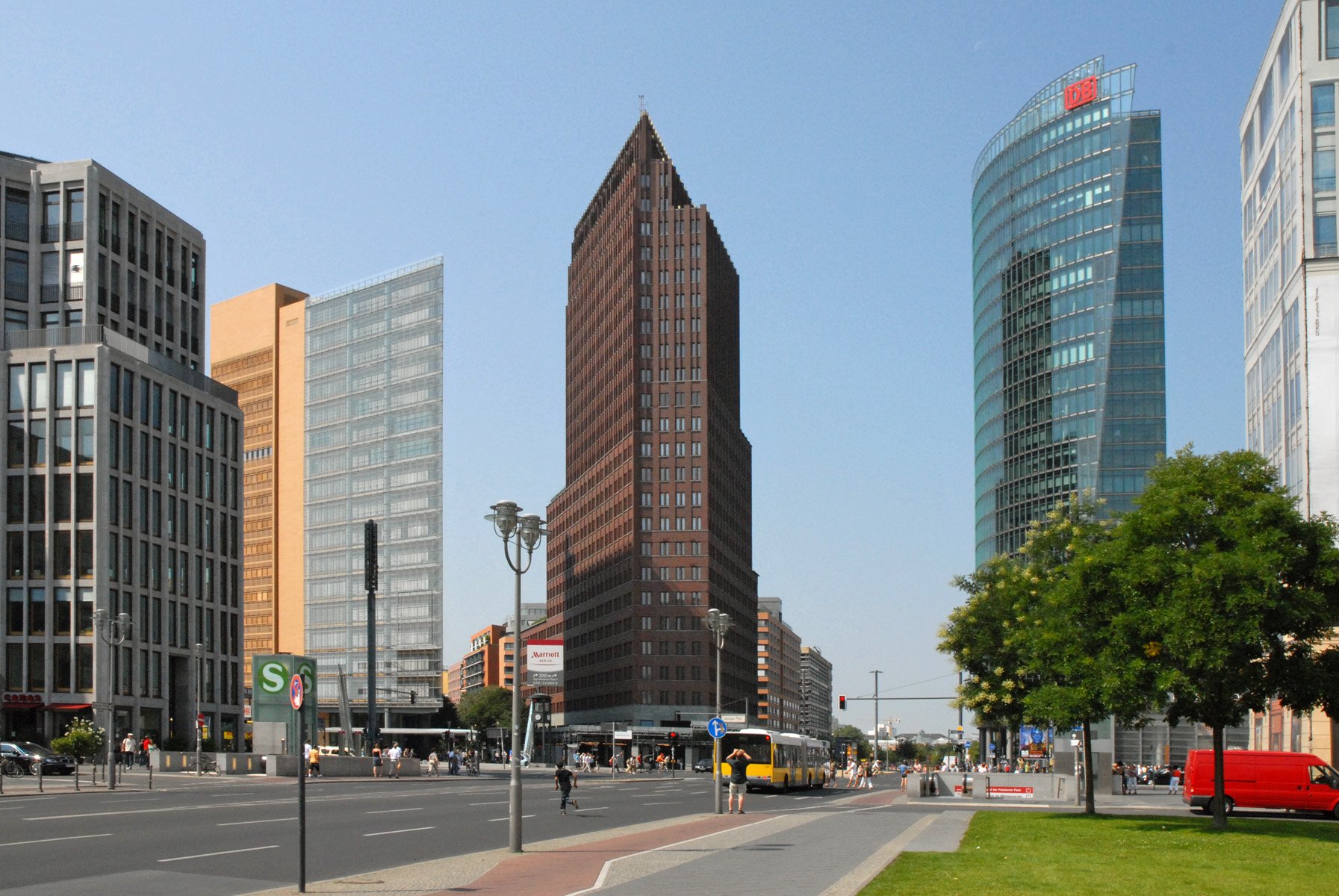
View over Potsdamer Platz

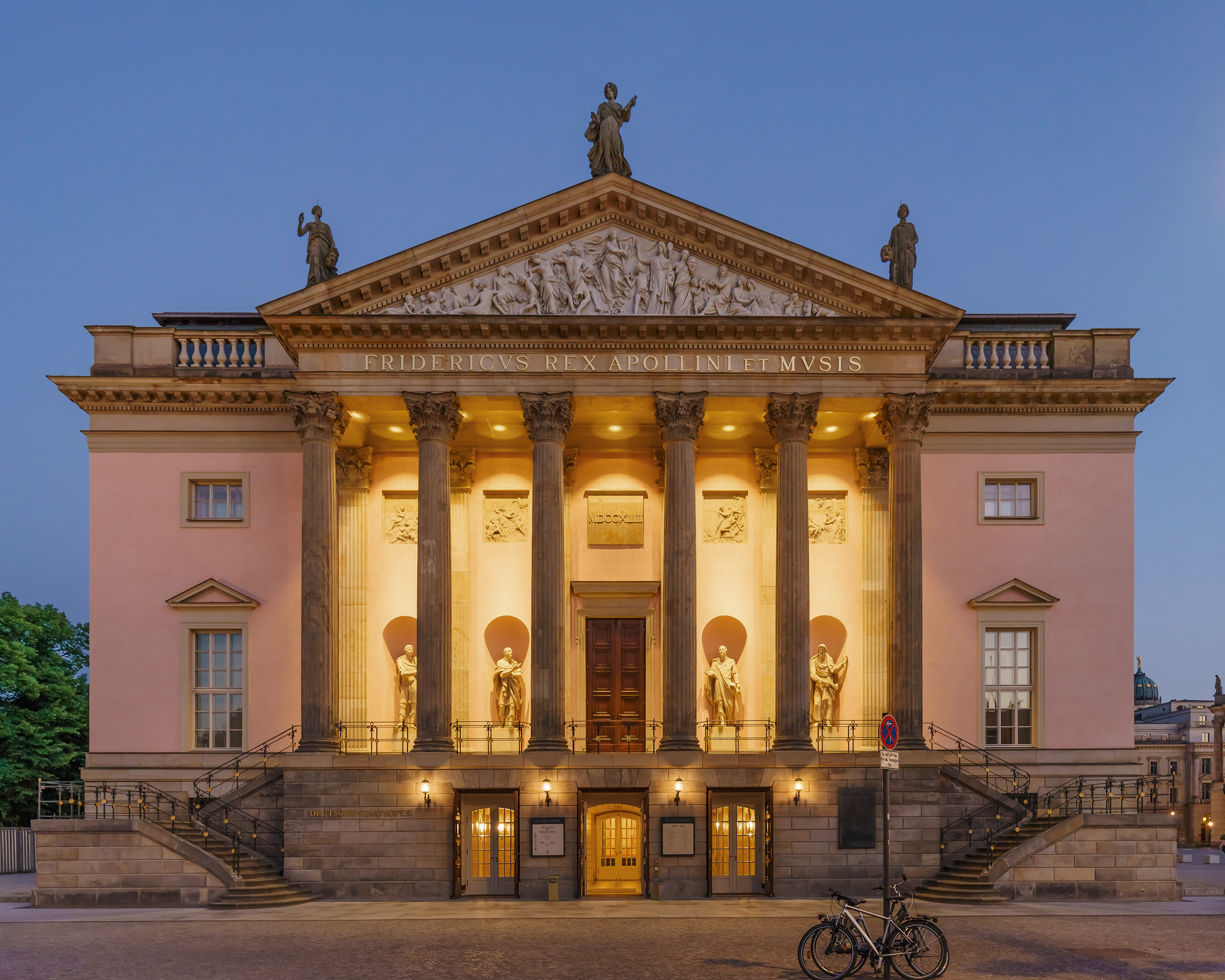
Staatsoper (State Opera)

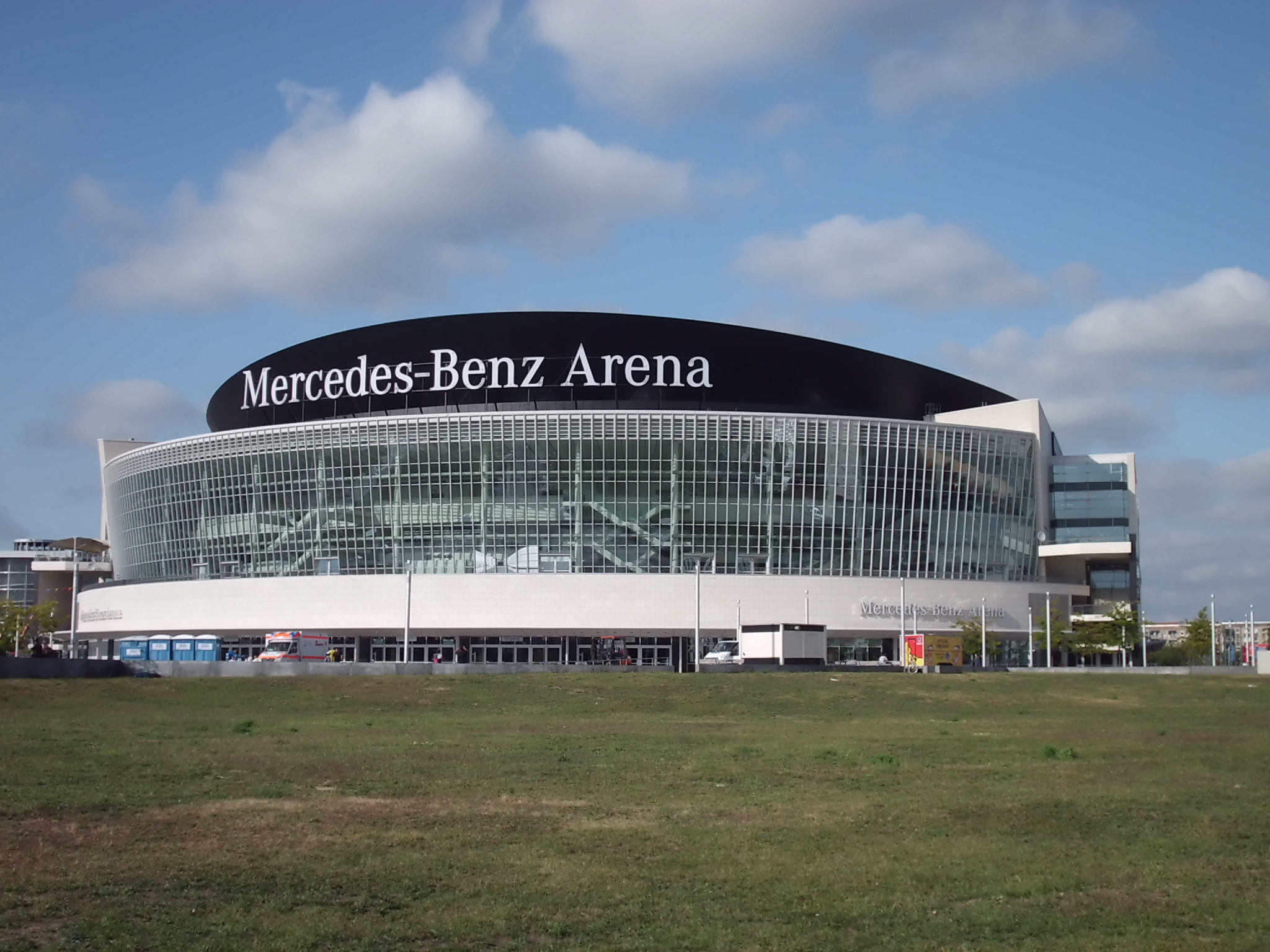
Mercedes-Benz Arena (Berlin)

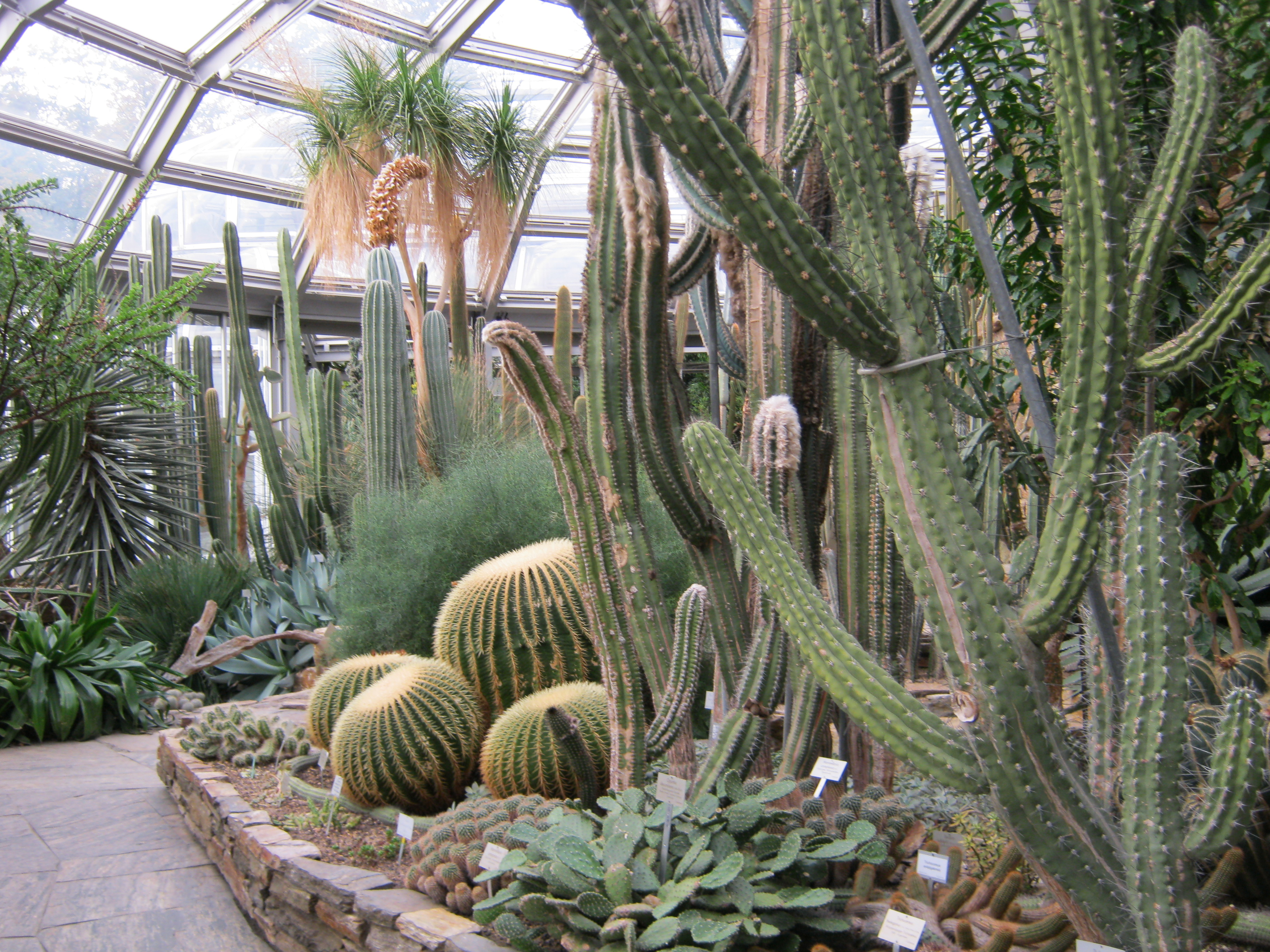
Botanischer Garten

Alexanderplatz

Pariser Platz with Brandenburg Gate

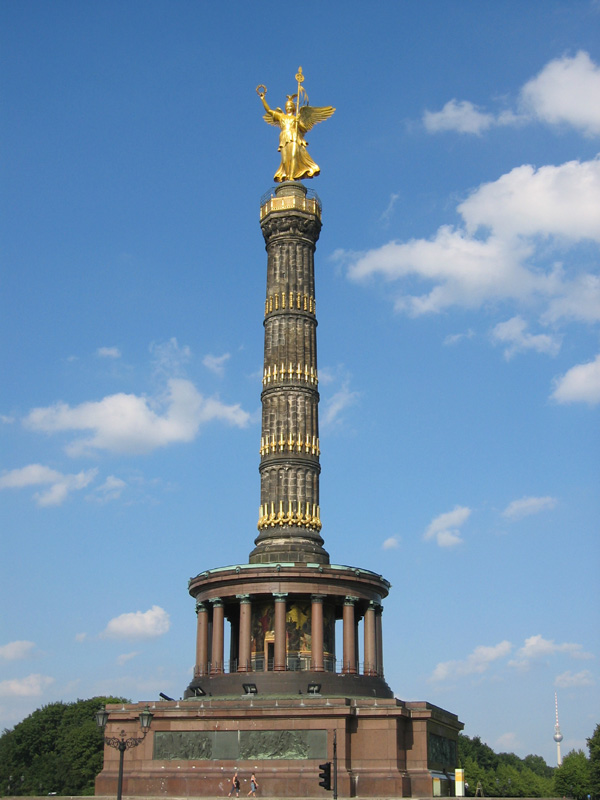
Berlin Victory Column in the Tiergarten

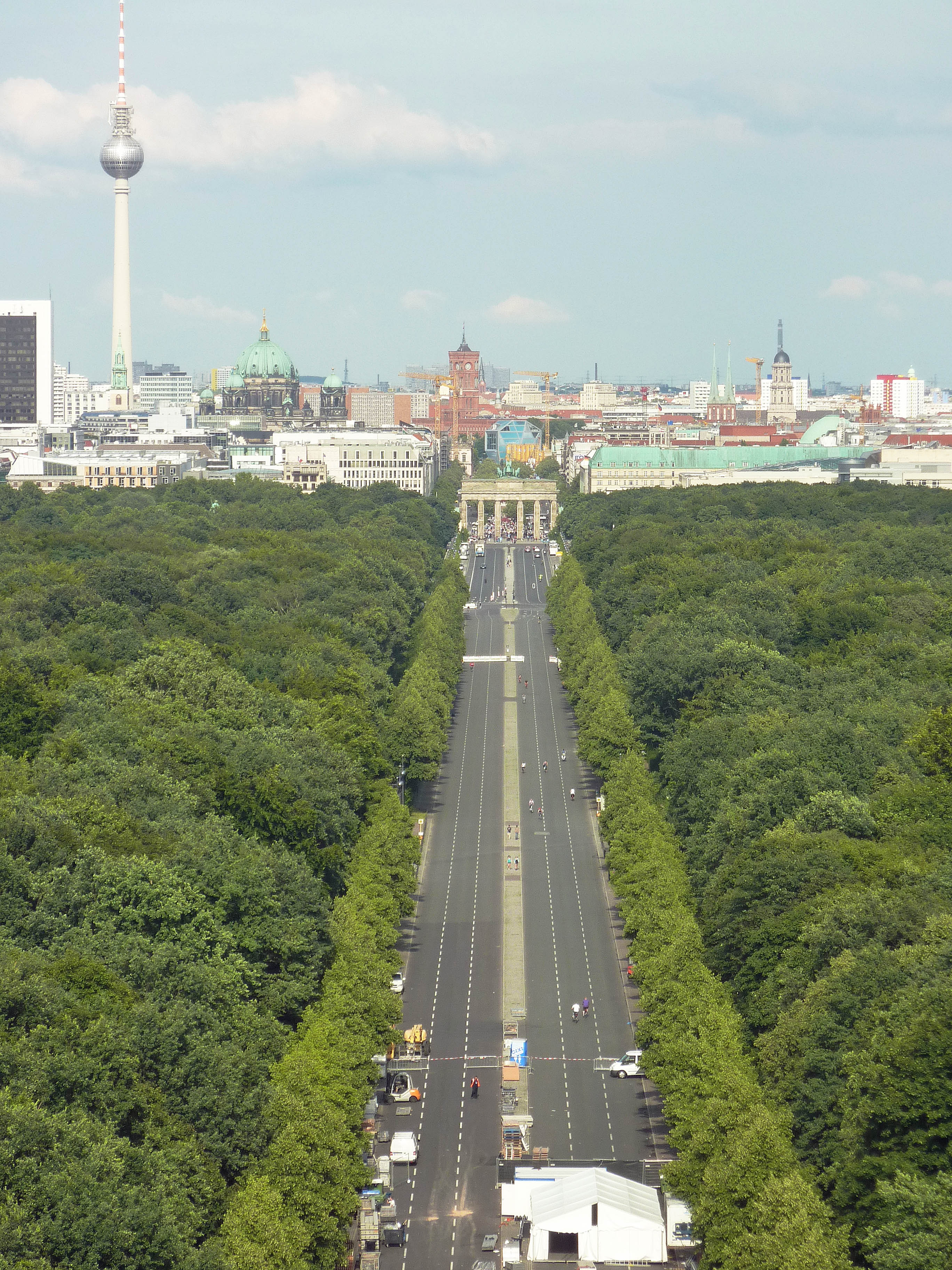
Straße des 17. Juni

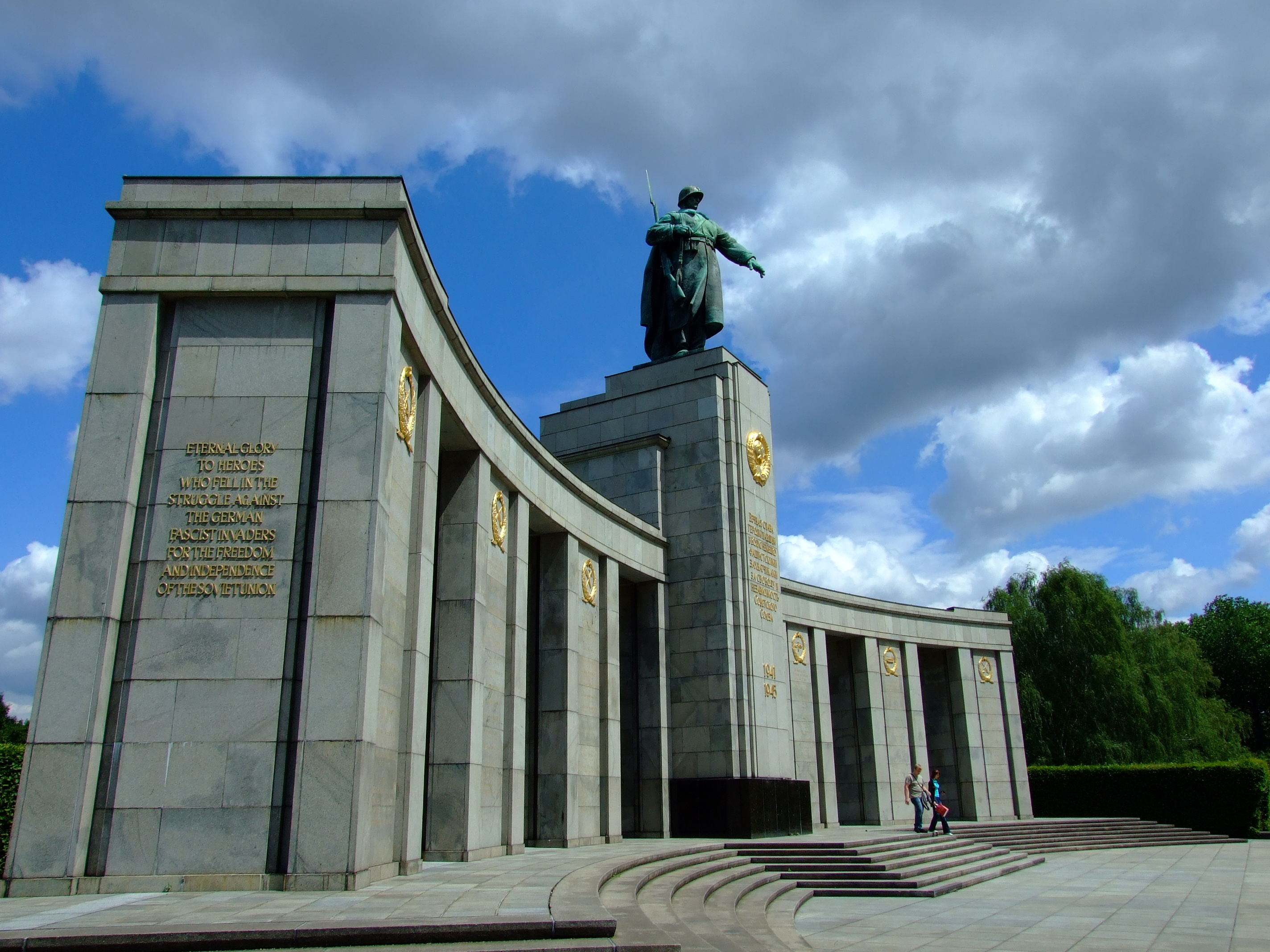
Soviet War Memorial

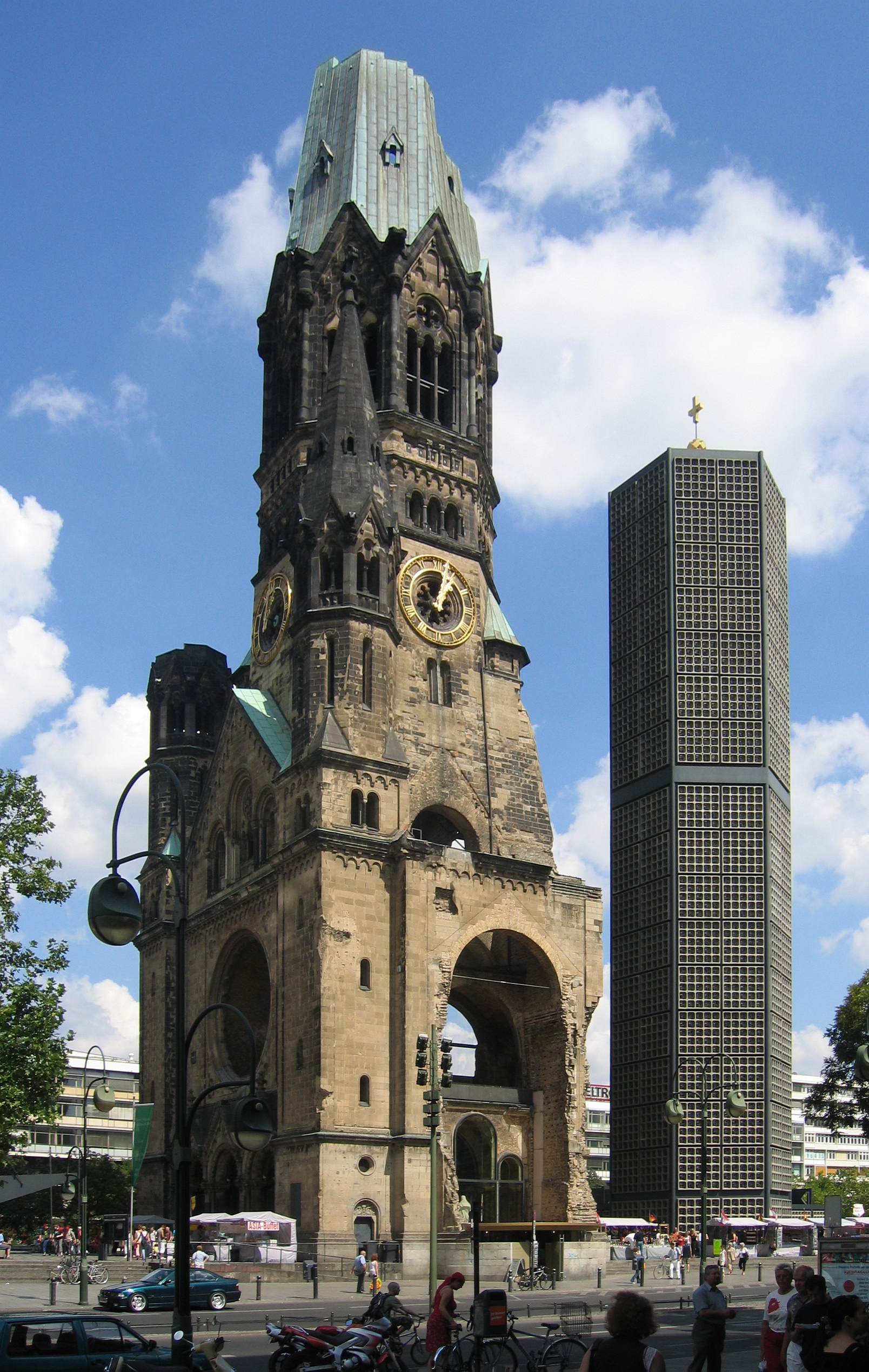
Kaiser Wilhelm Memorial Church

Charlottenburg Palace

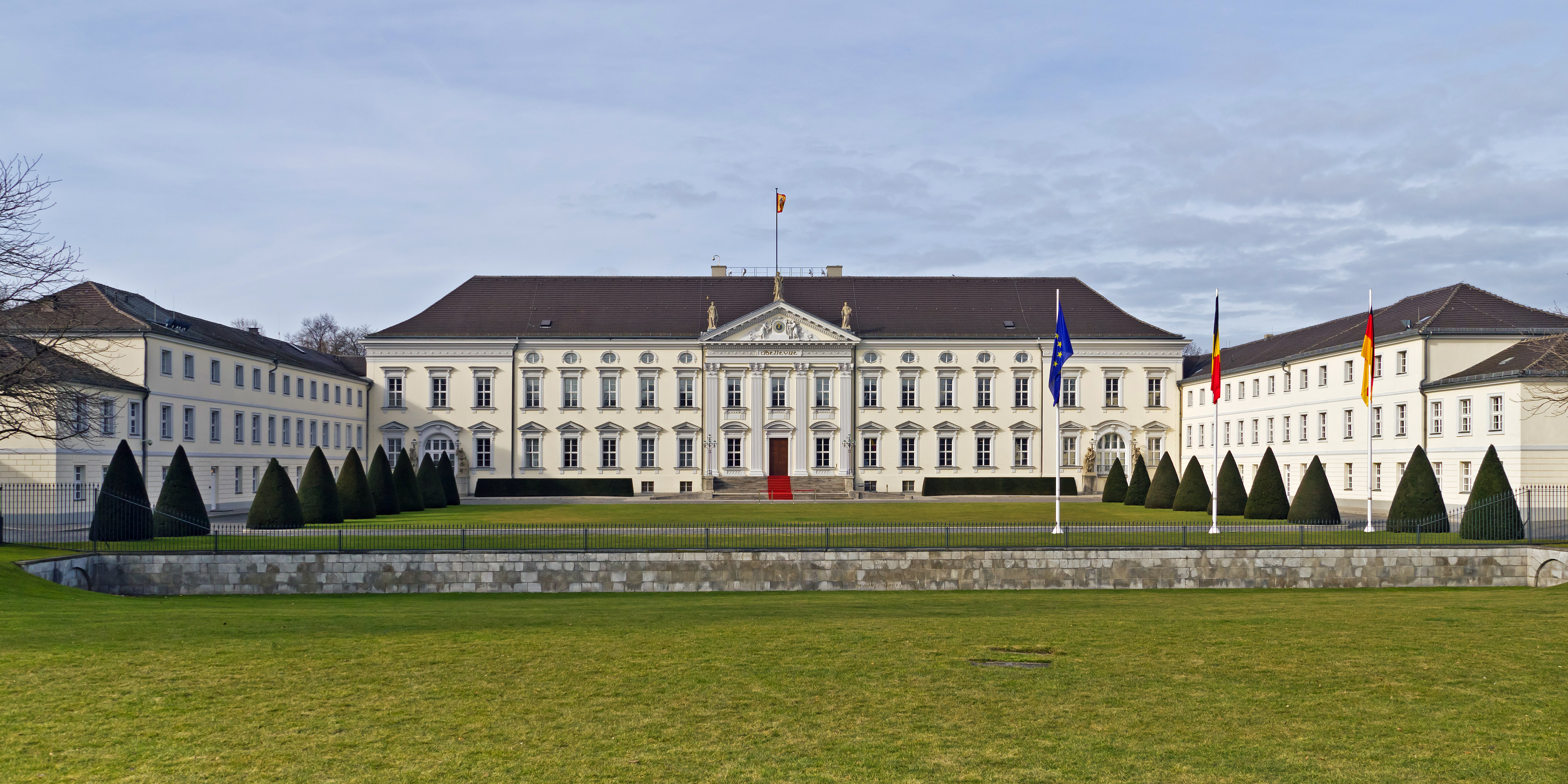
Bellevue Palace

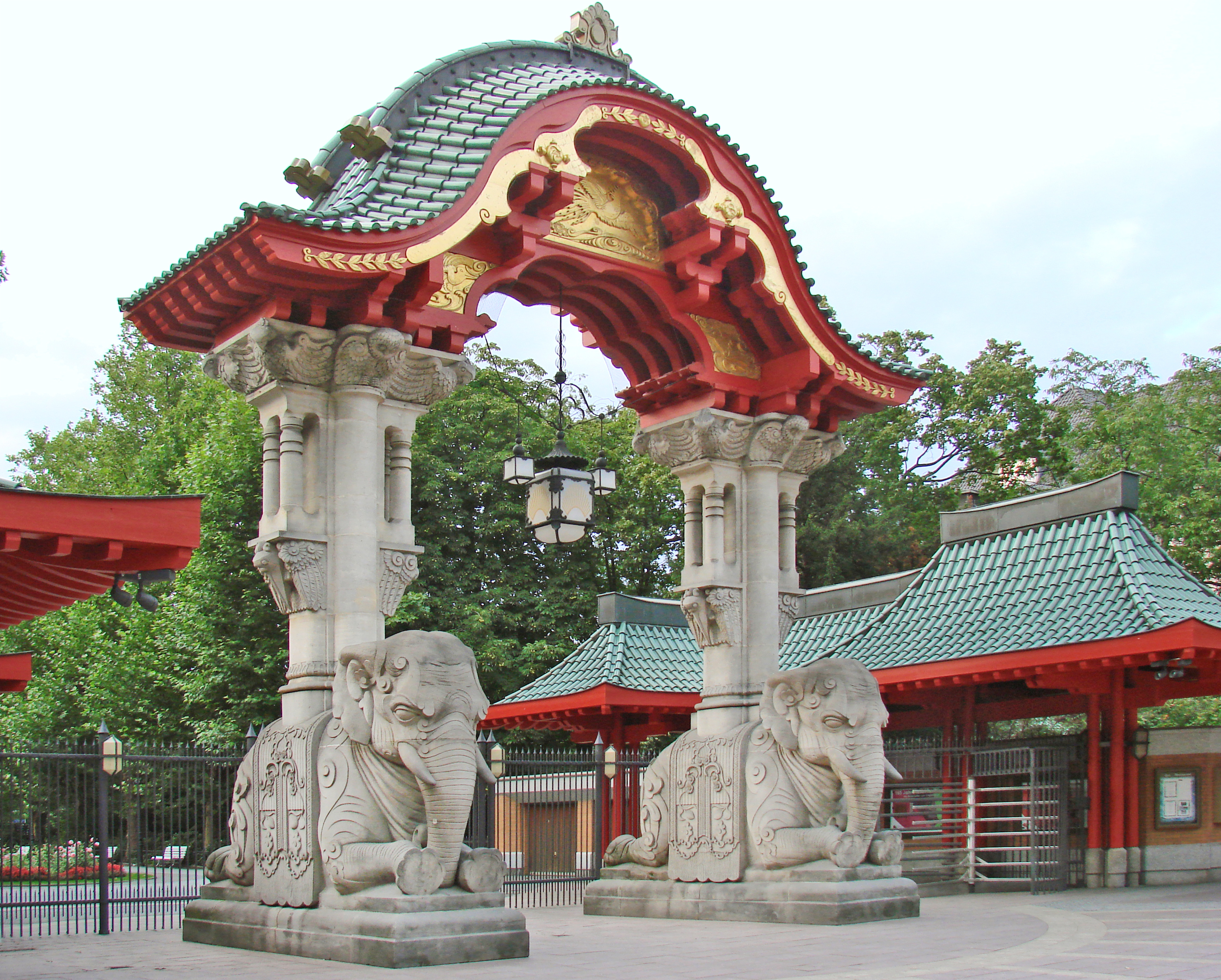
Entrance to Berlin Zoo

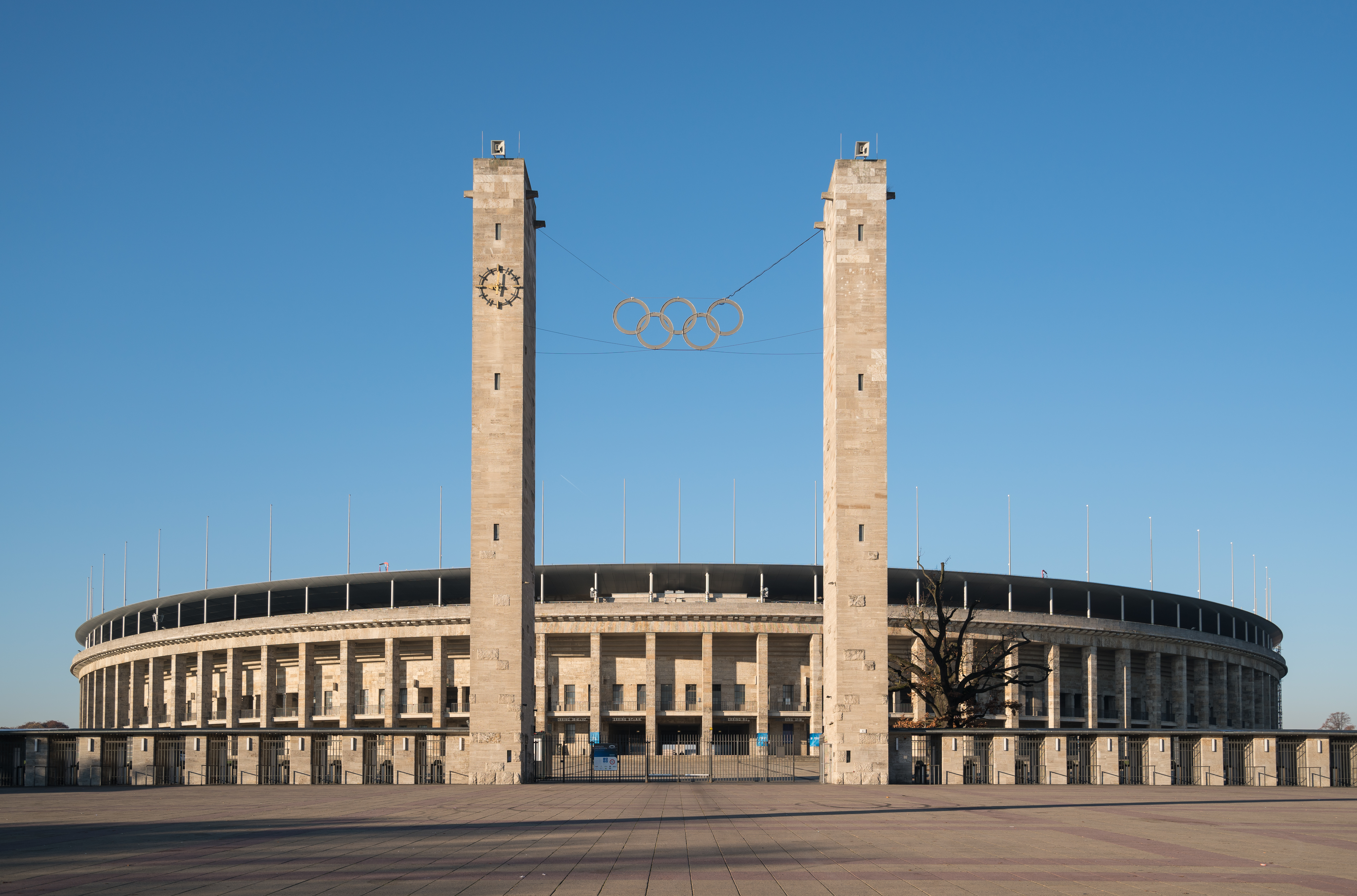
Olympic Stadium

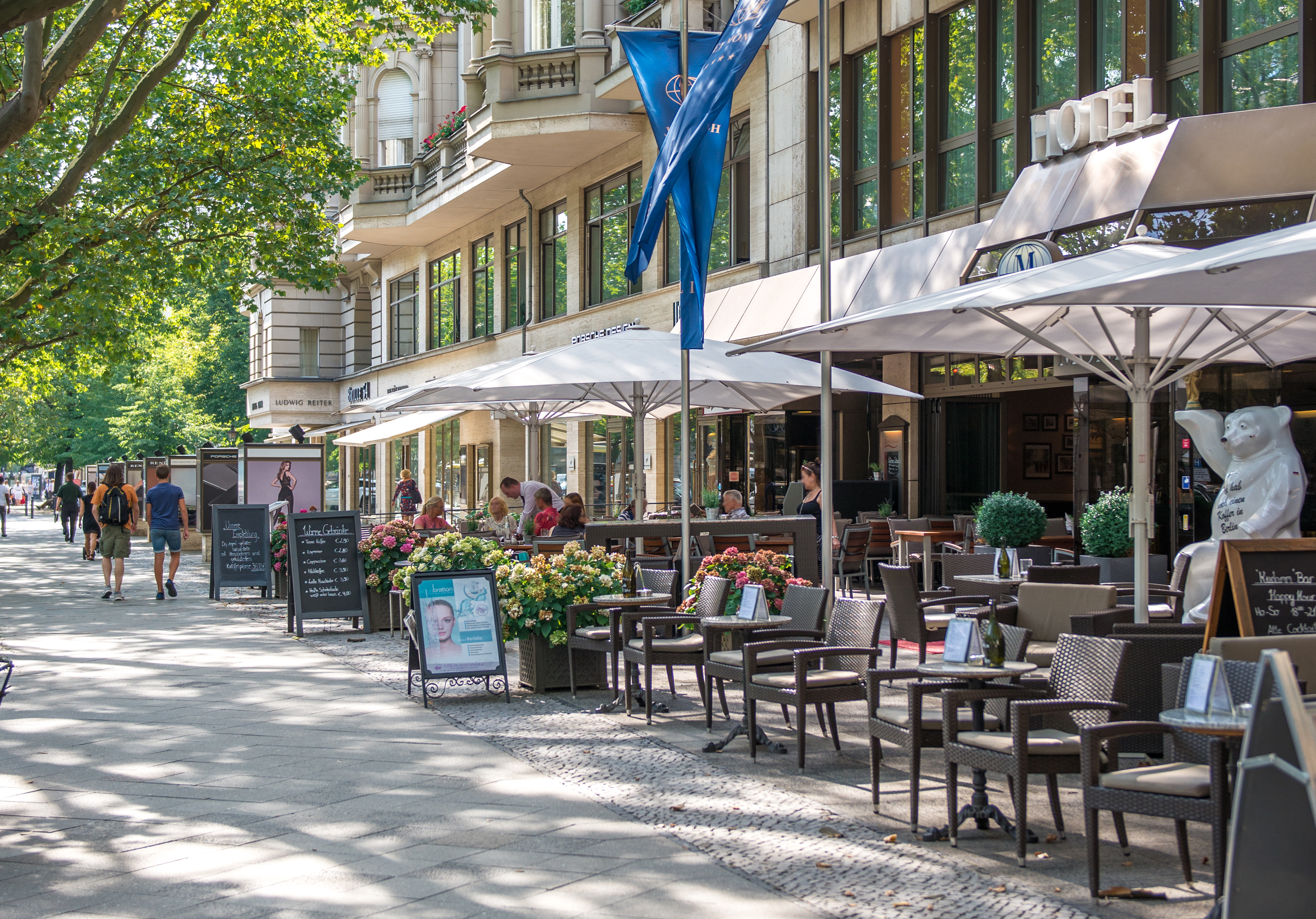
Kurfürstendamm (shopping street)

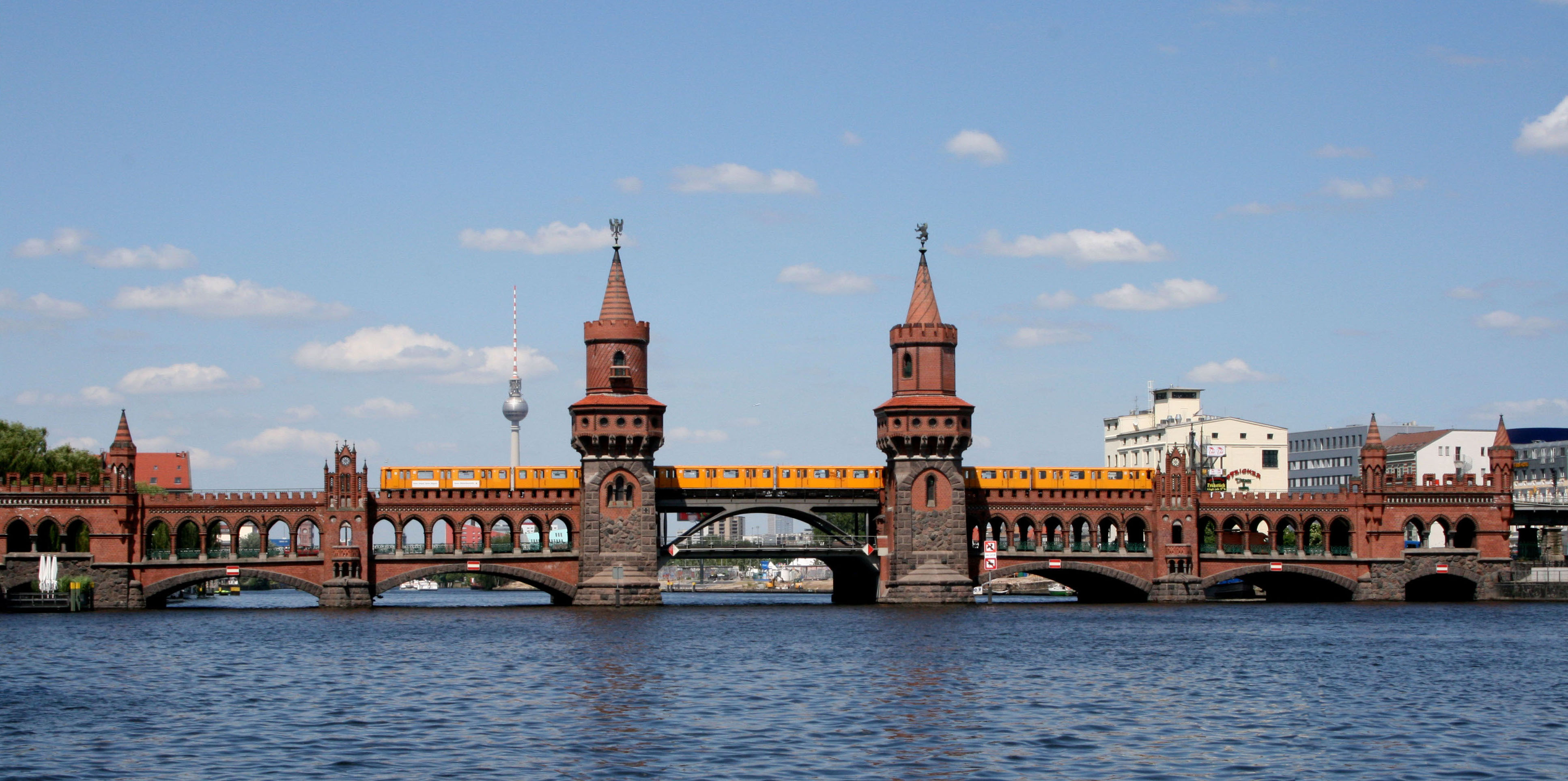
Oberbaum Bridge

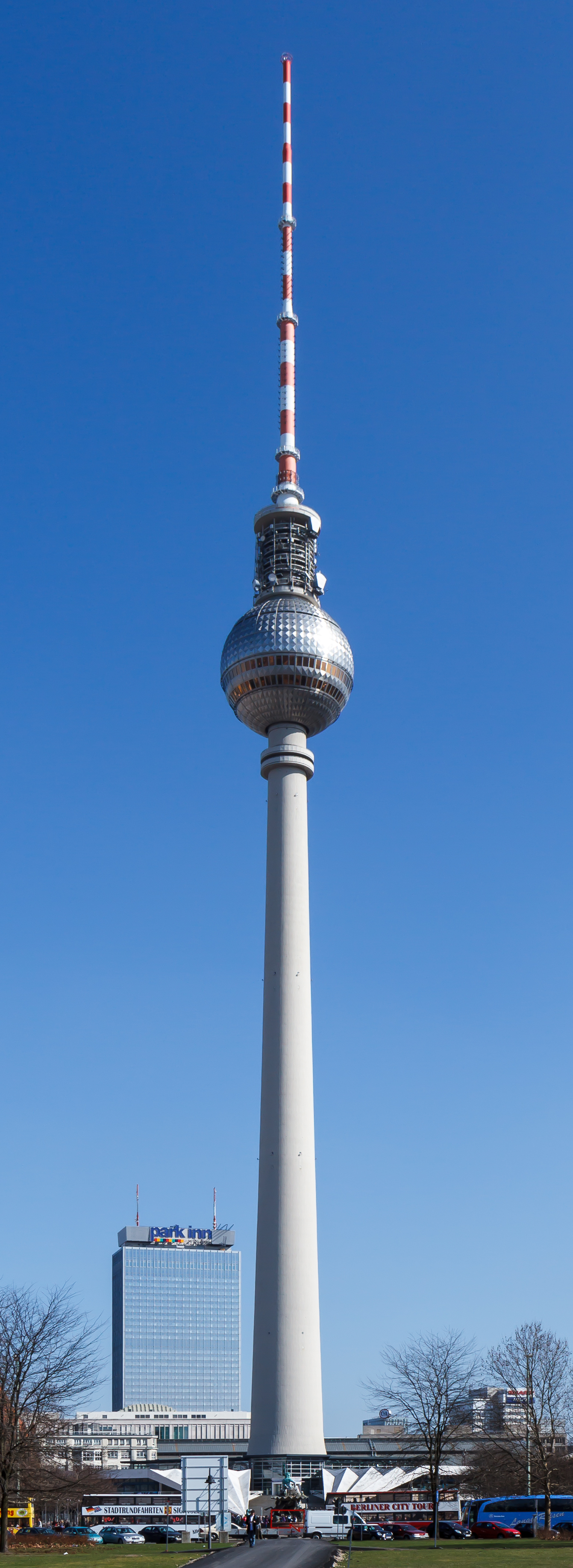
Berlin TV Tower (Fernsehturm)

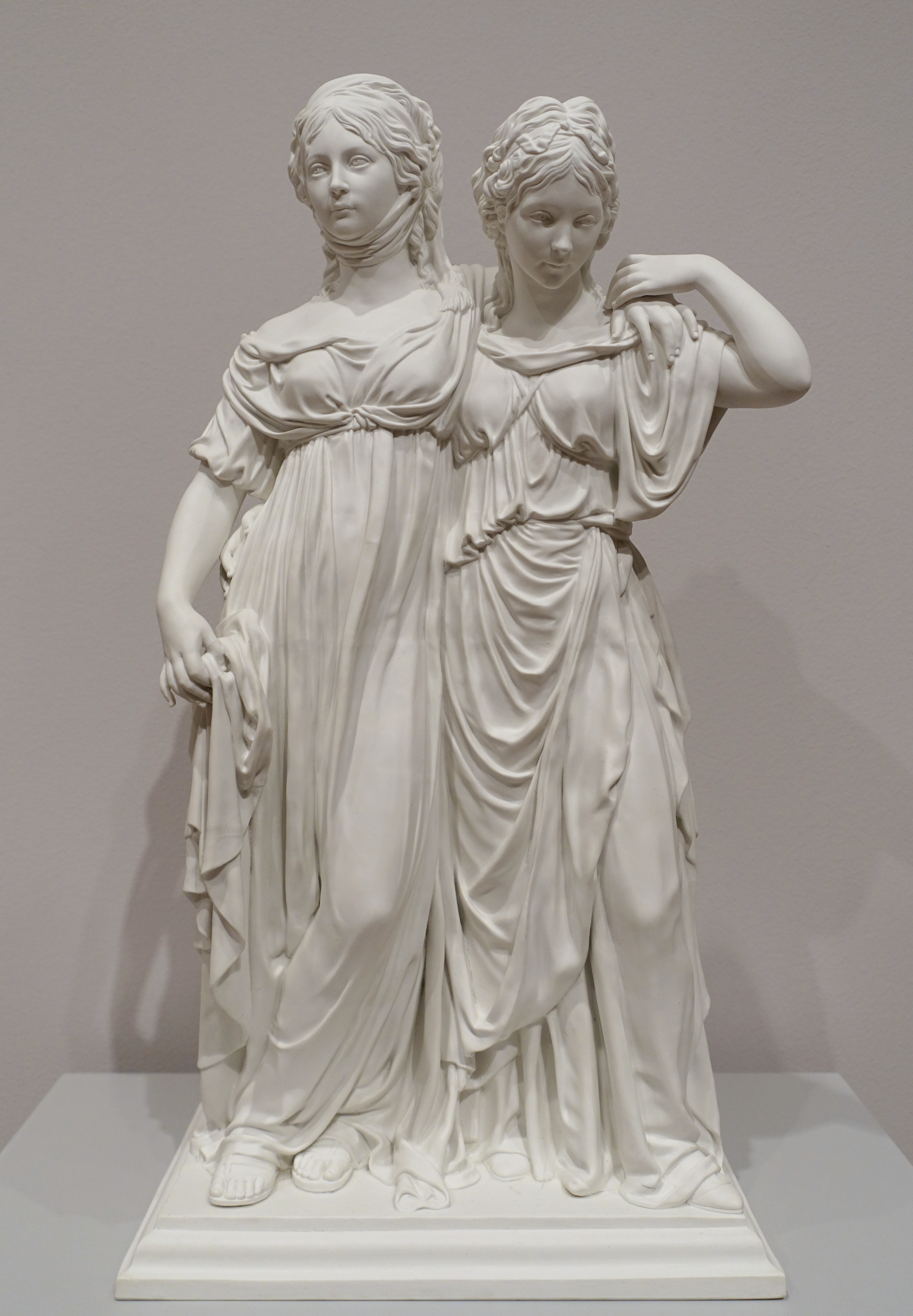
Royal Porcelain Factory, Berlin

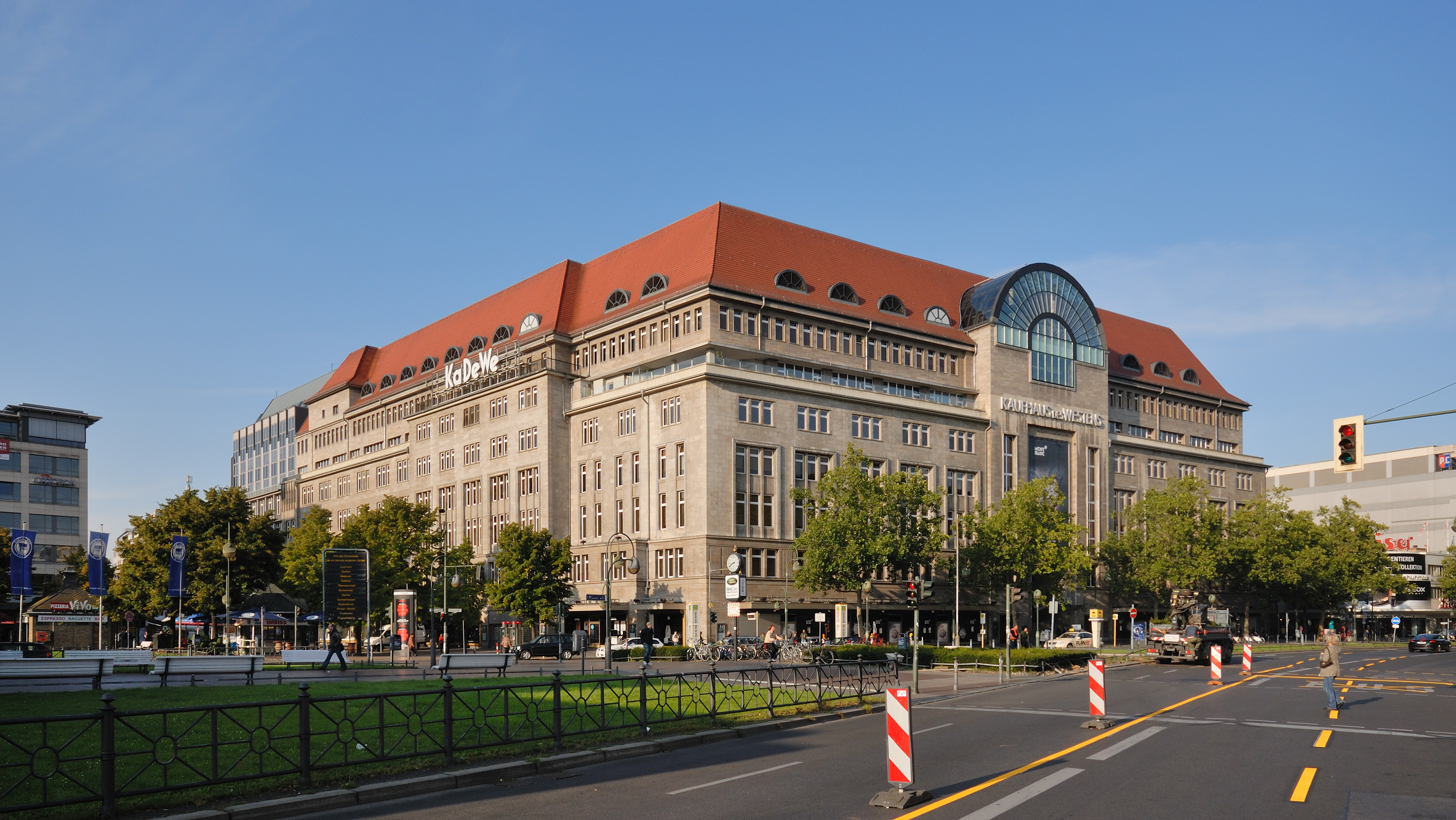
The Kaufhaus des Westens department store

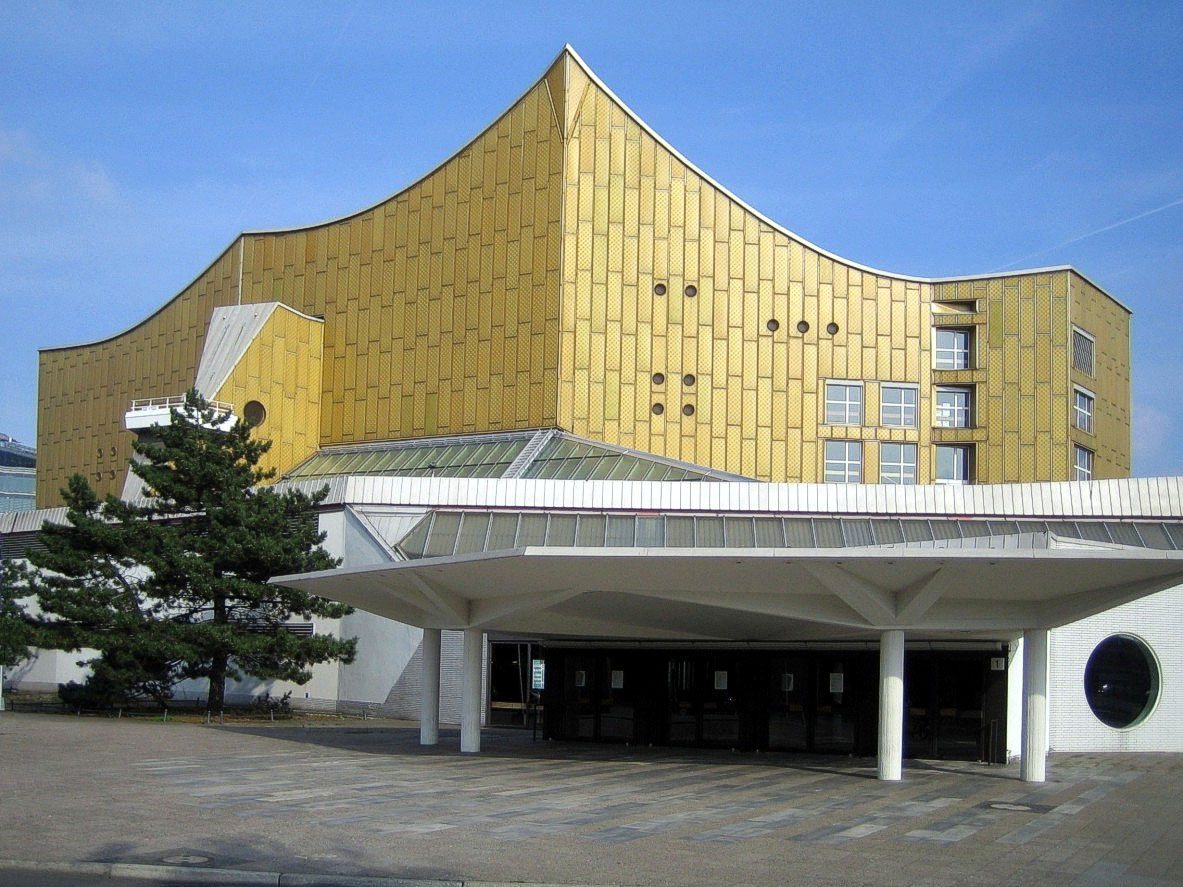
Berliner Philharmonie

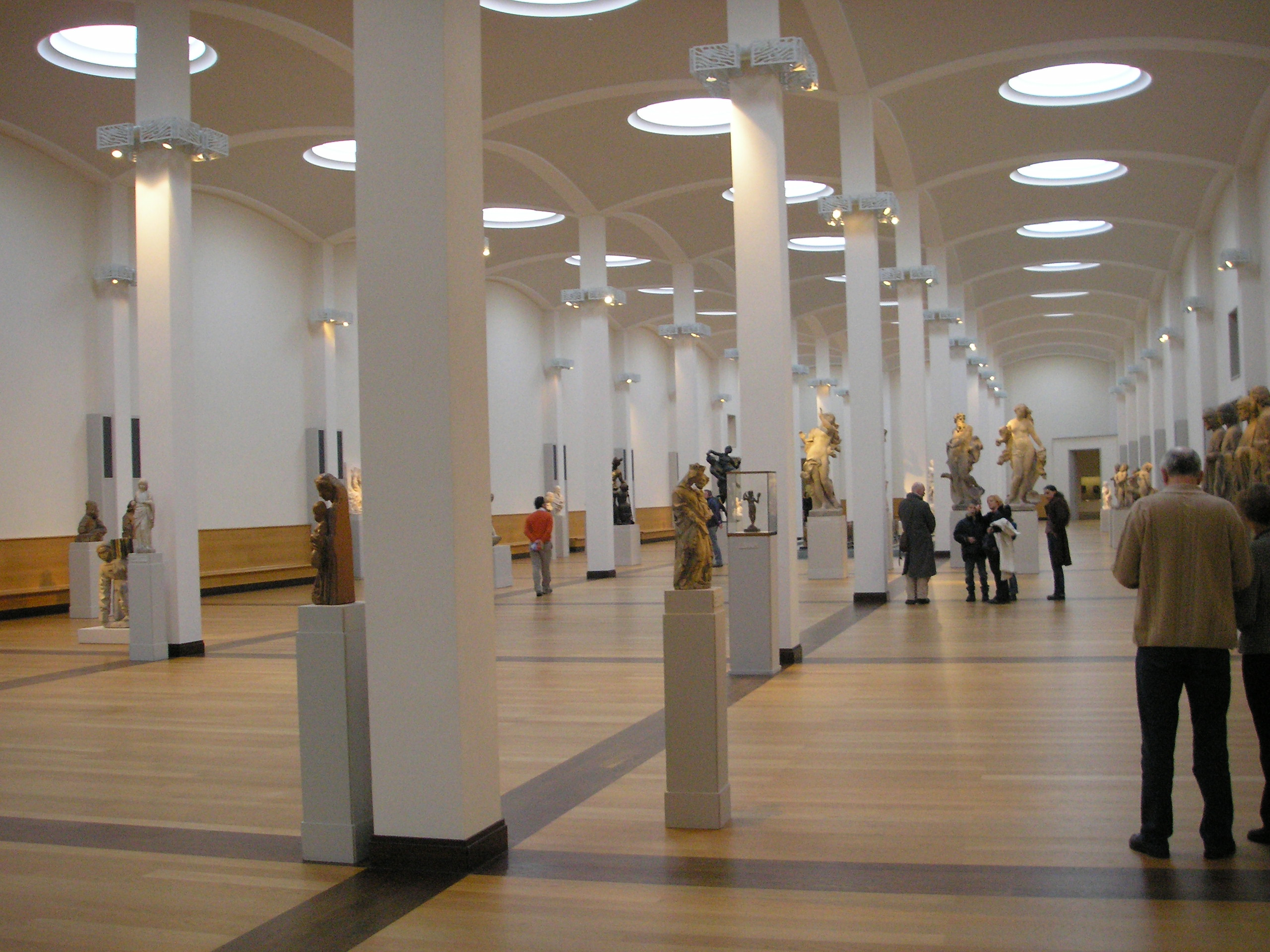
Inside the Gemäldegalerie, Berlin

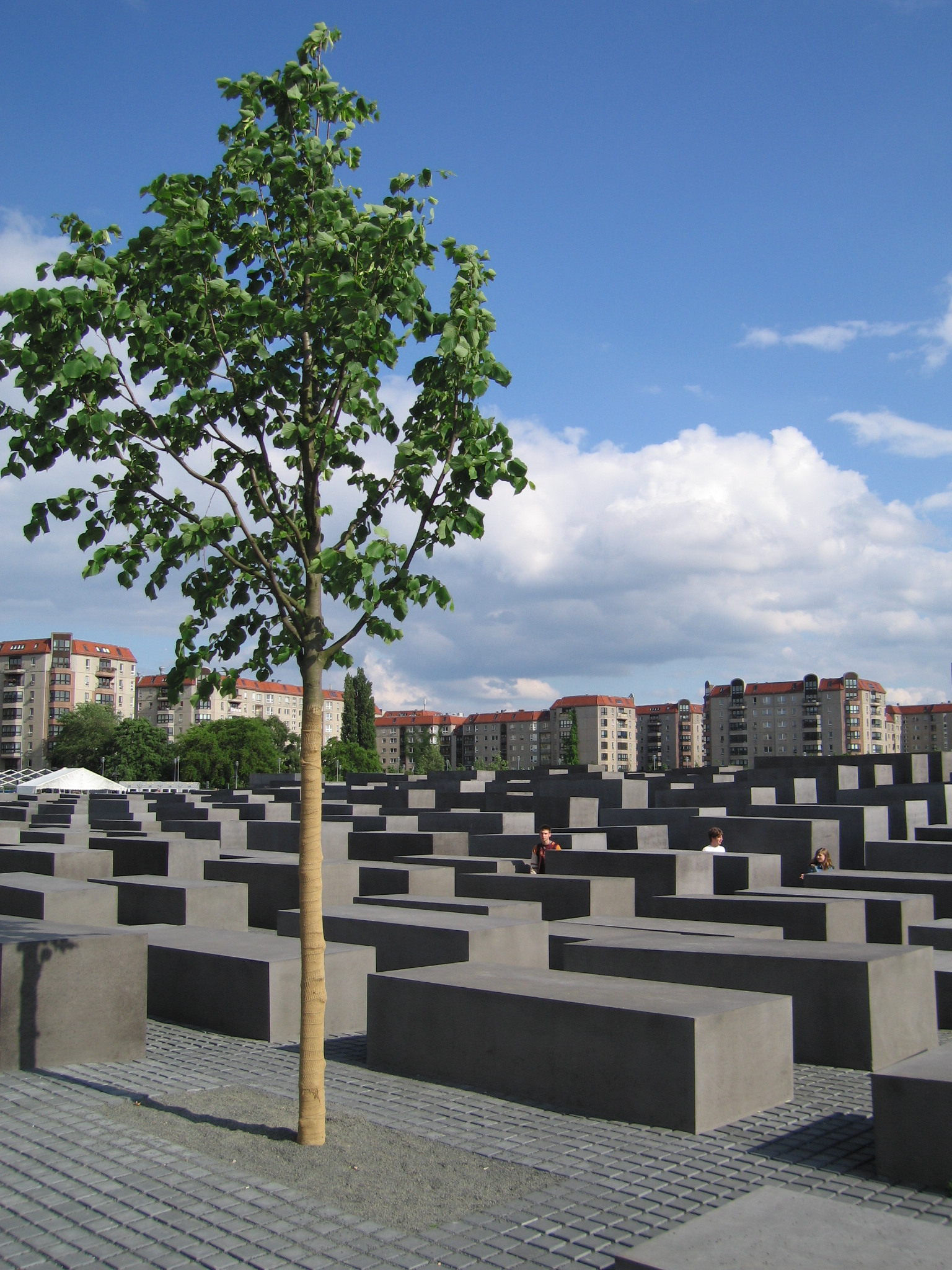
Memorial to the Murdered Jews of Europe

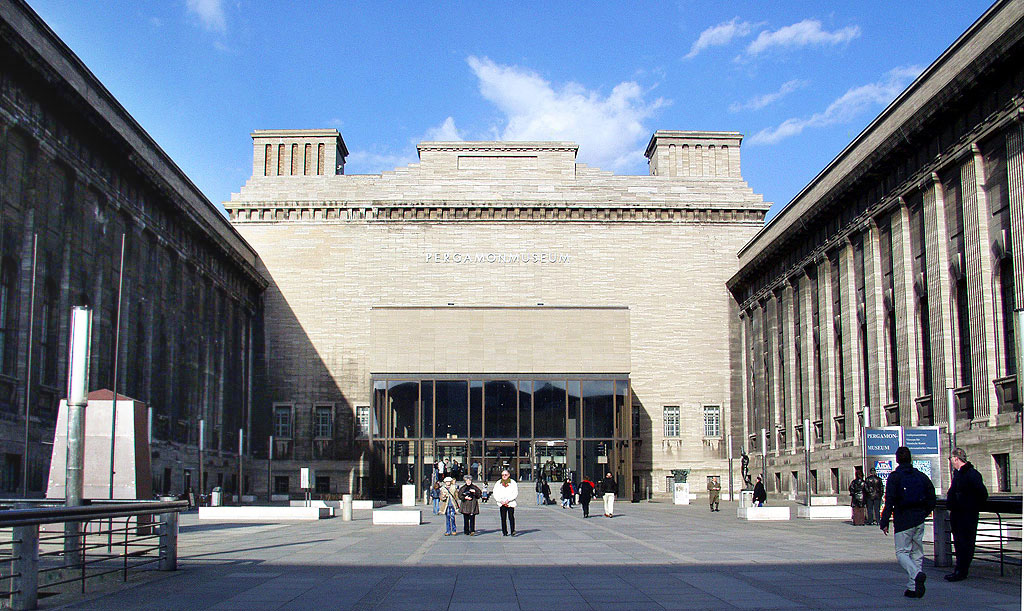
Pergamon Museum

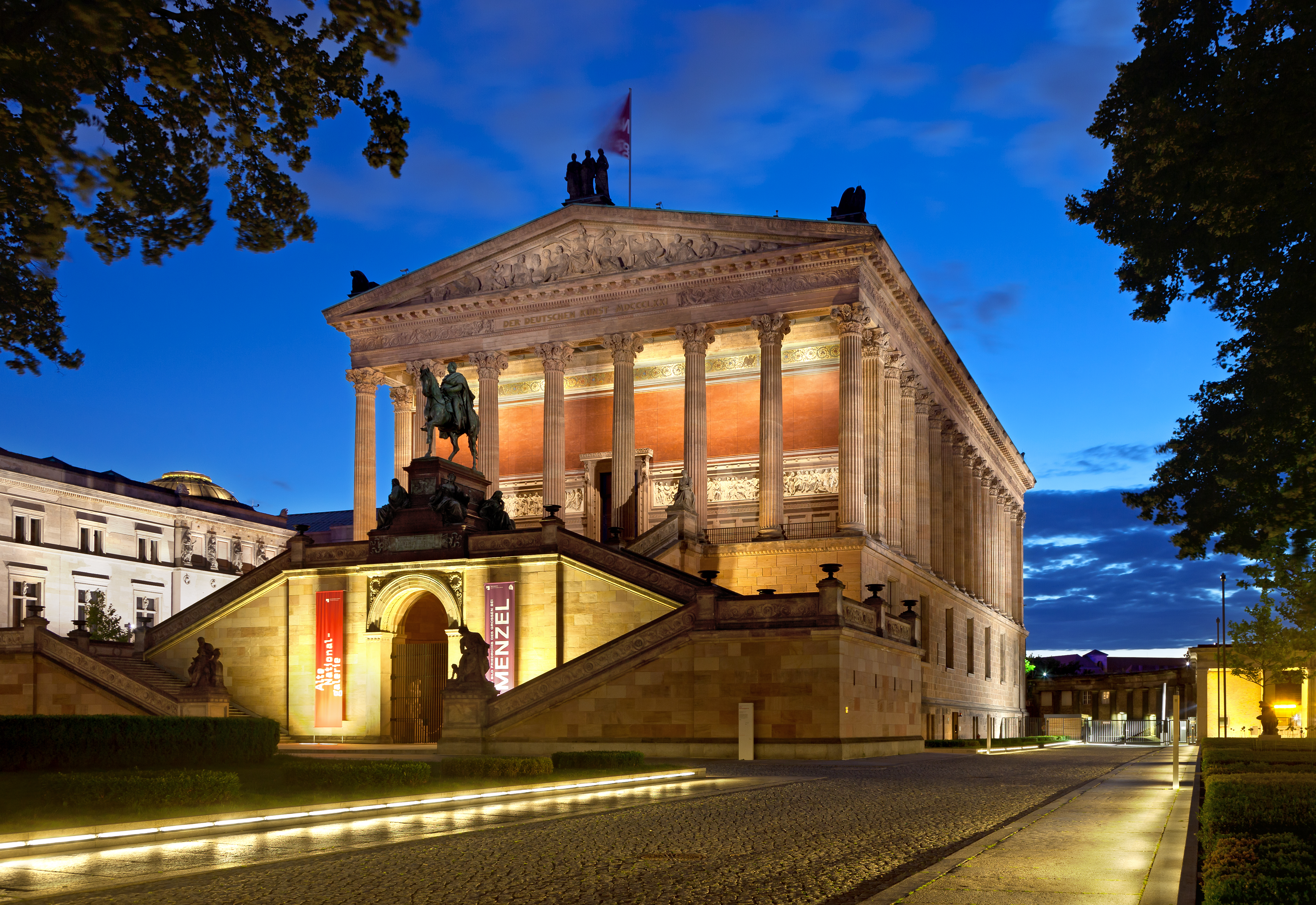
Alte Nationalgalerie

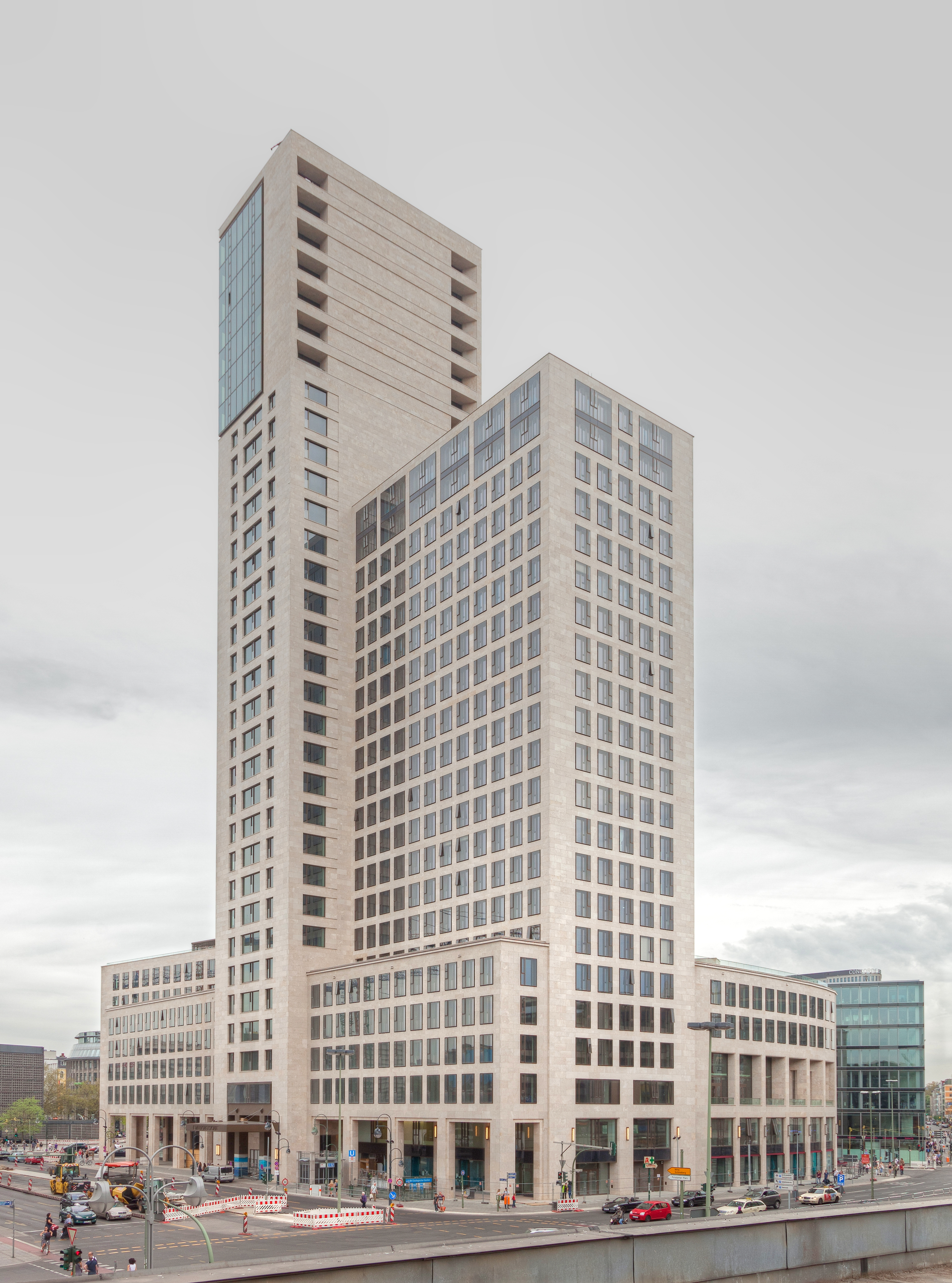
Zoofenster

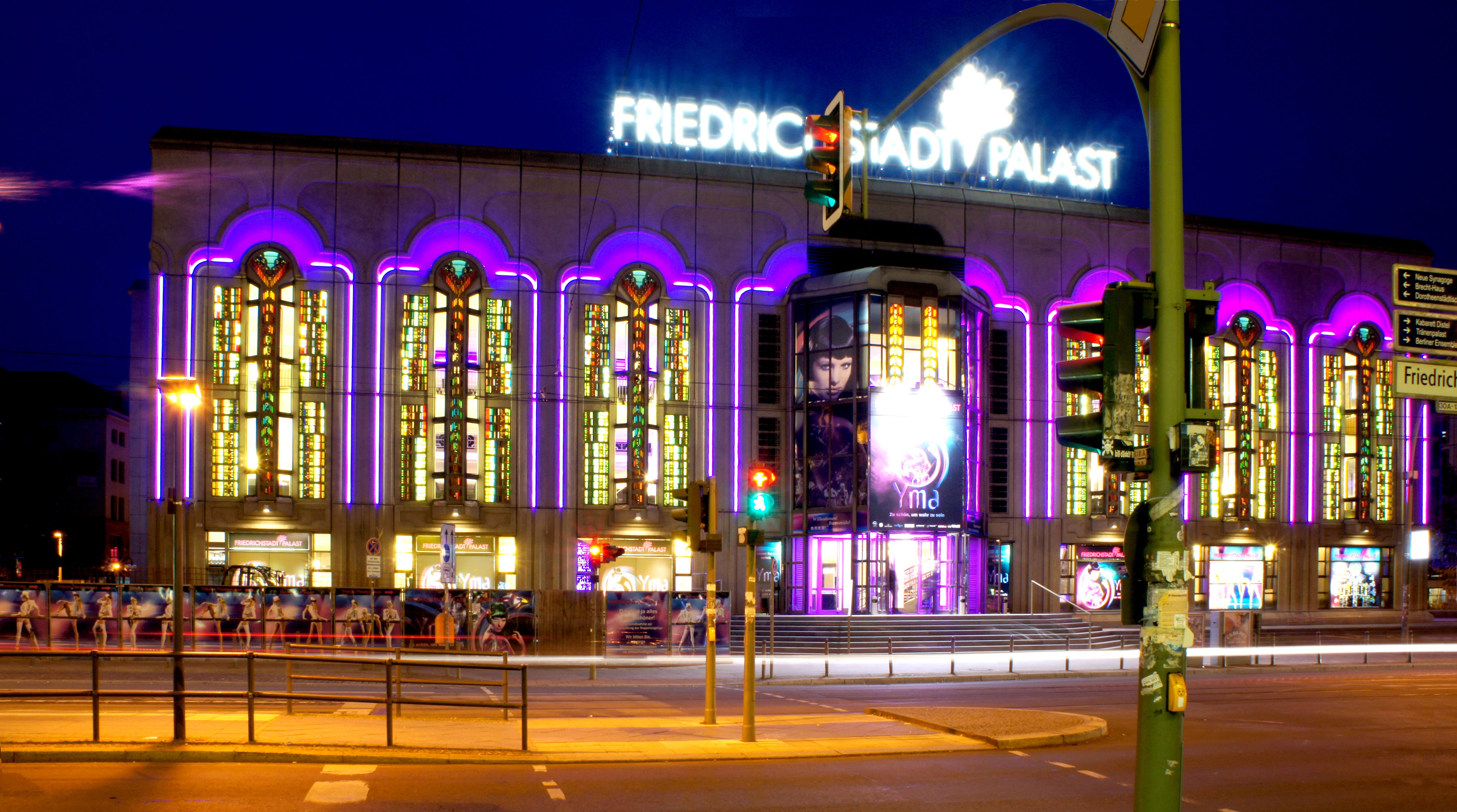
Friedrichstadt-Palast

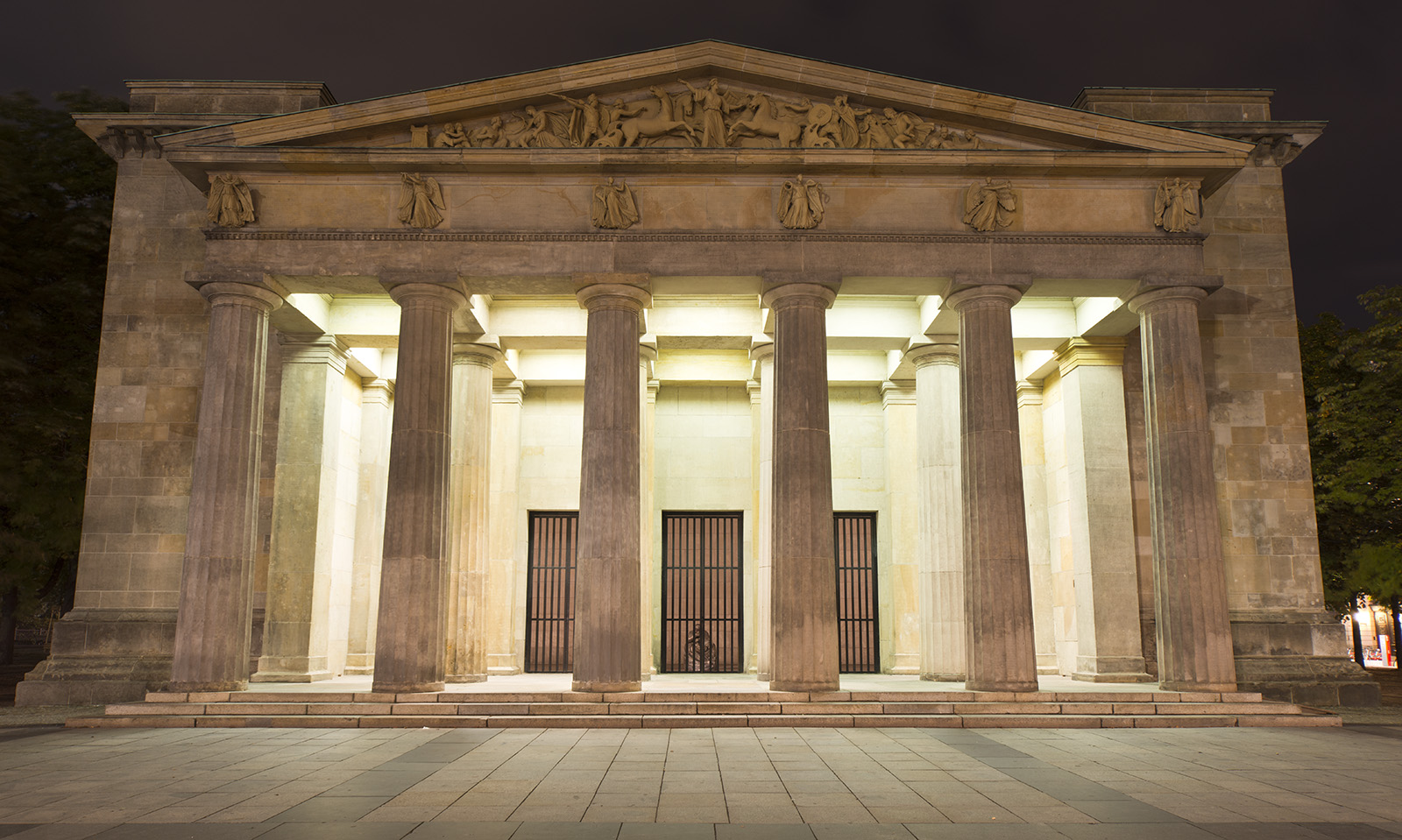
Neue Wache

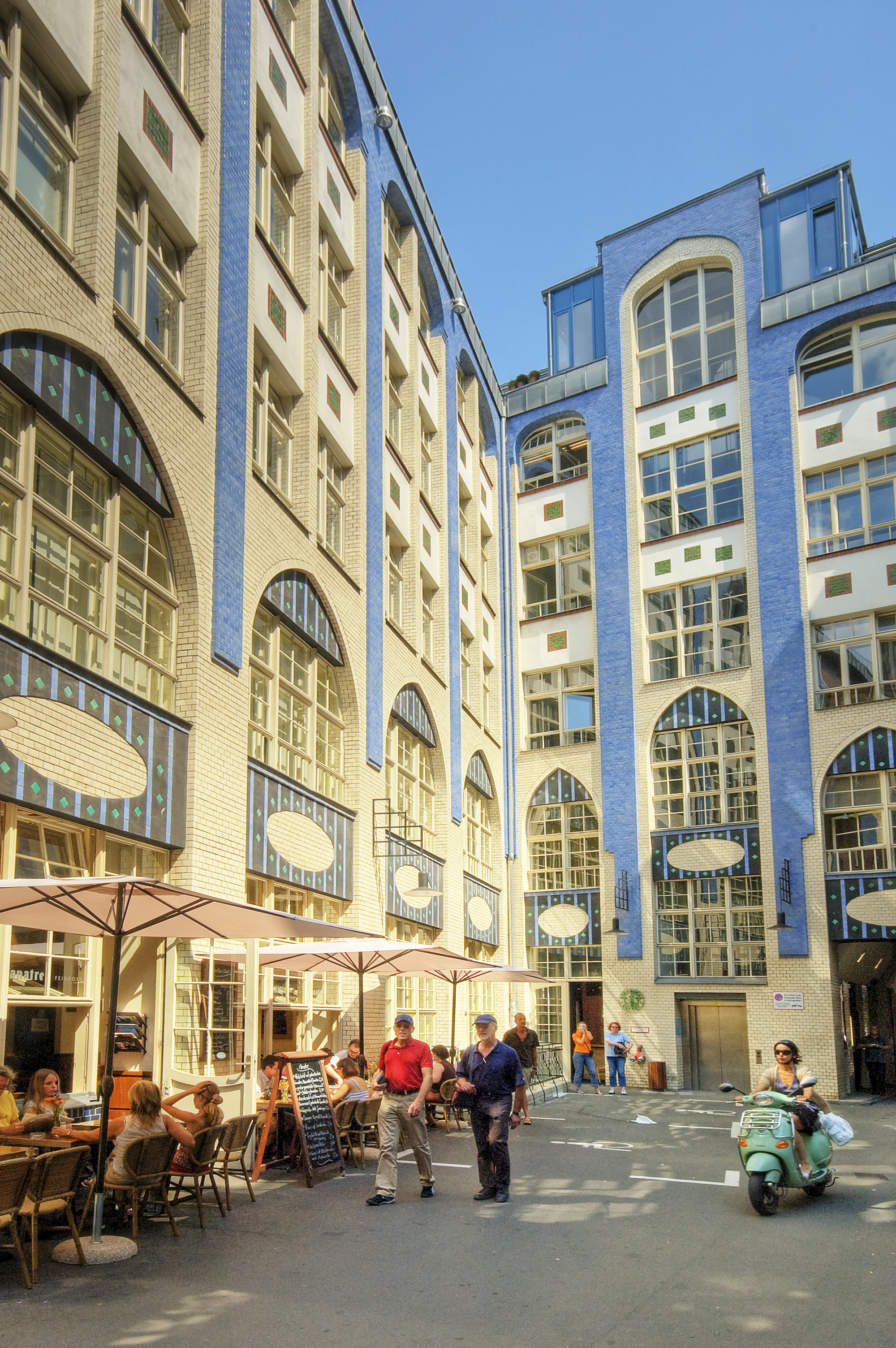
Inside the Hackesche Höfe

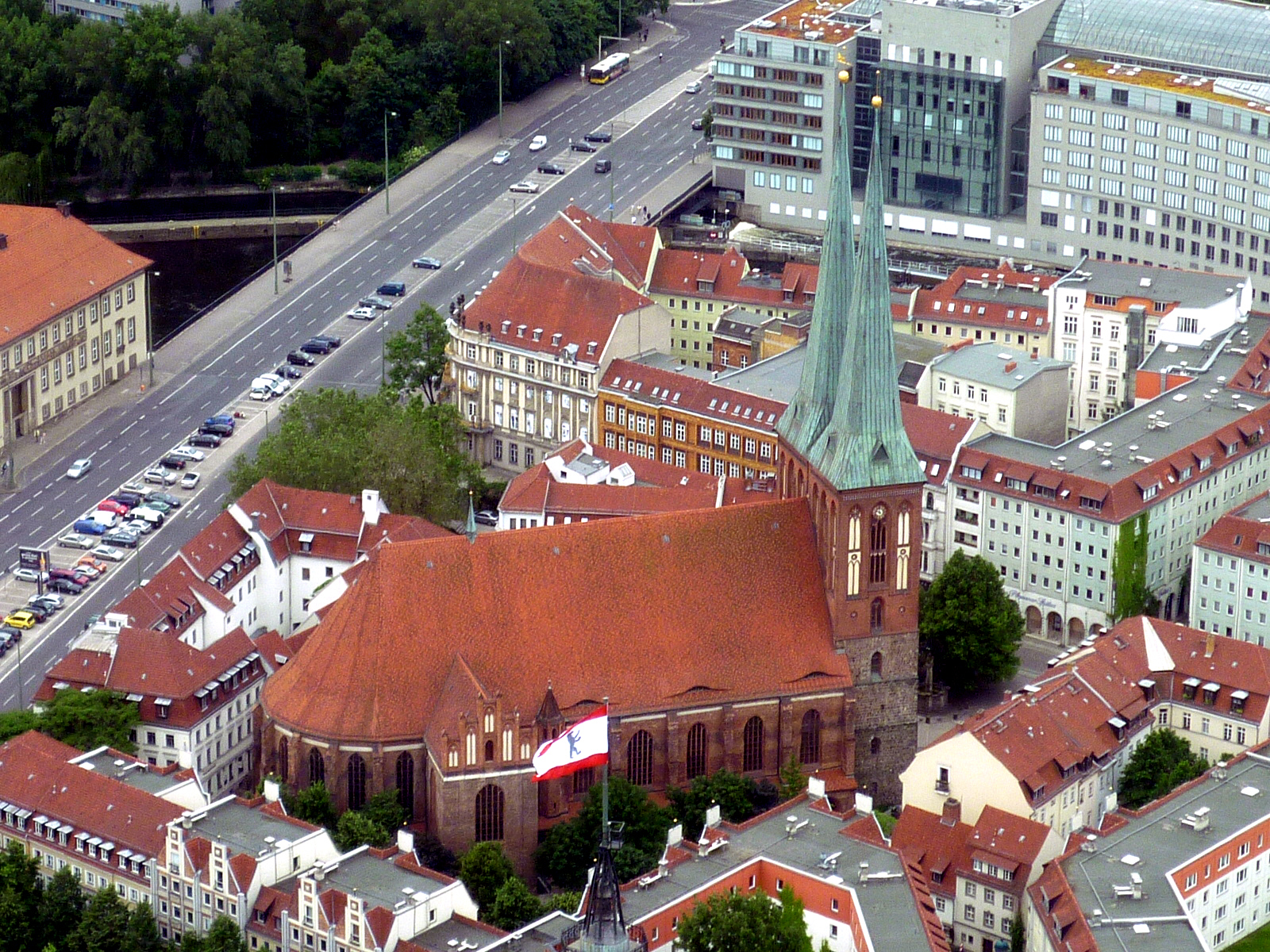
View over Nikolaiviertel with St. Nicholas' Church

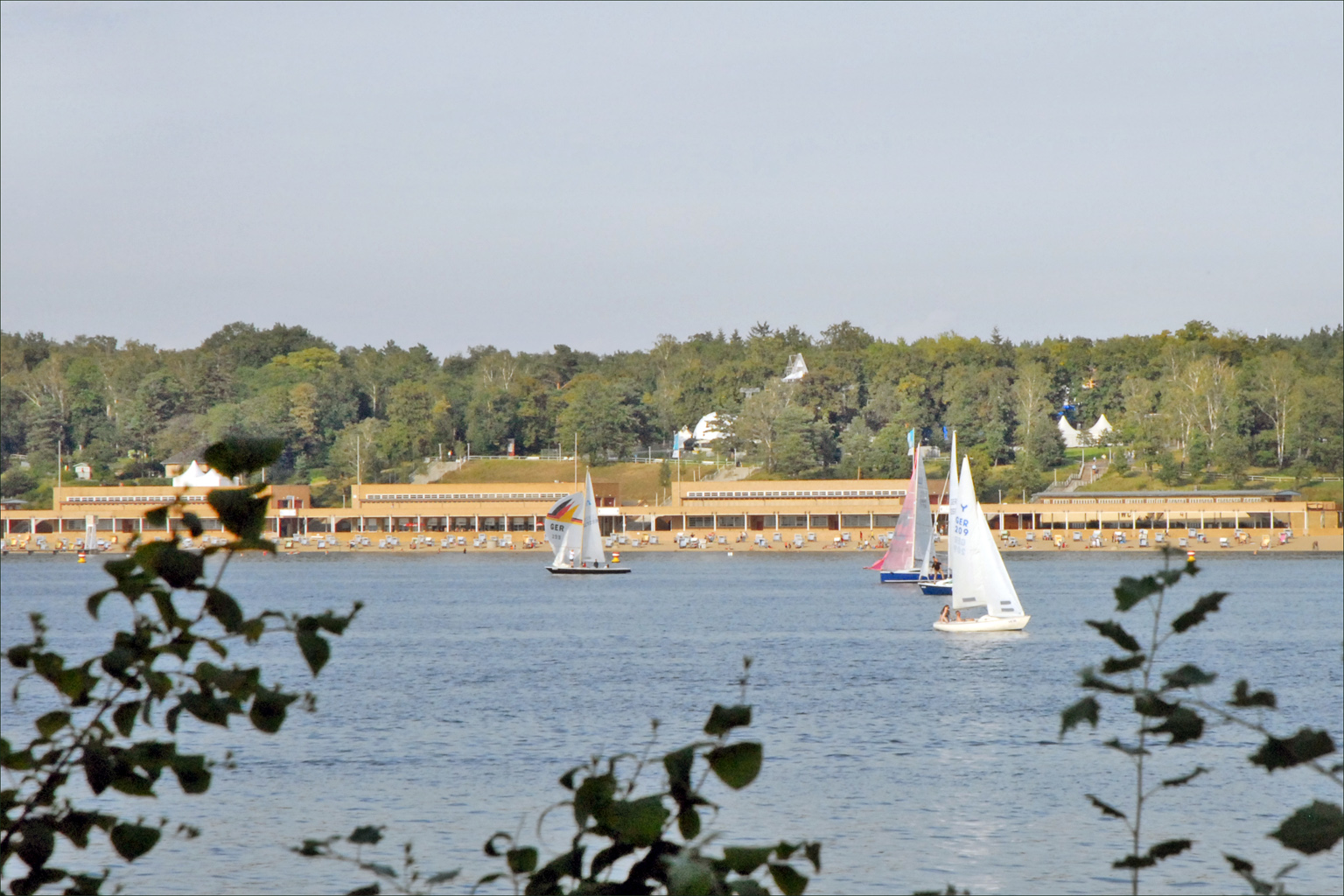
Großer Wannsee

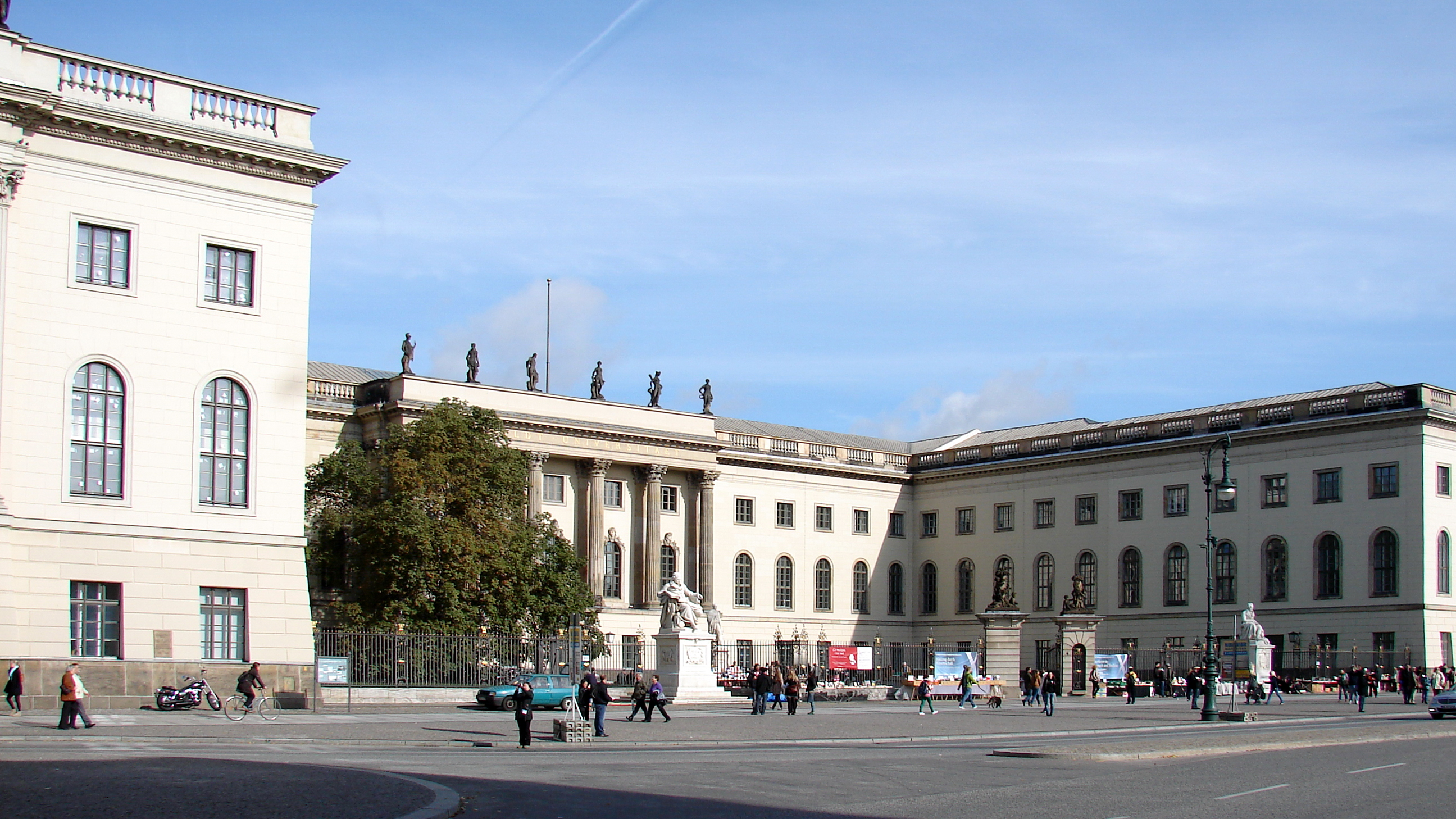
Humboldt Universität

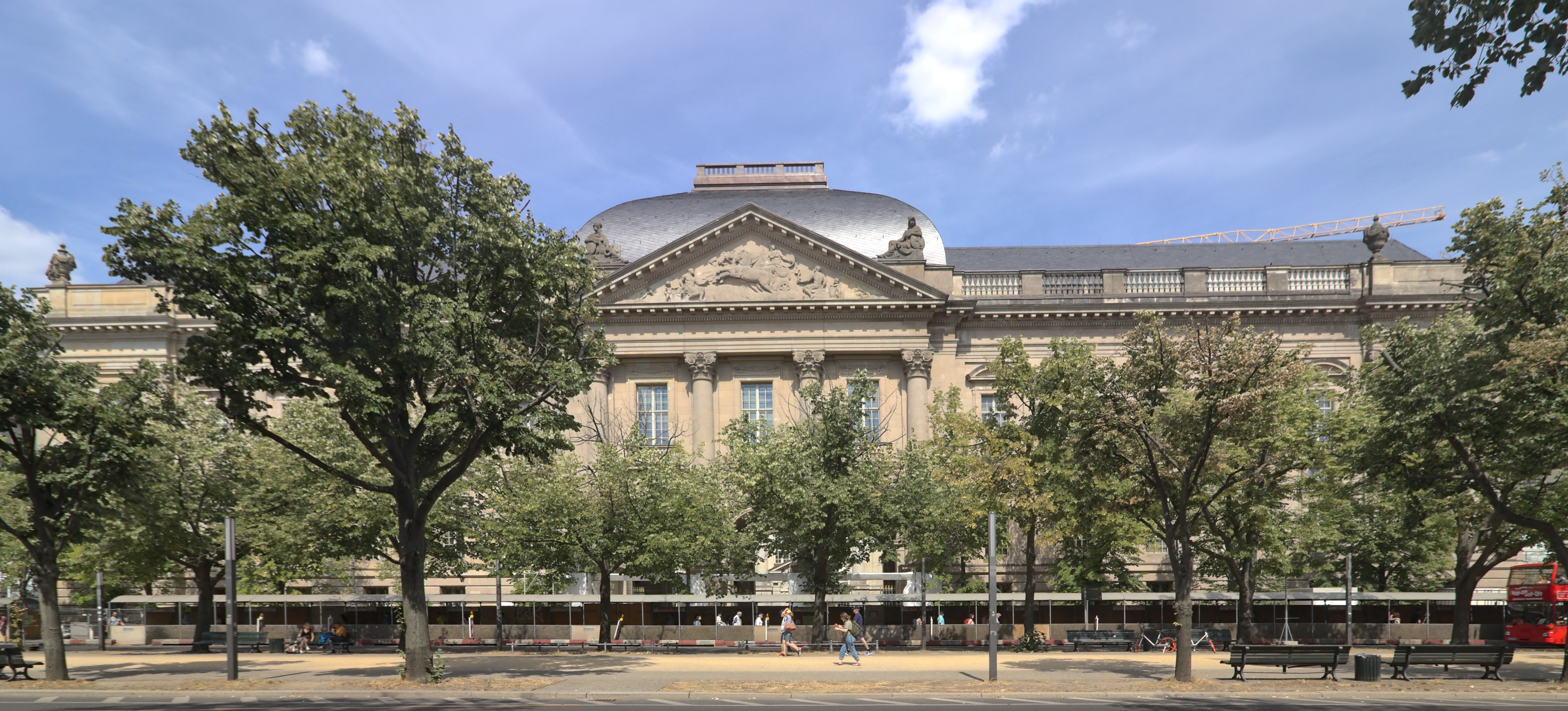
Staatsbibliothek Berlin

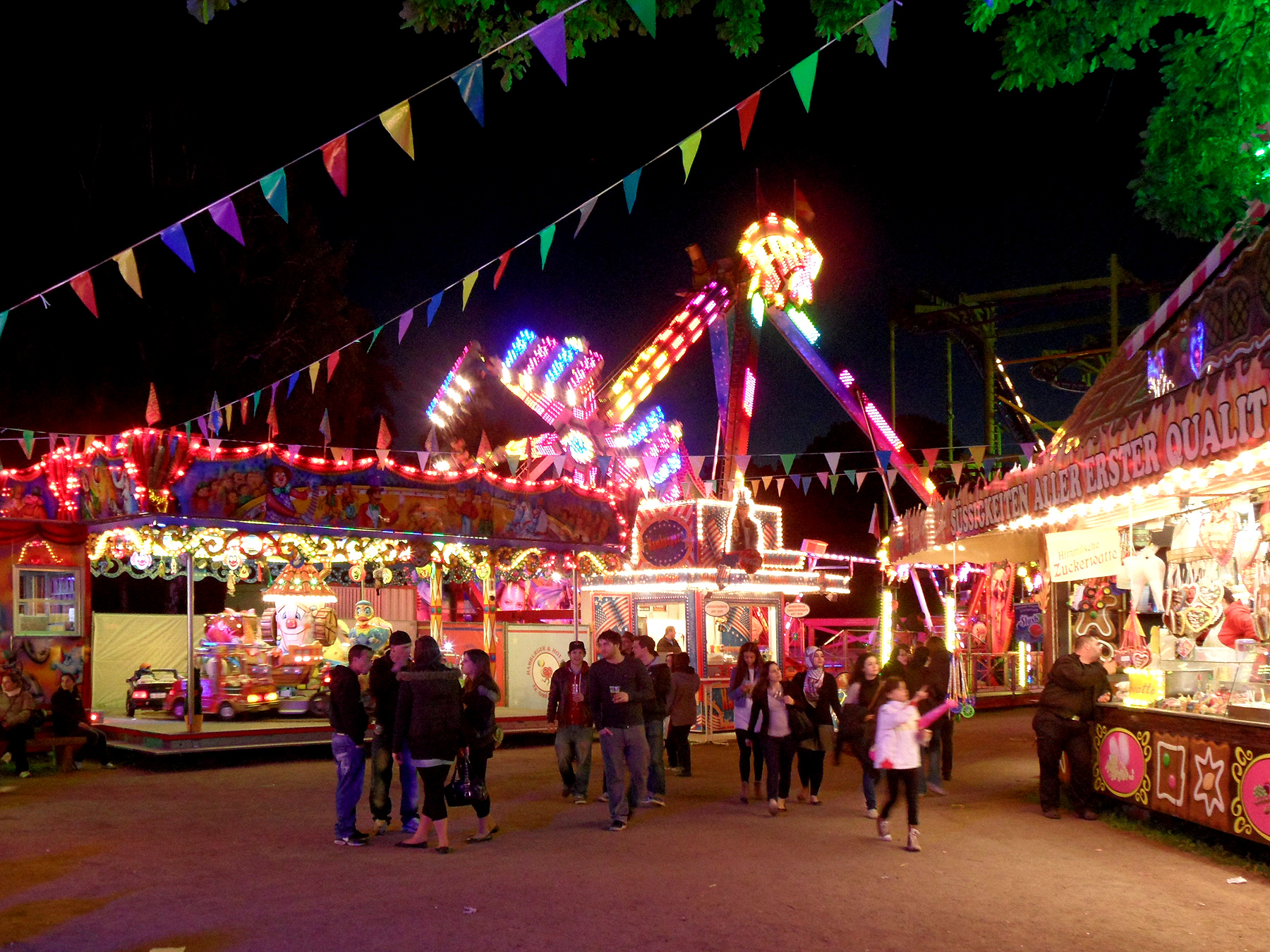
Maientage (Fun fair)

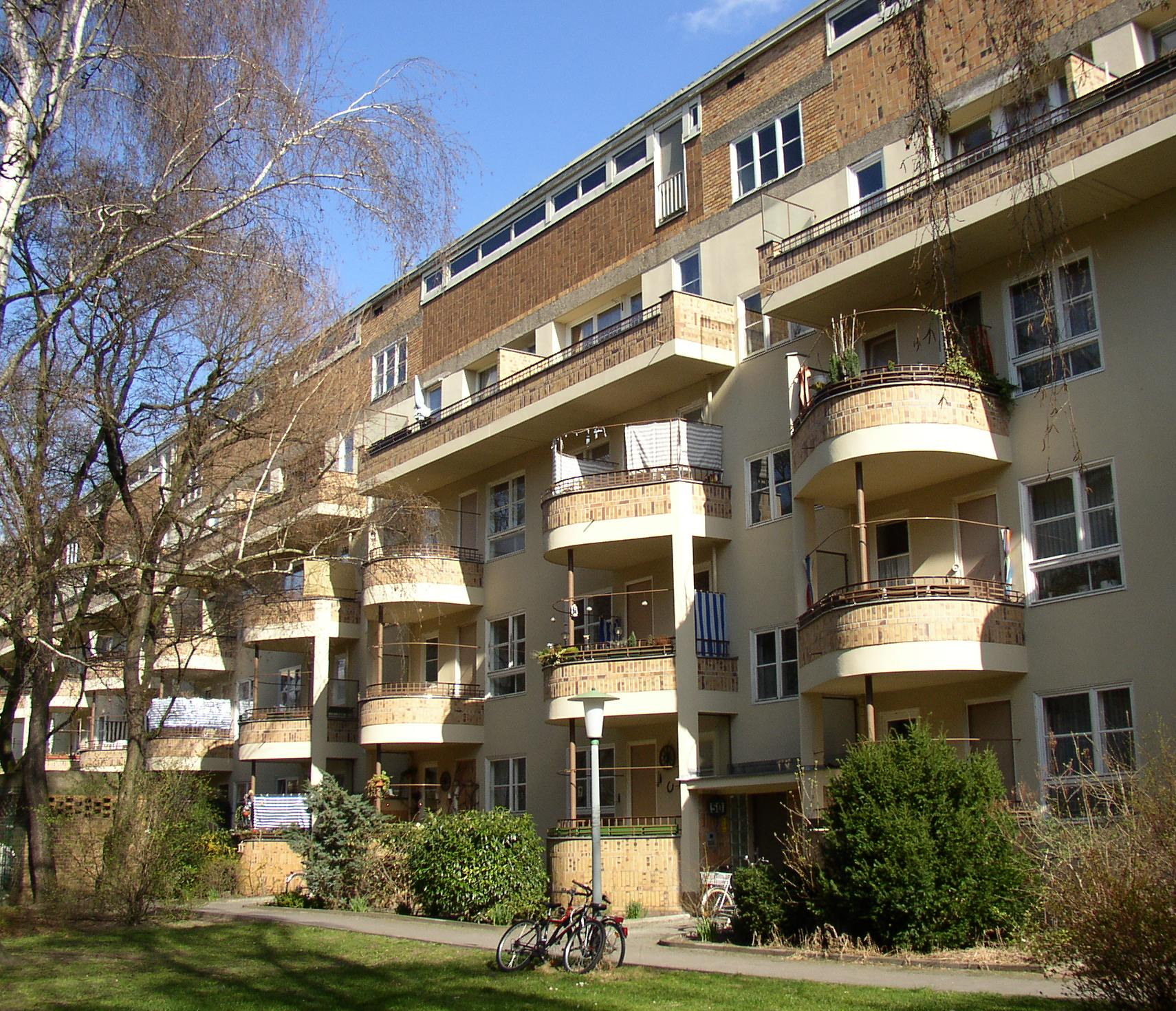
The UNESCO World Heritage Site Berlin Modernism Housing Estates

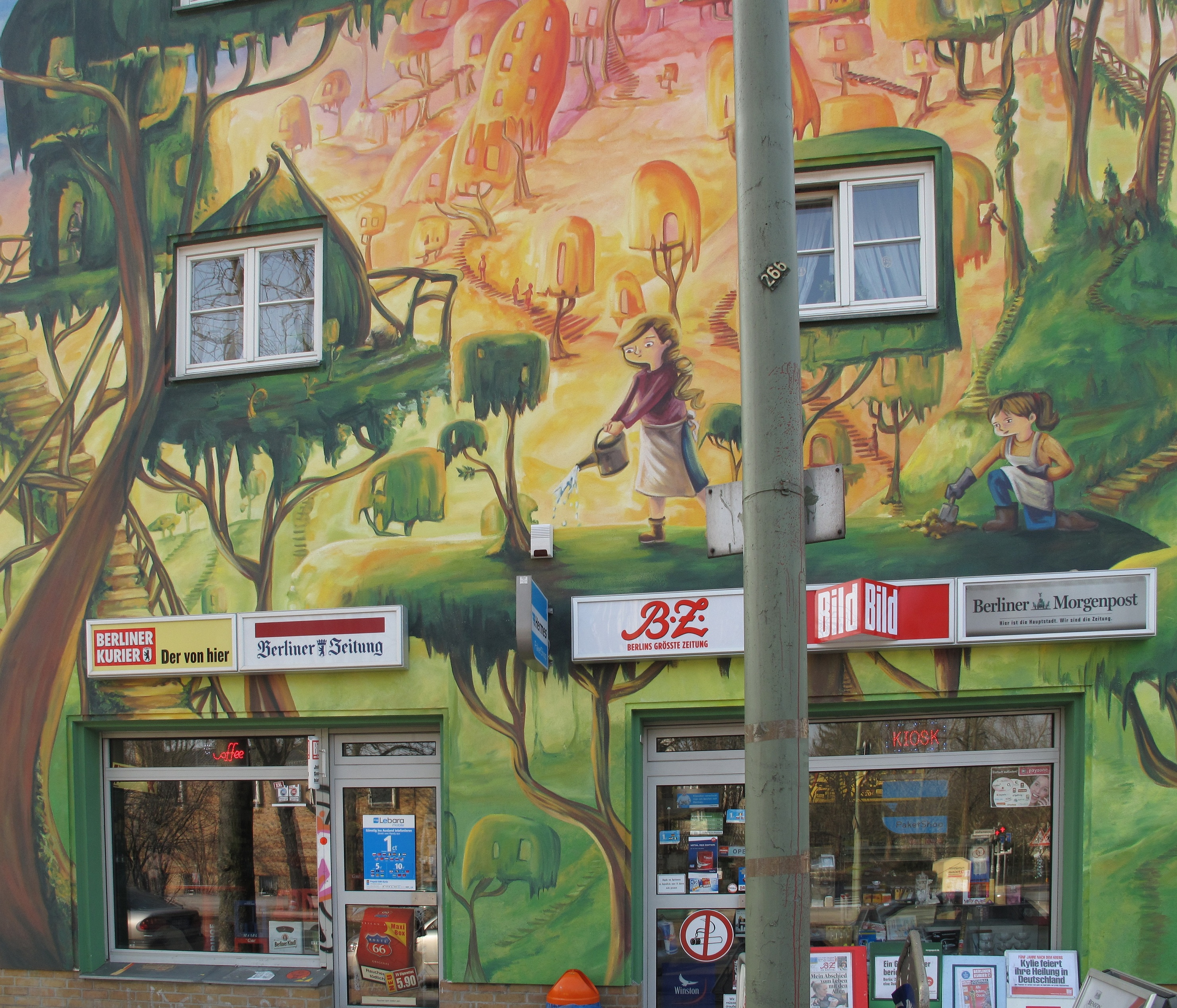
A mural by CitéCréation in the Sonnenallee Street in Neukölln

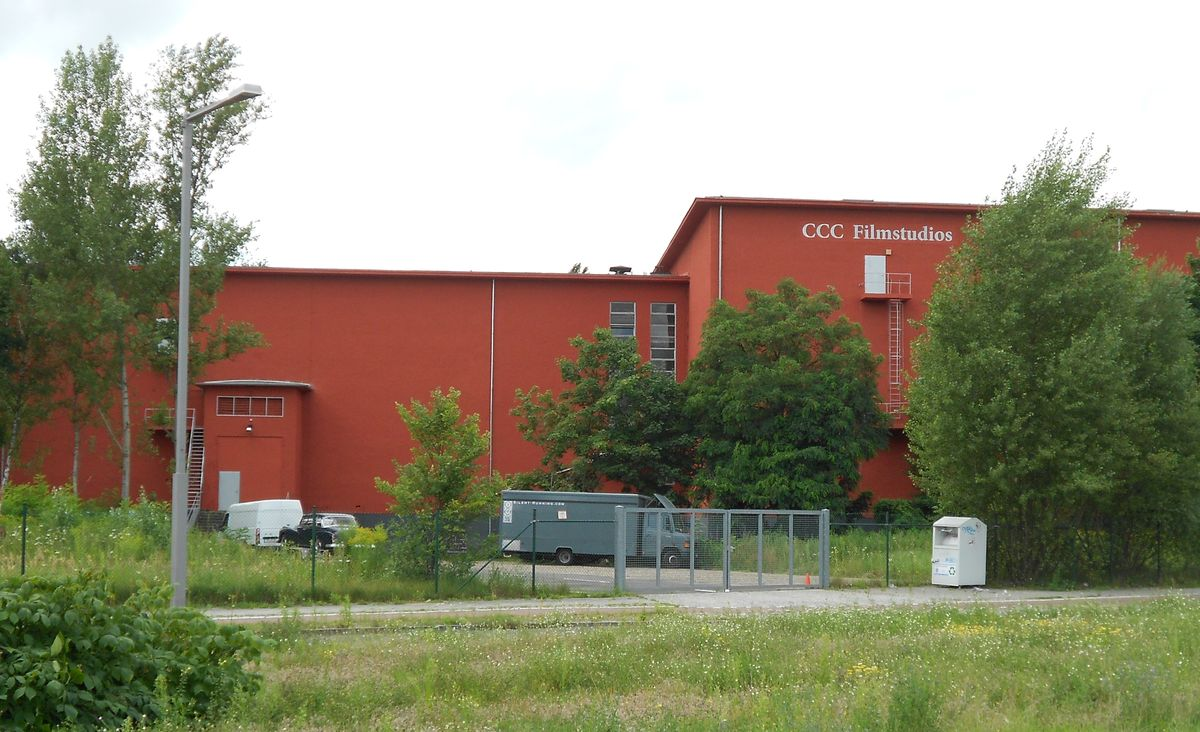
CCC Filmstudios

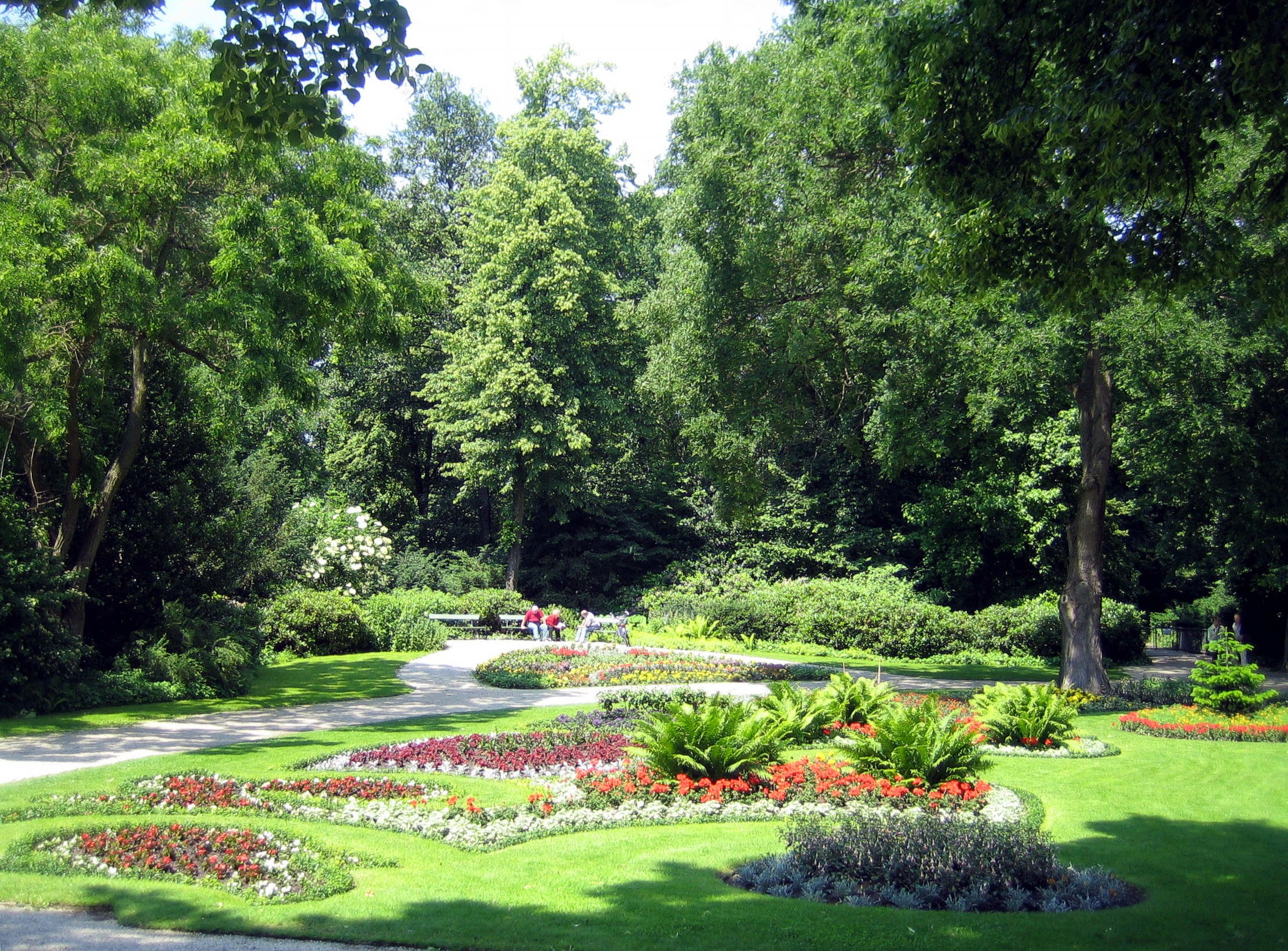
A garden within the large Berlin Tiergarten city park

== See also ==
- Berolina, personification of the city
- Berlinerisch dialect
- List of sights in Berlin
- List of museums and galleries in Berlin
- List of people from Berlin

== Literature ==
- Large, David Clay (2001). Berlin. Basic Books. ISBN 0-465-02632-X.
- Read, Anthony; David Fisher (1994). Berlin Rising: Biography of a City. W.W. Norton. ISBN 0-393-03606-5.
- Roth, Joseph (2004). What I Saw: Reports from Berlin 1920–33. Granta Books. ISBN 1-86207-636-7.
- Taylor, Frederick (2007). The Berlin Wall: 13 August 1961 – 9 November 1989. Bloomsbury Publishing. ISBN 978-0-06-078614-4.
- Maclean, Rory (2014). Berlin: Imagine a City. Weidenfeld & Nicolson. ISBN 978-0-297-84803-5.
