= Berliner =

Berliner may refer to:

== People ==
- A resident of Berlin, Germany
- Berliner (surname)

== Places ==
- Berliner Lake, a lake in Minnesota, United States
- Berliner Philharmonie, concert hall in Berlin, Germany
- Berliner See, a lake in Mecklenburg-Vorpommern, Germany
- Berliner Straße (disambiguation), multiple streets in Germany with the name

== Arts, entertainment, media ==
- Berliner (format), a paper size in newspapers
- Berliner Abendblatt, the leading weekly newspaper in Berlin
- Berliner Ensemble, a German theatre company
- Berliner Kurier, a regional daily tabloid
- Berliner Messe, or Berlin Mass, a 1990 mass by Arvo Pärt
- Berliner Morgenpost, 2nd most read newspaper in Berlin
- Berliner Symphoniker, symphony orchestra in Berlin
- Berliner Verkehrsblätter, a journal on public transport in Berlin
- Berliner Woche, advertising weekly in Berlin
- Berliner Zeitung, daily newspaper in Berlin
- The Berliner (film), a 1948 German motion picture directed by Robert A. Stemmle
- The Berliner (magazine), a monthly English-language magazine published in Berlin
- Berliner Film Companie, a former German film and television production company

== Companies, organizations ==
- Berliner AK 07, football club
- Berliner BC 03, former football club
- Berliner FV, football club
- Berliner RC, rugby club
- Berliner Sport-Club, football club
- Berliner Aircraft Company, now Berliner-Joyce Aircraft
- Berliner Gramophone, a record label
- Berliner Motor Corporation, former US motorcycle distributor founded by the Berliner Brothers

== Foods ==
- Berliner (doughnut), a pastry
- Berliner Pilsner, a brand of beer
- Berliner Weisse, a regional style of beer from Northern Germany

== Transport ==
- Berliner (train), former City Night Line service on the Zürich-Berlin Ostbahnhof route
- The Berliner, a British military train (1945–1991) that terminated at Berlin-Charlottenburg station
- Berliner Helicopter, a series of experimental helicopters built by Henry Berliner
- Berliner Verkehrsbetriebe, the public transport company of Berlin

== Other uses ==
- Berliner, a former regional currency in Berlin
- Berliner, a type of tent for emergency bivouac
- "Ich bin ein Berliner", a famous speech by John F. Kennedy
- Berliners, a colloquial name for historic 19th-century water pumps in Szczecin, Poland

== See also ==
- Berlin (disambiguation)
- East Berlin (disambiguation)
- West Berlin (disambiguation)
- New Berlin (disambiguation)
