= List of place names of German origin in the United States =

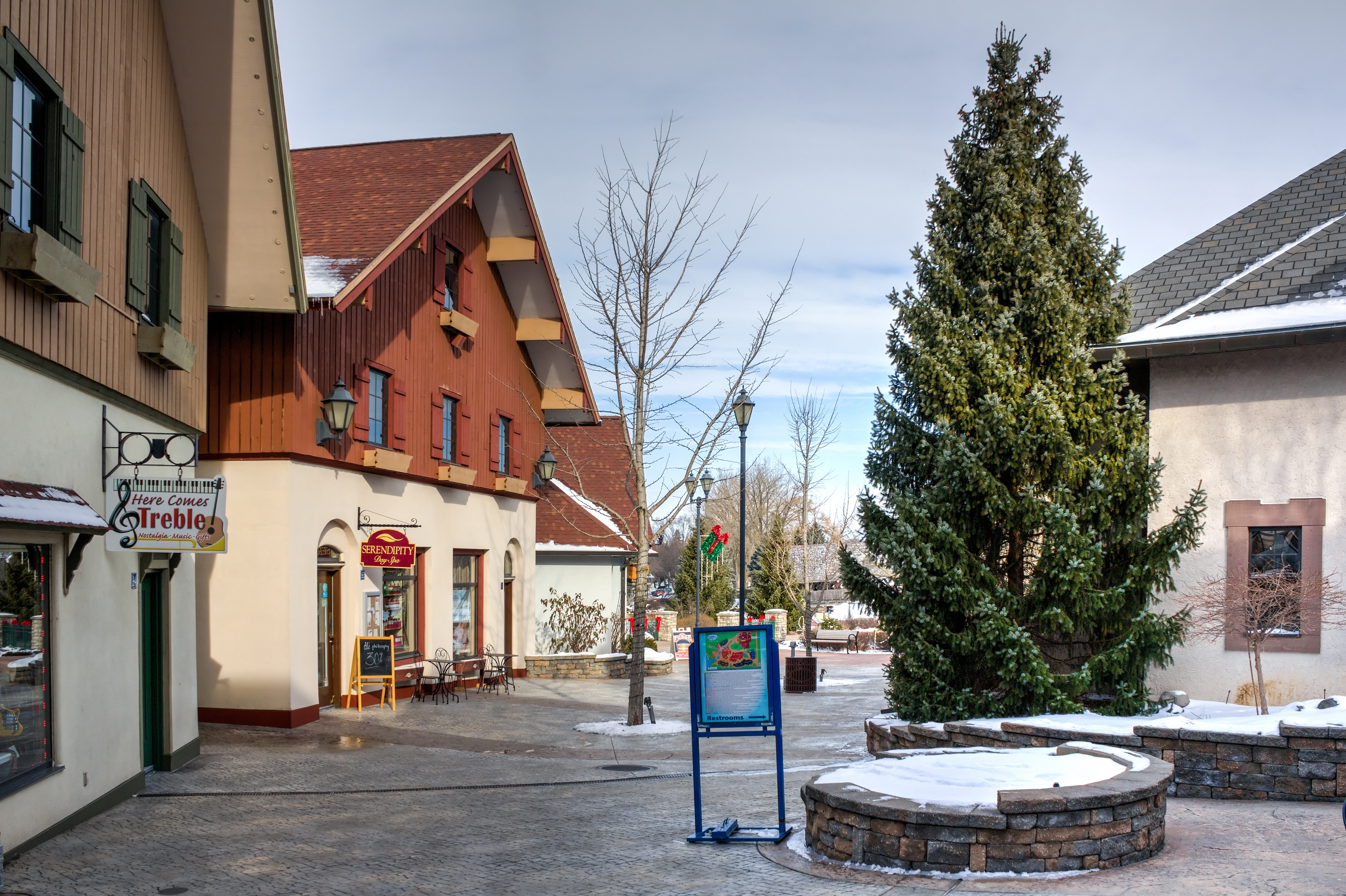
Frankenmuth, Michigan is a city with many German heritages; its name is coined with German words Franken ("Franconia") and Mut (formerly spelled as Muth, "courage").

Relatively few place names in the United States have names of German origin, unlike Spanish or French names. Many of the German town names are in the Midwest, due to high German settlement in the 1800s. Many of the names in New York and Pennsylvania originated with the German Palatines (called Pennsylvania Dutch), who immigrated in the 18th century.

The entry of the United States into World War I was followed by anti-German sentiment, and local names were often changed to reflect this. Only a handful U.S. cities with German-origin names have populations greater than 100,000. Non-German city names with the suffix "-burg," which in English is partly an altered form the native English suffix -burgh and also partly derived from the related German word, "Burg," meaning "castle", is common for town and city names throughout the United States, such as Spartanburg, South Carolina and were not included.

Place name	State	Origin/notes
Altenburg	Missouri	Named after Saxe-Altenburg, meaning "old castle".
Altdorf	Wisconsin	Named after Altdorf, Switzerland, meaning "old village."
Altman	Colorado	
Altorf	Illinois	Named after Altdorf, Switzerland, meaning "old village."
Anaheim	California	A blend of "Ana", after the nearby Santa Ana River, and "heim", a common Germanic place name compound originally meaning "home".
Anaheim Island	California	Named after Anaheim.
Anhalt	Texas	Named after the Principality of Anhalt.
Arendtsville	Pennsylvania	Named after John Arendt.
Augusta	Georgia	Named after Princess Augusta of Saxe-Gotha.
Augusta	Illinois	Named after Augusta, Georgia, which derives its name from Princess Augusta of Saxe-Gotha.
Augusta	Kentucky	Named after Augusta County, Virginia, which derives its name from Princess Augusta of Saxe-Gotha.
Augusta	Minnesota	Named after Augusta Poppitz, the wife of Ernst Poppitz, an early settler from Germany.
Augusta	Missouri	Founded by Heinrich Knoernschild, a German immigrant. There are unproven claims that it was named after a local man's wife.
Augusta County	Virginia	Named after Princess Augusta of Saxe-Gotha.
Augsburg	Arkansas	Named after Augsburg, Germany.
Augsburg	Illinois	Named after Augsburg, Germany.
Ault	Colorado	Named after Alexander Ault, a local of German descent.
Austerlitz	Kentucky	Named after the Battle of Austerlitz.
Austerlitz	New York	Named by then-State Senator and future-President Martin Van Buren after the Battle of Austerlitz, both due to his admiration of Napoleon and his desire to one-up a political rival who recently named a town after the Battle of Waterloo.
Baden	Georgia	Named after Baden.
Baden	California	Neighborhood in South San Francisco, California.
Baden	Maryland	Named after the Baden region.
Baden	Pennsylvania	Named after the German town of Baden-Baden.
Baden, St. Louis	Missouri	Neighborhood in St. Louis, Missouri named after the region of Baden.
Bamberg	South Carolina	Named after William Seaborn Bamberg, whose grandfather was an immigrant from Germany.
Bamberg County	South Carolina	Named after Francis Marion Bamberg.
Bavaria	Kansas	Named after the region of Bavaria in Germany.
Bavaria	Wisconsin	Named after the region of Bavaria in Germany.
Lake Bavaria	Minnesota	Named after the region of Bavaria in Germany.
Bechtelsville	Pennsylvania	
Bern	Idaho	Named after Bern.
Bern	Kansas	Named after Bern.
Bern	Wisconsin	Named after the region of Bavaria in Germany, with German Bayern adjusted to English spelling.
Bern Township	Ohio	Named after Bern.
Bern Township	Pennsylvania	Named after Bern.
Berne	Indiana	Named after Bern by Swiss immigrants from Münsterberg.
Berne	Iowa	Named after Bern.
Berne	Minnesota	Named after Bern.
Berne	Pennsylvania	Named after Bern.
Berne Township	Ohio	Named after Bern.
Bernville	Pennsylvania	Named after the birthplace of Stephanus Umbenhauer, a Swiss-German immigrant.
Beckemeyer	Illinois	Named after the Beckemeyer family.
Bergheim	Texas	Founded by Andreas Engel, an Austrian immigrant. It means "mountain home" in German.
Bergholz	Ohio	German for "mountain grove," named after the owner of a local mine.
Berlin	California	The former name of Genevra, California.
Berlin	Connecticut	Named after the German capital city, Berlin.
Berlin	Georgia	Named after the German capital city, Berlin.
Berlin	Illinois	Named after the German capital city, Berlin.
Berlin	Indiana	Named after the German capital city, Berlin. It is now a ghost town.
Berlin	Kansas	Named after the German capital city, Berlin.
Berlin	Kentucky	Named after the German capital city, Berlin.
Berlin	Maryland	Named after the German capital city, Berlin.
Berlin	Massachusetts	Named after the German capital city, Berlin.
Berlin	Michigan	An unincorporated community known as Berlin until 1919, and the name remains prominent in the area despite it now officially being named Marne.
Berlin	Nebraska	The former name of Otoe, Nebraska, anti-German sentiment extended to a town that bore the name of Germany's capital. A 1918 series of fires that destroyed a block of the town's main street was attributed to anti-German crusaders. In October 1918, less than a month before the war's end, the town's name was changed to its current Otoe. Berlin Precinct was left unchanged, however.
Berlin	Nevada	A ghost town named after the German capital city, Berlin.
Berlin	New Hampshire	Named after the German capital city, Berlin.
Berlin	New Jersey	Named after the German capital city, Berlin.
Berlin	New York	Named after the German capital city, Berlin.
Berlin	North Dakota	Named after the German capital city, Berlin.
Berlin, Holmes County	Ohio	Named after the German capital city, Berlin.
Berlin, Williams County	Ohio	Named after the German capital city, Berlin.
Berlin	Oregon	Named after the German capital city, Berlin.
Berlin	Pennsylvania	Named after the German capital city, Berlin.
Berlin	Tennessee	An unincorporated town named after the German capital city, Berlin.
Berlin	Texas	An unincorporated community named after the German capital city, Berlin.
Berlin	Vermont	Named after the German capital city, Berlin.
Berlin	West Virginia	Named after the German capital city, Berlin.
Berlin	Wisconsin	Named after the German capital city, Berlin.
Berlin, Green Lake County	Wisconsin	Named after the German capital city, Berlin.
Berlin, Marathon County	Wisconsin	Named after the German capital city, Berlin.
Berlin Heights	Ohio	Named after the German capital city, Berlin.
Berlin Township, Bureau County	Illinois	Named after the German capital city, Berlin.
Berlin Township, Ionia County	Michigan	Named after the German capital city, Berlin.
Berlin Township, St. Clair County	Michigan	Named after the German capital city, Berlin.
Berlin Charter Township	Michigan	Named after the German capital city, Berlin.
Berlin Township	Minnesota	Named after the German capital city, Berlin.
Berlin Township	New Jersey	Named after the German capital city, Berlin.
Berlin Township, Cass County	North Dakota	Named after the German capital city, Berlin.
Berlin Township, Sheridan County	North Dakota	Named after the German capital city, Berlin.
Berlin Township, Wells County	North Dakota	Named after the German capital city, Berlin.
Berlin Township, Delaware County	Ohio	Named after the German capital city, Berlin.
Berlin Township, Erie County	Ohio	Named after the German capital city, Berlin.
Berlin Township, Holmes County	Ohio	Named after the German capital city, Berlin.
Berlin Township, Knox County	Ohio	Named after the German capital city, Berlin.
Berlin Township, Mahoning County	Ohio	Named after the German capital city, Berlin.
Berlin Township	Pennsylvania	Named after the German capital city, Berlin.
Berne	Indiana	Was settled by Mennonite Swiss immigrants, who named it after the capital city of Switzerland, Bern.
Berne	New York	Originally spelt "Bern," the town was initially settled by German Palatine refugees.
Berne	Ohio	Named after the city of Bern by its first settler, a Swiss immigrant.
Bettendorf	Iowa	Named for Joseph and William Bettendorf, sons of Michael, born Betteldorf in Nohn in the German Eifel region.
Biehle	Missouri	Founded by catholic immigrants from Baden, the village was named after an early settler named Maurus Biehle, who donated land to the settlement.
Bingen	Washington	Named for Bingen am Rhein in 1892 by founder P. J. Suksdorf
Birkenfeld	Oregon	Named after Anton Birkenfeld, a German immigrant who founded the community in 1910.
Bismarck	Arkansas	Named after Otto von Bismarck, the first chancellor of the German Empire.
Bismarck	Illinois	In order to be closer to a nearby railroad, the town of Franklin moved onto land donated by Charles S. Young and Dr. John B. Holloway. Young renamed the town after Otto von Bismarck, a subject of his admiration.
Bismarck	Missouri	In an attempt to attract German immigrants to the nearby St. Louis, Iron Mountain and Southern Railway, the city was named after German chancellor Otto von Bismarck. During World War I, a group of citizens who saw the name as "un-American" petitioned to change the name of the city to "Loyal," but the proposal was rejected by most of the city's residents and the original name remained.
Bismarck	North Dakota	In 1873, the Northern Pacific Railway renamed the city as Bismarck, in honor of German chancellor Otto von Bismarck. Railroad officials hoped to attract German immigrant settlers to the area and German investment in the railroad.
Boerne	Texas	Named after Ludwig Börne.
Brandenburg	Kentucky	Named after Solomon Brandenburg.
Brandt	South Dakota	Named after Reverend P. O. Brandt, a man of German descent.
Bremen	Alabama	Named after Bremen, Germany.
Bremen	Georgia	Named after Bremen, Germany. It was initially named "Kramer" after a German immigrant who ran a local vineyard. Eventually, Kramer himself requested the town be renamed to "Bremen" in honor of the German city.
Bremen	Indiana	Named after Bremen, Germany due to many of the early settlers being German natives.
Bremen	Kentucky	Settled by German immigrants, who named it after Bremen, Germany
Bremen	Maine	Mostly settled by German immigrants, who named it after Bremen, Germany when the town was incorporated on February 19, 1828.
Bremen	North Dakota	Named after Bremen, Germany.
Bremen	Ohio	Named after Bremen, Germany.
Bremen Township	Minnesota	Named after Bremen, Germany.
Bremen Township, Cook County	Illinois	Named after Bremen, Germany.
Bremerton	Washington	Planned and named by German immigrant and Seattle entrepreneur William Bremer in 1891
Breslau	Nebraska	Named after Breslau, Prussia.
Breslau	Pennsylvania	Named after Breslau, a previously-German city in Silesia.
Breslau	Texas	Named after Breslau, a previously-German city in Silesia.
Brunswick County	North Carolina	Named after Brunswick-Lüneburg, a now-defunct sovereign duchy within the Holy Roman Empire, due to the fact that was held by the British Kings of the House of Hanover.
Brunswick County	Virginia	Named after Brunswick-Lüneburg, a now-defunct sovereign duchy within the Holy Roman Empire, due to the fact that was held by the British Kings of the House of Hanover.
Cappeln	Missouri	Named after Cappeln, Germany.
Carlsbad	California	The German name of the Czech spa town of Karlovy Vary.
Caroline County	Virginia	Named after Caroline of Ansbach.
Cassel	Wisconsin	Named after Kassel, Germany.
Catherine	Kansas	Named after the Volga German town of Katharinenstadt.
Charlotte	North Carolina	Charlotte of Mecklenburg-Strelitz, of the ruling family of a duchy in northern Germany.
Charlottesville	Virginia	Named after Charlotte of Mecklenburg-Strelitz.
Charlotte County	Virginia	Named after Charlotte of Mecklenburg-Strelitz.
Coburg	Oregon	Originally named "Diamond." It was renamed after a stallion who in turn was named after the district of Coburg in Bavaria, from which it was imported.
Cologne	Minnesota	Named after Cologne, (Köln), Germany.
Colmar	Illinois	Named after Colmar, an Alsatian city historically inhabited by Germans.
Cottbus	Missouri	Second largest city in Brandenburg.
Darmstadt	Indiana	Named by German immigrants after Darmstadt, Germany.
Darmstadt	Illinois	Named after Darmstadt, Germany.
Danube	New York	Named after the Danube River (German: Donau) in the 18th century by German Palatine immigrants.
Danzig	North Dakota	Named after Danzig, Prussia.
Deckers	Colorado	
DeKalb County	Alabama	Baron Johann de Kalb (1721–1780), a German soldier who fought on the side of the Americans in the Revolutionary War.
DeKalb County	Georgia	Baron Johann de Kalb (1721–1780), a German soldier who fought on the side of the Americans in the Revolutionary War.
DeKalb County	Illinois	Baron Johann de Kalb (1721–1780), a German soldier who fought on the side of the Americans in the Revolutionary War.
DeKalb County	Indiana	Baron Johann de Kalb (1721–1780), a German soldier who fought on the side of the Americans in the Revolutionary War.
DeKalb County	Missouri	Baron Johann de Kalb (1721–1780), a German soldier who fought on the side of the Americans in the Revolutionary War.
DeKalb County	Tennessee	Baron Johann de Kalb (1721–1780), a German soldier who fought on the side of the Americans in the Revolutionary War.
Detmold	Missouri	Named after Detmold, Germany.
Dieterich	Illinois	Named after Michael Dieterich, a German-American.
Dissen	Missouri	Named after Dissen, Germany.
Dresbach	Minnesota	Named after George B. Dresbach, a German-American politician.
Dresden	Kansas	Named after Dresden, Germany.
Dresden	Missouri	Named after Dresden, Germany.
Dresden	Ohio	Named after Dresden, Germany.
Dresden	Tennessee	Named after Dresden, Germany.
Dutzow	Missouri	Established by the Berlin Society in the 1830s and named after the village of Dutzow in the municipality of Kneese, Germany, due to it being the ancestral home of one of its first settlers, a German named Johann Wilhelm Bock.
East Berlin	Pennsylvania	Named after Berlin, Germany.
Eckert	Colorado	Named after Dora Eckert.
Edler	Colorado	
Ehrenfeld	Pennsylvania	Translates to "field of honor" in German.
Ehrhardt	South Carolina	Named after Conrad Ehrhardt, a German immigrant.
Elbe	Washington	Named for Elbe River by founder Henry C. Lutkens
Elbing	Kansas	Named after the formerly Prussian city of Elbing (Polish: Elbląg). Other suggested namesakes were Danzig and Marienburg, both also in Prussia at the time.
Elmendorf	Texas	Founded in 1885 and named after Henry Elmendorf, a German Texan (German: Deutschtexaner) and the former mayor of San Antonio.
Emden	Illinois	Because many of its residents immigrated from German villages along the Ems river, it was named after Emden, Germany.
Emden	Missouri	Named after a local post office established in 1888, which itself was named after Emden, Germany.
Enderlin	North Dakota	Possibly from the German phrase "End der Line," meaning "end of the line."
Ephrata	Pennsylvania	Named by German settlers from Eberbach after Ephrath (German: Efrata), an old name of Bethlehem.
Erdenheim	Pennsylvania	Named after a nearby farm which was founded in 1765 by Johannes Georg Hocker.
Erlanger	Kentucky	Named after the Parisian bank Emile Erlanger & Co. that was founded by Frédéric Émile d'Erlanger (born Friedrich Emil Erlanger), a German-French banker originally from Frankfurt.
Eshbach	Pennsylvania	
Ettersburg	California	Named after Albert Felix Etter, the locality's founder and a horticulturalist known for his work on strawberry and apple varieties. Etter was the son of a German-speaking Swiss immigrant named Benjamin Etter.
Ferdinand	Vermont	Named after Charles William Ferdinand, Duke of Brunswick (German: Karl Wilhelm Ferdinand von Braunschweig-Wolfenbüttel). The Duke was born in Wolfenbüttel, Germany.
Fischer	Texas	A German Texan community named after its founders, German immigrants Hermann and Otto Fischer.
Flagler	Colorado	Named after Henry Flagler, whose family originated in the Palatinate region of Germany.
Flensburg	Minnesota	Likely named after Flensburg, Germany.
Frankenmuth	Michigan	"Franken" represents the Province of Franconia in the Kingdom of Bavaria, home of the Franks, where the original settlers were from. The German word "Mut" means courage; thus, the name Frankenmuth means "courage of the Franconians."
Frankenstein	Missouri	A combination of the surname of a German pioneer named Gottfried Franken, who donated a tract of land containing a hill to the town, and the German word "Stein" which means "stone."
Frankfort	Indiana	Named by its founders, the three Pence brothers, after Frankfurt in order to honor their German great-grandparents' place of origin.
Frankfort	South Dakota	Likely named after Frankfurt, Germany.
Frankfort Springs	Pennsylvania	
Franz Lake	Washington	
Franzen	Wisconsin	Named after Christian Franzen, a German native.
Freeburg	Illinois	Originally a village called Urbana, it was renamed after Freiburg im Breisgau in 1859 due to it being the place from which many early settlers of the village came.
Freeburg	Minnesota	Named after Freiburg im Breisgau by its mostly-German settlers.
Freeburg	Missouri	Settled by German immigrants in the 1850s, it was later named after Freiburg im Breisgau when it was platted in 1903.
Frederick	Maryland	Sources disagree as to which Frederick the town was named for, but the likeliest candidates are Frederick Calvert, 6th Baron Baltimore (one of the proprietors of Maryland), Frederick Louis, Prince of Wales, or Frederick "The Great" of Prussia. The first names of all three men originated from the English form of the German name Friedrich.
Fredericksburg	Texas	Founded in 1846 by a German Texan member of the Adelsverein, John O. Meusebach (born Otfried Hans Freiherr von Meusebach). It was soon named after Prince Frederick of Prussia. Meusebach would later become the state senator for District 22 of the Texas Senate. The area of Baron's Creek is now named after him. The city is a major hub of Texas German (German: Texasdeutsch), a unique dialect of the German language spoken by some descendants of the original German settlers.
Freistatt	Missouri	
Friedenberg	Missouri	Founded by Bavarian settlers, primarily from Upper Franconia.
Friedensburg	Pennsylvania	
Friedheim	Missouri	Named after the former German town of Friedheim annexed by Poland in 1945
Frohna	Missouri	Named after Niederfrohna, Germany.
Fulda	Indiana	Named after Fulda, Germany.
Fulda	Minnesota	Named after Fulda, Germany.
Gering	Nebraska	Means little or insignificant in German.
Gluckstadt	Mississippi	
Gotha	Florida	Named after the town of Gotha in Thuringia, Germany.
Gotha	Minnesota	Named after the town of Gotha in Thuringia, Germany.
Graefenburg	Pennsylvania	
Graf	Nebraska	
Gratz	Pennsylvania	Named after its founder, Simon Gratz.
Guss Island	Washington	Named for a German shopkeeper
Guttenberg	New Jersey	The municipality takes its name from Johannes Gutenberg, the inventor of the European version of the printing press, though other sources indicate that the name derives from "good village" in German.
Hagerstown	Maryland	Named after Jonathan Hager.
Hahns Peak	Colorado	Named after Joseph Hahn, a German immigrant.
Hahns Peak Village	Colorado	Named after Hahns Peak.
Hamberg	North Dakota	Hambergen – perhaps named after a small village in Lower Saxony.
Hamburg	Arkansas	Named after Hamburg.
Hamburg	California	Named after Hamburg.
Hamburg	Connecticut	Named after Hamburg.
Hamburg	Georgia	Named after Hamburg.
Hamburg	Illinois	Village
Hamburg Precinct, Calhoun County	Illinois	Named after Hamburg.
Hamburg, Clark County	Indiana	Named after Hamburg.
Hamburg, Franklin County	Indiana	Named after Hamburg.
Hamburg	Iowa	Named after Hamburg.
Hamburg	Louisiana	Named after Hamburg.
Hamburg Township	Michigan	Named after Hamburg.
Hamburg	Minnesota	Named after Hamburg.
Hamburg	Missouri	Named after Hamburg.
Hamburg	New Jersey	Named after Hamburg.
Hamburg	New York	Three Places
Hamburg	North Carolina	The former name of Glenville, North Carolina.
Hamburg, Fairfield County	Ohio	Unincorporated community; named after Hamburg.
Hamburg, Preble County	Ohio	Unincorporated community; named after Hamburg.
Hamburg	Pennsylvania	Borough; named after Hamburg.
Hamburg, Aiken County	South Carolina	
Hamburg, Marathon County	Wisconsin	Town
Hamburg, Vernon County	Wisconsin	Town
Hamburg State Park	Georgia	
Hamburg State Park	Georgia	
Hamtramck	Michigan	Named after John Hamtramck, a French-Canadian whose father's family originally came from Trier, Germany.
Hanover	Illinois	
Hanover	Pennsylvania	
Hanover	Virginia	
Hanover County	Virginia	Named for the Electorate of Hanover in Germany, because King George I of Great Britain was Elector of Hanover at the time.
Hanover Park	Illinois	
Hanover Township	New Jersey	Named for the Electorate of Hanover in Germany, because King George I of Great Britain was Elector of Hanover at the time.
Hanover Township	Pennsylvania	
Hartman	Colorado	Named after W. P. Hartman.
Hartsel	Colorado	Named after Samuel Hartsel.
Haubstadt	Indiana	
Hegewisch	Illinois	Named after Adolph Hegewisch.
Heidelberg	Kentucky	
Heidelberg	Minnesota	
Heidelberg	Mississippi	
Heidelberg	Pennsylvania	Named after Heidelberg on river Neckar, with its world famous castle
Heidelberg	Texas	
Heidlersburg	Pennsylvania	
Hellertown	Pennsylvania	Founded by Johann Heller, a Palatine settler.
Herkimer County	New York	Named after Nicholas Herkimer, a French and Indian War veteran and Revolutionary War patriot brigadier general from German Flatts, New York. Herkimer was a descendant of a German Palatine immigrant from Sandhausen named Georg Herchheimer.
Henning	Illinois	
Hermann	Missouri	Named after Arminius (German: Hermann), a Cherusci chieftain who defeated the Romans in the Battle of the Teutoburg Forest.
Herscher	Illinois	
Hettinger	North Dakota	
Hochheim	Texas	
Hochheim	Wisconsin	
Hohenwald	Tennessee	Means "high forest" in German.
Hoffman	Illinois	
Hoffman Estates	Illinois	
Hoehne	Colorado	Founded and named after William Hoehne, a German immigrant.
Holstein	Iowa	
Holstein	Nebraska	
Hosensack	Pennsylvania	
Hublersburg	Pennsylvania	Named after Jacob Hubler, the German-American founder of the community.
Humboldt	Illinois	
Humboldt Bay	California	Named after Alexander von Humboldt (1769–1859), German naturalist and explorer.
Humboldt County	California	Named after Alexander von Humboldt (1769–1859), German naturalist and explorer.
Humboldt County	Iowa	Named after Alexander von Humboldt (1769–1859), German naturalist and explorer.
Humboldt County	Nevada	Named after Alexander von Humboldt (1769–1859), German naturalist and explorer.
Humboldt Park	Illinois	A neighborhood in Chicago.
Hummelstown	Pennsylvania	Named after founders Frederick and Rosina Hummel, both immigrants from Germany.
Innisbrook	Florida	Named after Innsbruck.
Innsbrook	Missouri	Named after Innsbruck.
Innsbrook	Virginia	Named after Innsbruck.
Jena	Florida	Named after Town in Thuringia, Germany, 111.000 Inhabitants
Jena	Louisiana	Named for Jena, Germany after Napoleon won the Battle of Jena-Auerstedt.
Karlsruhe	North Dakota	Named after Karlsruhe, Germany.
Kaufman	Texas	
Kaufman	Illinois	
Kellner	Wisconsin	
Kepler	Kentucky	
Kiel	Wisconsin	Named after Kiel, Germany.
Kieler	Wisconsin	Named after John Kieler, a Prussian immigrant.
King of Prussia	Pennsylvania	Took its name in the 18th century from a local tavern named the King of Prussia Inn, named after King Frederick the Great of Prussia.
Kinzers	Pennsylvania	Named after Harry Kinzer, a German-American of Palatine descent.
Kleberg County	Texas	
Kleberg	Texas	
Kobuta	Pennsylvania	A combination of the name of Koppers, a chemical company, and butadiene. Koppers was founded by and named after Heinrich Koppers, an engineer from Germany.
Kolberg	Wisconsin	Named after Kolberg, Pomerania, now Kołobrzeg, Poland.
Koppel	Pennsylvania	Named after Arthur Koppel, co-founder Orenstein & Koppel, a German manufacturing company.
Kotzebue	Alaska	Named after Otto von Kotzebue.
Kountze	Texas	
Kranzburg	South Dakota	Named after the Kranz brothers, who were German settlers.
Kremmling	Colorado	Named after Rudolph Kremmling.
Kronenwetter	Wisconsin	Named after Sebastian Kronenwetter, an immigrant from Württemberg.
Krupp	Washington	The former name of Marlin, Washington.
Kulm	North Dakota	Named after various places called "Kulm" from which German immigrants originated.
Kutztown	Pennsylvania	Named after George Kutz.
Leinbachs	Pennsylvania	
Leipsic	Ohio	A variant spelling of Leipzig.
Lenhartsville	Pennsylvania	Founded by Heinrich Lenhart.
Lenzburg	Illinois	Named after Lenzburg.
Liebenthal	Kansas	Named after a Volga German settlement
Lititz	Pennsylvania	Named after Litice Castle (German: Schloss Lititz) near the formerly German-speaking town of Kunvald (German: Kunewalde, Kunwald), in the region of Bohemia in the Czech Republic.
Lower Heidelberg Township	Pennsylvania	
Lubeck	West Virginia	Named after Lübeck, Germany.
Luckenbach	Texas	
Lunenburg	Massachusetts	Named after one of the titles of King George II of Great Britain, Duke of Brunswick-Lüneburg.
Lunenburg	Vermont	Named after one of the titles of King George II of Great Britain, Duke of Brunswick-Lüneburg.
Lunenburg	Virginia	Named after one of the titles of King George II of Great Britain, Duke of Brunswick-Lüneburg.
Lunenburg County	Virginia	Named for the German Duchy of Brunswick-Lüneburg.
Luther	Michigan	Named after Martin Luther.
Lutherville	Maryland	Named after Martin Luther.
Lutsen	Minnesota	Named after Lützen, Germany.
Luxemburg	Wisconsin	
Luzerne	Iowa	Named after Luzern, Switzerland.
Lynden	Washington	Named after Hohenlinden, Germany.
Manheim	Pennsylvania	Named after Manheim, Germany.
Mayer	Minnesota	
Mecklenburg	New York	A hamlet in the town of Hector, New York.
Mecklenburg County	North Carolina	Named after the German state of Mecklenburg-Strelitz, or for Charlotte of Mecklenburg, queen consort of George III of Great Britain.
Mecklenburg County	Virginia	Named for Charlotte of Mecklenburg, queen consort of George III of Great Britain.
Meiners Oaks	California	Named after German Native John Meiners.
Millheim	Missouri	Corruption of "Müllheim," a common German place name that means "mill home." It's unknown whether the name is descriptive of settlement itself or taken from one of the numerous locations in Germany with the name.
Millheim	Pennsylvania	
Millstadt	Illinois	A misspelling of the original name: "Mittlestadt."
Minden	Louisiana	Named after Minden, Germany.
Minden	Nebraska	Named after Minden, Germany.
Minden	Nevada	Named after Minden, Germany.
Mohnton	Pennsylvania	Founded by the Mohn family.
Muhlenberg County	Kentucky	Named after Peter Muhlenberg.
Muhlenberg Township	Pennsylvania	Named after Henry Augustus Muhlenberg.
Mundelein	Illinois	
Munich	North Dakota	Named after Munich, Germany.
Munjor	Kansas	Named after a Volga German settlement.
Munster	Indiana	Named after Münster, North Rhine-Westphalia.
Nassau	New York	Town in Rensselaer County
Nassau County	Florida	Named for the Duchy of Nassau in Germany.
Nassau County	New York	Named for the Duchy of Nassau in Germany.
Nathrop	Colorado	Named after Charles Nachtrieb.
Newberg	Oregon	
Nechanitz	Texas	
New Baden	Illinois	Named after the region of Baden in Germany.
New Berlin	Illinois	
New Berlin	New York	Town
New Berlin	New York	Village
New Berlin	Pennsylvania	
New Berlin	Texas	
New Berlin	Wisconsin	Area residents put the accent on the first syllable of Berlin /nuːˈbɜːrlɪn/, rather than the second.
New Braunfels	Texas	Established in 1845 by Prince Carl of Solms-Braunfels, Commissioner General of the Adelsverein; Prince Solms named the settlement in honor of his home of Solms-Braunfels, Germany.
New Bremen	New York	
New Bremen	Ohio	
New Brunswick	New Jersey	Named after Brunswick, Germany
New Glatz	Maryland	Famed after the former German town Glatz annexed by Poland after 1945.
New Leipzig	North Dakota	Named after Leipzig, Germany.
New Melle	Missouri	Named after Melle, Germany.
New Munich	Minnesota	
New Offenburg	Missouri	
New Paltz	New York	Named after Palatinate by Huguenots who fled to here.
New Riegel	Ohio	
New Trier	Minnesota	
New Trier	Illinois	Named after Trier, Germany.
New Ulm	Minnesota	Named after Ulm, Germany.
New Wells	Missouri	Named after Wels, Austria. It was previously named Johannisberg, which is also of German-language origin although its exact namesake is unknown.
Nuremberg	Pennsylvania	
Ohlman	Illinois	Named after Michael Ohlman.
Oldenburg	Indiana	
Olmitz	Kansas	
Olpe	Kansas	Named after Olpe, Germany.
Oppenheim	New York	
Osnabrock	North Dakota	Named after Osnabruck in South Stormont, Ontario which gets it namesake from Osnabrück, Germany.
Otto Township	Illinois	
Orwigsburg	Pennsylvania	Named after its German founder, Peter Orwig.
Paderborn	Illinois	Named after Paderborn, Germany.
Paitzdorf	Missouri	The original name of Uniontown, Missouri. Named after Paitzdorf, Germany, it was changed to "Uniontown" when the settlement became a camp for Union soldiers during the American Civil War.
Palatine	New York	Named after the Palatinate region of Germany
Patzkau	Wisconsin	
Palatine	Illinois	
Peetz	Colorado	Named after Peter Peetz.
Pfeifer	Kansas	Named after a Volga German settlement.
Pflugerville	Texas	Named after German immigrant Henry Pfluger Sr.
Philipsburg	Montana	Named after Philip Deidesheimer, a German immigrant.
Pierz	Minnesota	Named after Francis Xavier Pierz (Pierz was the German version of his last name: Pirc).
Pilsen	Kansas	German name for Plzeň, Czech Republic.
Platner	Colorado	
Posen	Illinois	German name for Poznań, Poland.
Posen	Michigan	German name for Poznań, Poland.
Potsdam	Ohio	
Potsdam	New York	The town is named after the city of Potsdam in Germany.
Prussia	Iowa	
Pyrmont	Indiana	Named after the Principality of Waldeck and Pyrmont in Germany.
Pyrmont	Ohio	
Ratibor	Texas	German name of Racibórz, Poland.
Rebersburg	Pennsylvania	A history Pennsylvania Dutch community.
Rehrersburg	Pennsylvania	Named for the Rehrer family who settled there in 1803.
Reinholds	Pennsylvania	A common German male given name and surname.
Rhinebeck	New York	
Riegelsville	Pennsylvania	Founded by Benjamin Riegel.
Rohnert Park	California	
Rosenberg	Texas	Named after Swiss-German immigrant Henry Rosenberg.
Rostok	Wisconsin	Named after a town in formerly German-speaking Bohemia
Rothschild	Wisconsin	
Sachse	Texas	Named after William Sachse, an immigrant from Herford, Prussia.
Saegertown	Pennsylvania	Named after Daniel Saeger.
Salzburg	Pennsylvania	Former name of Emmaus, Pennsylvania.
Saxonburg	Pennsylvania	Founded by John A. Roebling, a German immigrant. Its name was originally "Sachsenburg" before being anglicized to "Saxonburg"
Schafer	North Dakota	
Schalls	Missouri	Named after Maritz Schall, a local pioneer.
Schaumburg	Illinois	Named after the area of Schaumburg in Germany.
Schellsburg	Pennsylvania	Names after John Schell, the grandson of Michael Schell, an immigrant from the Palatinate.
Schererville	Indiana	
Schertz	Texas	A family name of the city's original German settlers.
Schiller Park	Illinois	
Schleicher County	Texas	Named in honor of Gustav Schleicher, a veteran of the Confederate Army.
Schleswig	Iowa	
Schleswig	Wisconsin	
Schley County	Georgia	Named for William Schley, a United States representative and the thirty-sixth governor of Georgia who was of Palatine ancestry.
Schluersburg	Missouri	Named after a town in Germany.
Schoeneck	Pennsylvania	Corruption of Pennsylvania Dutch "Schoenes Eck" which meaning "pretty corner."
Schoenchen	Kansas	Named after a Volga German settlement.
Schriever	Louisiana	
Schroeder	Minnesota	
Schulenburg	Texas	
Schumer Springs	Missouri	Named after the proprietors of the local spring, Henry J. Schumer and Frank. P Schuemer.
Schurz	Nevada	Named after Carl Schurz, a German immigrant who became the United States Secretary of the Interior.
Schnecksville	Pennsylvania	
Schwenksville	Pennsylvania	
Seelitz	Missouri	Named after Seelitz, Germany.
Seibert	Colorado	Named after Henry Seibert.
Seltzer	Pennsylvania	Named after Conrad Seltzer, a German immigrant who started a meatpacking business there.
Selz	North Dakota	Named after the Selz River.
Sigel	Illinois	Named after Franz Sigel, a German general in the Union military.
Sigel, Chippewa County	Wisconsin	Named after Franz Sigel, a German general in the Union military.
Sigel, Wood County	Wisconsin	Named after Franz Sigel, a German general in the Union military.
Sigel Township	Illinois	Named after Franz Sigel, a German general in the Union military.
Sigel Township	Michigan	Named after Franz Sigel, a German general in the Union military.
Sigel Township	Minnesota	Named after Franz Sigel, a German general in the Union military.
Spitzenberg	Oregon	
Steger	Illinois	Named after John Valentine Steger, and immigrant from Ulm, Germany.
Steuben	Maine	
Steuben	New York	
Steuben	Wisconsin	
Steubenville	Indiana	
Steubenville	Ohio	
Steuben County	Indiana	
Steuben County	New York	Named for Baron Friedrich Wilhelm von Steuben, a German general who fought on the American side in the American Revolutionary War.
Steuben Township	Illinois	
Steuben Township	Indiana	
Steuben Township	Indiana	
Steuben Township	Pennsylvania	
Stettin	Wisconsin	
Stiritz	Illinois	
Stockertown	Pennsylvania	Named after the Stockers, a family of Swiss-German origin.
Strasburg	Colorado	
Strasburg	Illinois	
Strasburg	North Dakota	
Strasburg	Pennsylvania	
Strasburg	Virginia	
Stuttgart	Arkansas	
Stuttgart	Kansas	
St. Augusta	Minnesota	Named after Augustine of Hippo by Francis Xavier Pierz, an Austro-Slovene missionary who came up with the name after finding a German language holy card depicting Augustine in the field where the local parish church was being built. The original card is still preserved within the parish's archives.
St. Hedwig	Texas	
Suedberg	Pennsylvania	
Tilsit	Missouri	German name of Sovetsk, Russia.
Traunik	Michigan	German name of Travnik, Bosnia and Herzegovina.
Treutlen County	Georgia	Named after John A. Treutlen, the first elected Governor of Georgia who immigrated from Württemberg, Germany.
Trumbauersville	Pennsylvania	
Ulm	Arkansas	Named after Ulm, Germany.
Ulmer	South Carolina	
Vader	Washington	Named in 1913 for Martin Vader
Vienna	Illinois	
Vienna	Missouri	
Vienna	Virginia	
Vienna	West Virginia	
Von Ormy	Texas	
Wald	Alabama	German for "forest"
Waldeck	Kansas	ghost town
Waldeck	Pennsylvania	
Waldeck	Texas	Named after Count Ludwig Joseph von Boos-Waldeck.
Waldheim	Louisiana	Name meaning forest home.
Waldorf	Maryland	Named in honor of William Waldorf Astor, who received his middle name from the German town of Walldorf.
Waldport	Oregon	Compound of "Wald," the German word for "forest," and "port."
Walhalla	Michigan	German name of Valhalla.
Walhalla	North Dakota	German name of Valhalla.
Walhalla	South Carolina	German name of Valhalla.
Walhalla	Texas	German name of Valhalla.
Walhalla Township	Minnesota	German name of Valhalla.
Walsenburg	Colorado	Named after Fred Walsen, a German immigrant.
Wassergass	Pennsylvania	Name meaning "water lane" for nearby stream.
Wattenburg	Colorado	
Weimar	California	
Weimar	Texas	
Weingarten	Missouri	
Weisenberg Township	Pennsylvania	Named after Weißenberg.
Weiser	Idaho	Named after Peter M. Weiser, an American of German descent.
Weissport	Pennsylvania	Founded by Jacob Weiss, a Revolutionary War veteran of German descent.
Weitzer	Colorado	Former/alternate name of Vroman, Colorado.
Wendte	South Dakota	
Wernersville	Pennsylvania	
Wertenberg	Illinois	
Westhoff	Texas	
Westphalia	Indiana	
Westphalia	Iowa	
Westphalia	Kansas	
Westphalia	Maryland	
Westphalia	Michigan	Named after the region of Westphalia in Germany.
Westphalia	Missouri	
Westphalia	Texas	
Wickenburg	Arizona	Named after Henry Wickenburg, a Prussian prospector.
Wittenberg	Missouri	Named after Wittenberg, Germany.
Wittenberg	Wisconsin	Named after Wittenberg, Germany.
Womelsdorf	Pennsylvania	Part Village of Erndtebrück in District "Siegen-Wittgenstein", North Rhine-Westphalia.
Wrangell	Alaska	Named after Baltic German explorer Ferdinand von Wrangel.
Wurtemburg	Pennsylvania	Likely named after Württemberg, Germany.
Yeagertown	Pennsylvania	Anglicization of "Jäger" a common German word and surname meaning "hunter."
Yoder	Colorado	Named after Ira Yoder.
Zeigler	Illinois	
Zelienople	Pennsylvania	Named after the daughter of Dettmar Basse, a baron from Frankfurt am Main.
Zell	Missouri	
Zimmerman	Minnesota	

== See also ==
- Amana Colonies, Iowa
- Germantown, Maryland
- Germantown, New York
- Germantown, Tennessee
- Leavenworth, Washington
- List of U.S. state name etymologies
- Lists of U.S. county name etymologies
- List of place names of French origin in the United States
- List of U.S. place names of Spanish origin
- List of non-US places that have a US place named after them
