= Berlin (disambiguation) =

Berlin is the capital and largest city of Germany.

Berlin may also refer to:

== Places ==
=== Germany ===
- East Berlin, former de facto capital of the German Democratic Republic, 1949–90
- West Berlin, former western enclave of Berlin during the Cold War, 1949–90
- Berlin, district of Klein Bennebek, Schleswig-Holstein
- Berlin (Seedorf), district of Seedorf, Schleswig-Holstein

=== United States ===
- Berlin, Alabama, town
- Berlin, California, former name of Genevra, California, unincorporated community
- Berlin, Connecticut, town
- Berlin, Georgia, town
- Berlin, Illinois, village
- Berlin, Indiana, former town
- Berlin, Iowa, a former name of Lincoln, Iowa
- Berlin, Kansas, unincorporated community
- Berlin, Kentucky, unincorporated community
- Berlin, Maryland, town
- Berlin, Massachusetts, town
- Berlin, Michigan (disambiguation), multiple locations in Michigan
- Berlin, Missouri, unincorporated community
- Berlin, Nebraska, a former name of Otoe, Nebraska, village
- Berlin, Nevada, ghost town
- Berlin, New Hampshire, city
- Berlin, New Jersey, township
- Berlin, New York, town
- Berlin, North Dakota, city
- Berlin, Ohio (disambiguation), multiple locations in Ohio
- Berlin, Oklahoma, unincorporated community
  - Zincville, Oklahoma, town in Ottawa County, formally called Berlin
- Berlin, Pennsylvania, borough
- Berlin, Tennessee, unincorporated community
- Berlin, Texas, unincorporated community
- Berlin, Vermont, town
- Berlin, West Virginia, unincorporated community
- Berlin, Wisconsin (disambiguation), multiple municipalities in Wisconsin
- Berlin Historic District (disambiguation), multiple places with the name
- Berlin Township (disambiguation), multiple townships

=== Elsewhere ===
- Berlín, Usulután, El Salvador
- Berlin, former name of Kitchener, Ontario
- Berlin, Russia
- Berlin, South Africa
- Mount Berlin, a mountain in Marie Byrd Land, Antarctica

== People ==
- Berlin (surname)
- Alex Wright, professional wrestler (former stage name "Berlin")
- Berleezy (born 1992), screen name of American YouTuber Berlin Edmond
- Berlin Ndebe-Nlome (born 1987), Cameroonian football player
- Bertie "Berlin" Marshall, member of early UK punk fan faction the Bromley Contingent, later an author
- Berlin Painter (active c. 490s – c. 460s BC), conventional name given to an unidentified Attic Greek vase-painter

== Arts, entertainment, and media ==
=== Film and television ===
- Berlin: Symphony of a Metropolis, a 1927 German film
- Berlin (British TV series), a 2009 documentary series
- "Berlin" (The Blacklist), a 2014 TV episode
- Berlin (2023 film), an Indian Hindi-language spy thriller film
- Berlin (Spanish TV series), a 2023 prequel in the Money Heist franchise
- "Berlin" (NCIS), a 2013 episode of the TV series NCIS

=== Music ===
==== Groups ====
- Berlin (band), American new wave band
- James Freud and Berlin, Australian new wave band

==== Albums and EPs ====
- Berlin (Art Zoyd album), 1987
- Berlin (EP), 2013, by RY X
- Berlin (Kadavar album), 2015
- Berlin (Lou Reed album), 1973
- Berlin - A Concert for the People, a 1982 live album by Barclay James Harvest

==== Songs ====
- "Berlin", by Black Rebel Motorcycle Club from the 2007 album Baby 81
- "Berlin", by Udo Lindenberg, 1981
- "Berlin", by Fischer-Z from the 1981 album Red Skies over Paradise
- "Berlin", by Marillion from the 1989 album Seasons End
- "Berlin", by Nina Hagen from the 1993 album Revolution Ballroom
- "Berlin", by Janis Ian from the 1995 album Revenge
- "Berlin", by Amanda Palmer & the Grand Theft Orchestra from Theatre Is Evil
- "Berlin", by Lou Reed from the 1973 album Berlin
- "Berlin", by RY X from his EP Berlin
- "Berlin", by Snow Patrol from the 2011 album Fallen Empires
- "Berlin", by Tokio Hotel from the 2022 album 2001
- "Berlín", by Aitana
- "Berlin", by Brockhampton from the 2018 album iridescence

=== Other uses in arts, entertainment, and media ===
- Berlin (play), 2009, by David Hare
- Berlin (Money Heist), a character in the Money Heist franchise
- Berlin (comics), series of comic books by Jason Lutes depicting life in Berlin from 1928 to 1933
- Berlin (musical), written by Erik Orton
- Berlin (sculpture), a 1987 piece of art in west Berlin
- Berlin Defence, in chess

== Computing and technology ==
- .berlin, a top level domain
- FuG 224 Berlin A, airborne radar system of World War II
- FuG 240 Berlin, airborne radar system of late World War II

== Transportation ==
=== Air ===
- Berlin Airport (disambiguation), multiple airports with the name

=== Rail ===
- Berlin Station (disambiguation), multiple stations with the name
- Berlin, former name the Liège station of the Paris Metro, France
- Berlin, former LIRR station on the Atlantic Branch, Richmond Hill, Queens, New York
- Berlin, former name of Dunton station at Van Wyck Avenue, 1871–76
- Berlín, a Medellín Metro station
- Berlin Junction, former LIRR station on the Atlantic Branch, Richmond Hill, Queens, New York

=== Ships ===
- Berlin A1411, lead ship of the Berlin-class replenishment ships of the German Navy
- MS Berlin, an ocean liner built in 1924 as MS Gripsholm
- SMS Berlin, cruiser of the Imperial German Navy built in 1902
- SS Berlin, multiple ships with the name
- SS City of Berlin, a British passenger steamship of 1875
- Birlinn or Berlin, a type of Scottish longship

=== Other uses in transportation ===
- Berlin (carriage), a type of coach or chariot
- IWL SR 59 Berlin, an East German motor scooter

== Other uses ==
- Berliner (doughnut), a type of pastry
- Berlin Mills Company, a former company of Berlin, New Hampshire
- Berlin Raceway, a paved, oval track in Marne, Michigan
- Berlin wool work, a type of embroidery on canvas
- Hertha BSC, football team

== See also ==
- Berliner (disambiguation)
- New Berlin (disambiguation)
- Berlin-Brandenburg (disambiguation)
- East Berlin (disambiguation)
- West Berlin (disambiguation)
- District of Berlin (disambiguation)
- List of songs about Berlin
- Berolina, personification of the city of Berlin
- Berlino, mascot for the 2009 World Championships in athletics
- Belen (disambiguation)
- Berdin (disambiguation)
