= Berlin Township, Michigan =

Berlin Township is the name of the following places in the U.S. state of Michigan:

- Berlin Township, Ionia County, Michigan
- Berlin Township, St. Clair County, Michigan
- Berlin Charter Township, Michigan, Monroe County

== See also ==
- Berlin Township (disambiguation)
- Berlin, Michigan (disambiguation)
