= Brammibal's Donuts =

Vegan donut chain in Berlin and Hamburg

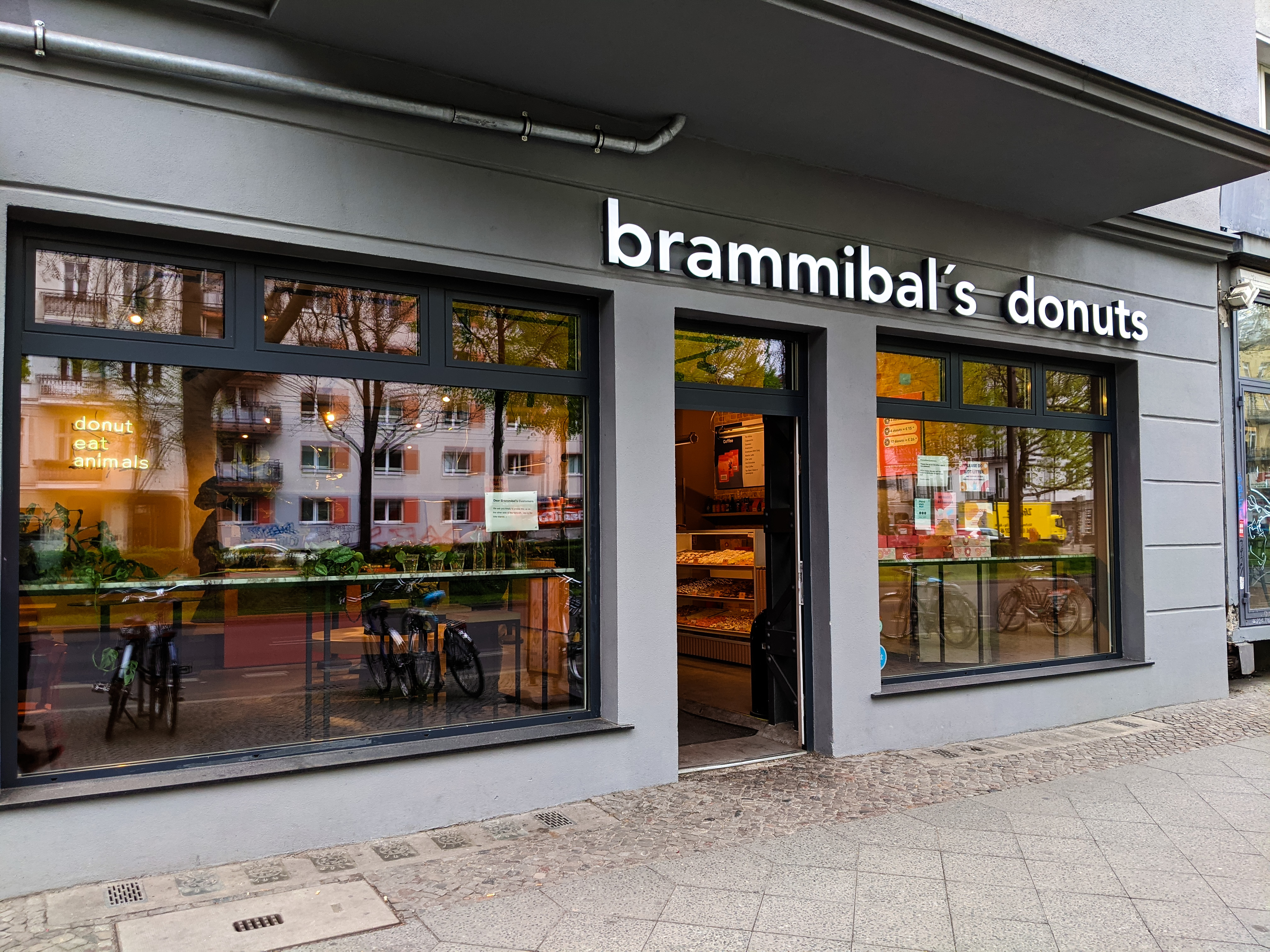
- One of the chain's donut shops
- Formation: 2015
- VAT ID no.: HRB 199030 B
- Legal status: GmbH
- Website: brammibalsdonuts.com

Brammibal's Donuts is a chain of thirteen vegan cafés selling donuts in Berlin and Hamburg, Germany. It is the first such chain in Europe.

== Product range ==
Brammibal's offer eight donut "classics" and a number of changing "specials". The chain's palette also includes one charity donut, with part of the proceeds going to a different charity every month. The donut shops also serve coffee drinks, and are popular with Instagram users.

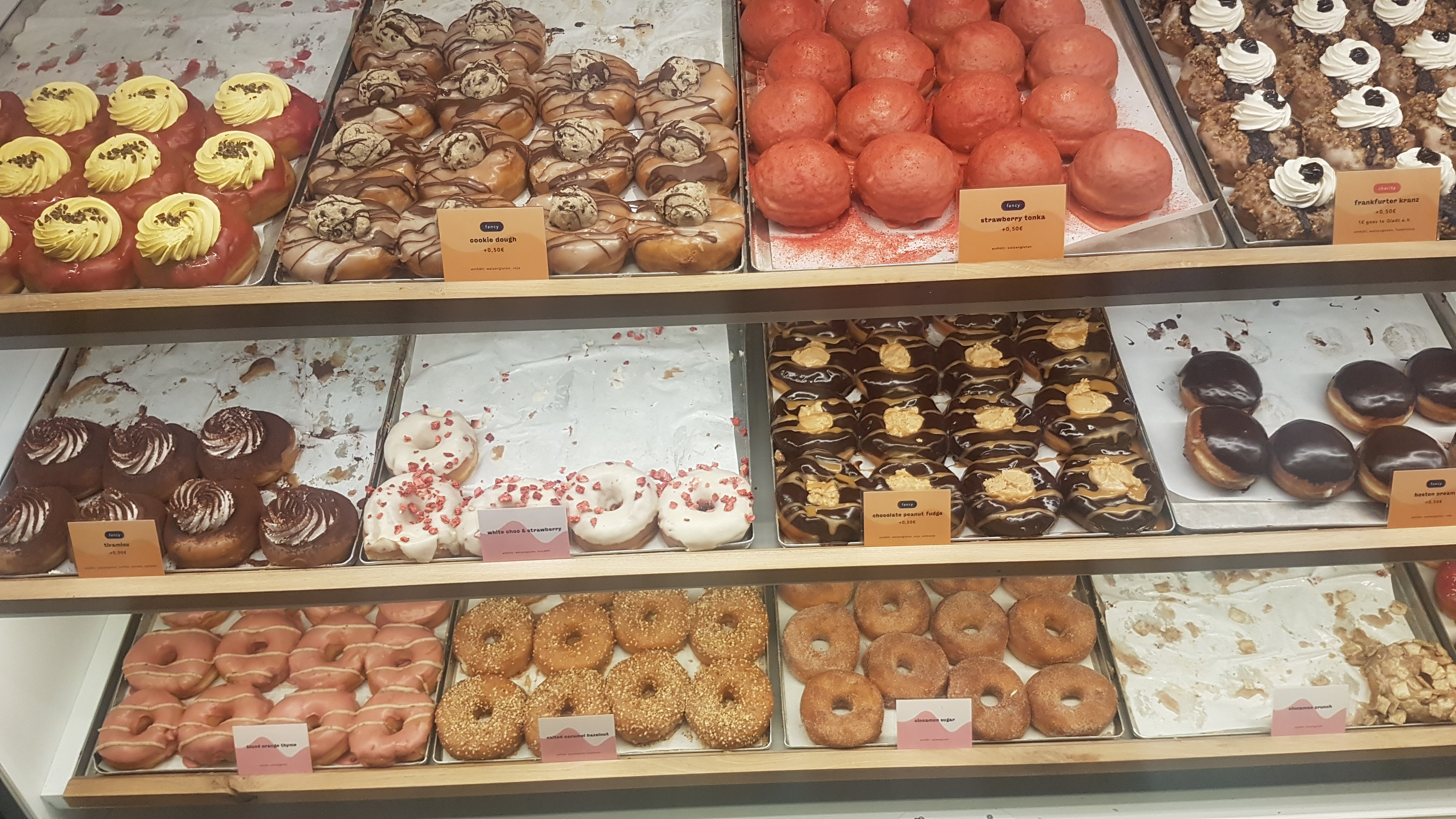
Donuts on display in 2020

== History ==
Brammibal's was founded in 2015 by the couple Jessica Jeworutzki and Bram van Montfort. They initially sold donuts at markets and events until they opened their first donut shop in 2016. They have financed their expansion through crowdfunding, an ecological bank, and a loan from van Montfort's father. One crowdfunding campaign in 2015 failed to raise the funds required to open a shop. Van Montfort is a former band musician while Jeworutzki used to work as a hospital nurse.

== Reception ==
In 2016, Exberliner called Brammibal's Donuts "Berlin's vegan sensation of the year". In 2021, Tina Hütterl of the Berliner Zeitung gave the donuts of Brammibal's an excellent review, describing them as "the best of my life", indistinguishable from non-vegan donuts, and tasting "as good as they look".

In 2022, Manuel Almeida Vergara of the Berliner Zeitung felt that that the taste of Brammibal's donuts was inferior to those sold by Dunkin' Donuts.
