= Berliner Abendblatt =

German weekly advertising paper

- Type: Weekly newspaper
- Founded: October 2, 1991
- City: Berlin, Germany
- Website: berliner-abendblatt.de

The Berliner Abendblatt is the leading weekly advertising paper in Berlin, Germany alongside the Berliner Woche and, along with Einkaufaktuell, one of the three main media for the collective distribution of the weekly brochures of retail chains in Berlin.

The circulation of 1.45 million copies is distributed in 23 local editions within Berlin. The distribution takes place every weekend to numerous Berlin households in the "economically attractive core areas"."

The Berliner Abendblatt belongs to the Berliner Verlag, which also published the Berliner Zeitung in former times, and its editorial line shows a coloration that is close to the Left or currently close to the politics of the Berlin Senate.

== Content ==
The primary task of the paper, as is usual with advertising newspapers, is the transport of numerous inserted advertising brochures and advertisements. In between, short editorial and strongly illustrated articles on city events are published with a focus on the area of the local edition and the Berlin Senate activities, event notes, advertorials and entertainment articles (with material of dpa), especially for the older generation. The volume usually consists of 8 or 10 pages in newspaper format.

Exemplary content based on the Berlin-Pankow issue of October 2, 2020, with a focus on "30 years of reunification":

- 10 pages newspaper (approx. 40 g), of which estimated
  - 3 pages of editorial contributions and photos on German reunification, of which approx. 1 1/2 pages of texts by Gregor Gysi and others
  - 1 1/4 pages advertorials/entertainment (medicine/travel)
  - 1/2 Pages classifieds
  - 2 1/4 pages advertising
  - 3 pages of full page advertising
- 8 enclosed brochures from retailers (approx. 300 g)

== History ==
The Berliner Abendblatt first appeared on October 2, 1991, initially only in the then East Berlin districts of Pankow/Weißensee, Mitte/Friedrichshain, Treptow/Köpenick, and Marzahn/Hellersdorf. The Prenzlauer Berg and Lichtenberg/Hohenschönhausen issues followed in the same month. In 1996, the Berliner Abendblatt began to publish issues for Reinickendorf, Neukölln, Tempelhof, Spandau and Steglitz/Zehlendorf in the former western part of the city. Between 1996 and 2001, additional local editions were added continuously. Currently, there are 23 editions, which roughly correspond to the 23 Berlin districts before the administrative reform in 2001.

=== First editions in the Berlin districts ===
Date	District (Bezirk)
2 October 1991	Pankow/Weißensee, Mitte/Friedrichshain, Treptow/Köpenick, Marzahn/Hellersdorf
30 October 1991	Prenzlauer Berg, Lichtenberg/Hohenschönhausen
17 July 1996	Reinickendorf, Neukölln, Tempelhof
24 July 1996	Spandau
31 July 1996	Steglitz/Zehlendorf
4 November 1998	Schöneberg
6 January 1999	Tiergarten
29 September 1999	Charlottenburg
21 November 2001	Kreuzberg
5 January 2005	Wilmersdorf

== Publisher ==
BVZ Anzeigenzeitungen GmbH is a subsidiary of the Berliner Verlag. On the eventful history and the owners of the former SED publishing house since its sale by the PDS in 1990, see History of the Berliner Verlag.

In September 2019, the Berlin publishing house was surprisingly sold by the Cologne media group M. DuMont Schauberg to the married couple Silke and Holger Friedrich. This was followed by heated and controversial discussions, later also due to the unmasking of Holger Friedrich as unofficial collaborator "Peter Bernstein" of the Stasi by the Welt am Sonntag in November 2019.

Since then, Holger Friedrich has also been managing director of BVZ Anzeigenzeitungen GmbH.

== Location ==
As a subsidiary of the Berlin Verlag, BVZ Anzeigenzeitungen GmbH had its headquarters in the Berlin Verlag house in the Karl-Liebknecht-Straße near Alexanderplatz. In April 2017, the company moved to the Feratti building newly constructed by the Berlin Verlag at Alte Jakobstraße 105 in Berlin-Kreuzberg, the new headquarters of the Berlin Verlag in the historic Zeitungsviertel between Spittelmarkt and Axel-Springer-Hochhaus.
