= East Berlin (disambiguation) =

East Berlin was the name given to the eastern part of Berlin between 1949 and 1990, when it was the de facto capital of East Germany. It may also refer to:

- East Berlin, Connecticut
- East Berlin, Pennsylvania
- East Berlin, Nova Scotia
- East Berlin Formation, a Mesozoic, fossil-bearing geologic formation in Connecticut

== See also ==
- East of Berlin
- West Berlin (disambiguation)
- Berlin (disambiguation)
- Berliner (disambiguation)
- New Berlin (disambiguation)
- Berlin Township (disambiguation)
