= West Berlin (disambiguation) =

West Berlin was the name given to the western part of Berlin between 1949 and 1990. It may also refer to:

- West Berlin, New Jersey, an unincorporated area in New Jersey (United States)
- West Berlin, Nova Scotia, a community in Nova Scotia (Canada)

== See also ==
- East Berlin (disambiguation)
- Berlin (disambiguation)
- Berliner (disambiguation)
- New Berlin (disambiguation)
- Berlin Township (disambiguation)
