= Genevra =

Genevra may refer to:

== Places ==
- Geneva, Genevra in the Romansh language
- Genevra, California

== People ==
- Genevra Richardson (born 1948), British legal scholar
- Genevra Stone (born 1985), American rower

== See also ==
- "Sonnet – to Genevra", a sonnet by Lord Byron
