= New Berlin =

New Berlin is the name of several locations in the United States:

- New Berlin, Illinois, a village in Sangamon County
- New Berlin (town), New York
- New Berlin (village), New York
- New Berlin, Pennsylvania
- New Berlin, Texas
- New Berlin, Wisconsin
- New Berlin Township, Sangamon County, Illinois
- New Berlin, original name of North Canton, Ohio

== Entertainment ==
- New Berlin, a 2023 film by Aleksey Fedorchenko

== See also ==
- Berlin, capital of Germany
- Berlin (disambiguation)
- Berliner (disambiguation)
- East Berlin (disambiguation)
- West Berlin (disambiguation)
- Berlin Township (disambiguation)
- Nuevo Berlín, Uruguay
