= Femme Osage Creek =

Stream in the American state of Missouri

Location
- Country: United States
- State: Missouri
- Region: St. Charles County, Missouri

Physical characteristics
- Source
  - coordinates: 38°36′52″N 90°54′55″W
  - elevation: 860 ft (260 m)
- Mouth
  - coordinates: 38°39′43″N 90°43′53″W
  - elevation: 449 ft (137 m)

Basin features
- Tributaries
  - left: Callaway Fork

Femme Osage Creek is a stream in St. Charles County in the U.S. state of Missouri. It is a tributary of the Missouri River.

The stream headwaters arise just west of Missouri Route T and the stream flows initially west then turns north past the Femme Osage community on route T then turns to the east. The stream flows parallel to Missouri Route F past the Daniel Boone Home north of Schluersburg. It flows under Missouri Route 94 north of Defiance and enters the Missouri just south of the community of Hamburg within the Weldon Springs Conservation Area.

Femme Osage is a name derived from French meaning "Osage woman". It is unclear why the name Femme Osage was applied to this stream. Many variant names have been recorded, including "Faim of the Hoozaw River", "Femme Osage River", "Osage Womans River", and "Wife of Osage River".

== See also ==
- List of rivers of Missouri
