= Berlin Historic District =

Berlin Historic District may refer to:

- Berlin Historic District (Berlin, Nevada), listed on the National Register of Historic Places (NRHP)
- Berlin Historic District (Berlin, New Jersey), NRHP-listed in Camden County
- New Berlin Historic District, New Berlin, New York, NRHP-listed
- East Berlin Historic District, East Berlin, Pennsylvania, NRHP-listed
- Berlin Historic District (Berlin, Tennessee), NRHP-listed in Marshall County

== See also ==
- Berlin (disambiguation)
