= Berdin (disambiguation) =

Berdin is a rural type settlement in western Russia.

Berdin may also refer to:

== People ==
- Janine Berdin (born 2002), Filipina singer-songwriter and actress
- Mikhail Berdin (born 1998), Russian professional ice hockey goaltender

== Places ==
- Berdín Palace, a palace located in Spain

== See also ==
- Berlin (disambiguation)
