= Callaway Fork =

Stream in the American state of Missouri

Coordinates: 38.6386637°N 90.806521°W

Callaway Fork is a stream in the U.S. state of Missouri. It is a tributary of Femme Osage Creek.

Callaway Fork has the name of Flanders Callaway, a pioneer settler.

== See also ==
- List of rivers of Missouri
