= Berlin Township, Ohio =

Berlin Township, Ohio may refer to:

- Berlin Township, Erie County, Ohio
- Berlin Township, Delaware County, Ohio
- Berlin Township, Holmes County, Ohio
- Berlin Township, Knox County, Ohio
- Berlin Township, Mahoning County, Ohio

== See also ==
- Berlin, Ohio (disambiguation)
