= Berlin Station =

Berlin Station may refer to:

- Berlin Station (TV series), a 2016 American television series
- Berlin Operating Base, or Berlin Station, a CIA station in Berlin during the Cold War
- Berlin station (Connecticut), an Amtrak and Hartford Line station in Kensington, Connecticut
- Liège station (Paris Metro), a Paris Metro station originally named 'Berlin'
- Railway stations in Berlin, Germany
- Long-a-Coming Depot, a disused station in Berlin, New Jersey
- Berlin station (New Hampshire), a former Canadian National Railway station in Berlin, New Hampshire

== See also ==
- Berlin (disambiguation)
