= Cappeln, Missouri =

Unincorporated community in Missouri, U.S.

Coordinates: 38°41′03″N 90°56′20″W

Cappeln is an unincorporated community in St. Charles County, in the U.S. state of Missouri.

== History ==
A post office called Cappeln was established in 1870, and remained in operation until 1907. The community takes its name from Cappeln, in Germany.
