= Femme Osage, Missouri =

Unincorporated community in Missouri, U.S.

Coordinates: 38°38′12″N 90°56′31″W

Femme Osage is an unincorporated community in southwest St. Charles County, in the U.S. state of Missouri. The community is on Missouri Route T along the bank of the Femme Osage Creek.

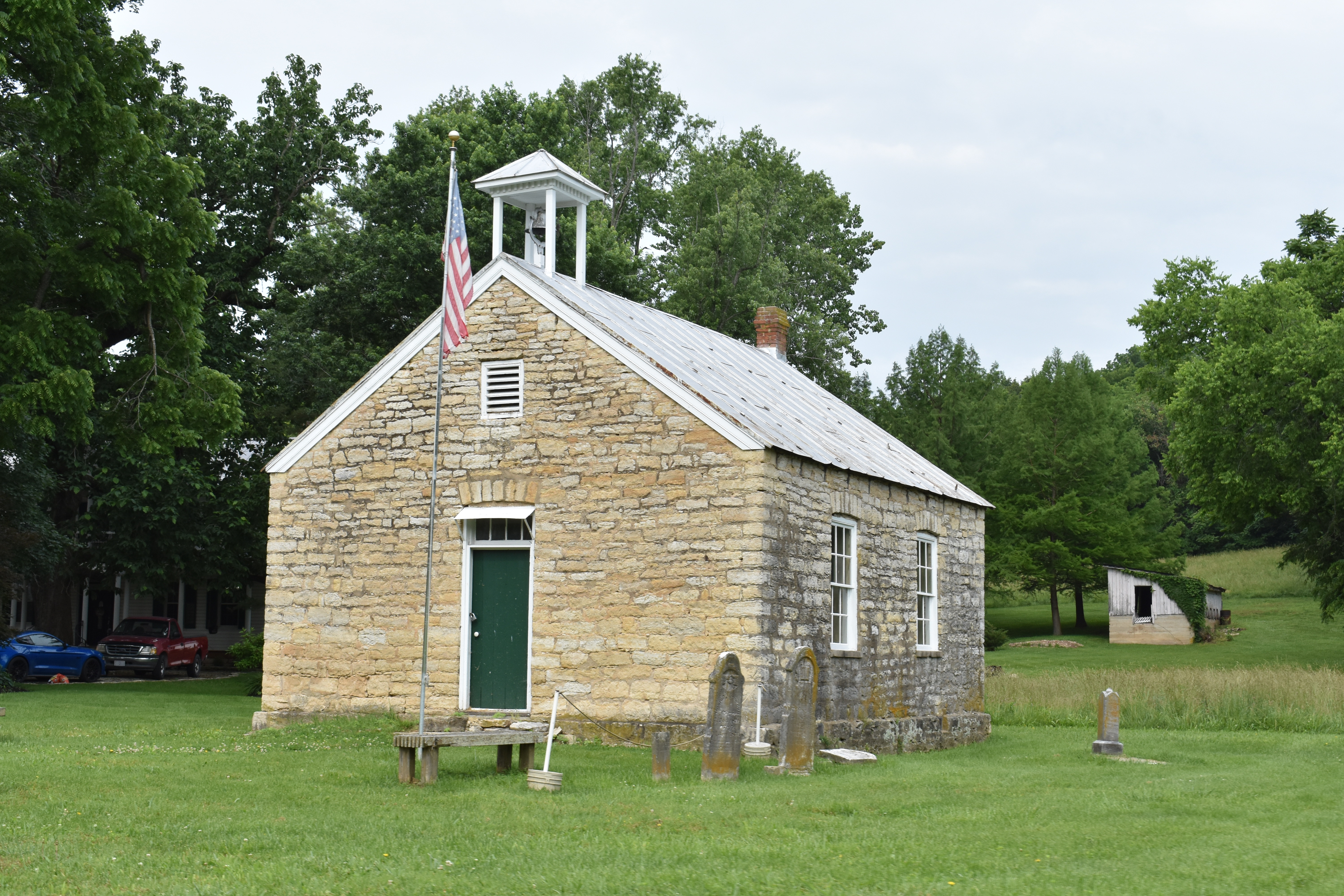
Old Femme Osage Schoolhouse

== History ==
A post office Femme Osage was in operation from 1816 until 1933. The community takes its name from nearby Femme Osage Creek.
