= Berliner Lake =

Lake in the state of Minnesota, United States

- Location within Minnesota
- Location: Carver County, Minnesota
- Coordinates: 44°51′46″N 93°53′56″W
- Type: lake

Berliner Lake is a lake in Carver County, Minnesota, United States.

Berliner Lake was named after Berlin, the former home of an early German settler.
