= Graefenburg, Pennsylvania =

Unincorporated community in Pennsylvania, U.S.

Coordinates: 39°54′06″N 77°27′43″W

Graefenburg is an unincorporated community in Adams County, Pennsylvania, United States. Graefenburg is located on U.S. Route 30 on the westernmost side of the county and in the Michaux State Forest. (11 miles east of Chambersburg)
