= Berlin, Ohio =

Berlin, Ohio may refer to:

- Berlin, Holmes County, Ohio
- Berlin, Williams County, Ohio
- Berlin Center, Ohio
- Berlin Crossroads, Ohio
- Berlin Heights, Ohio

== See also ==
- Berlin Township, Ohio (disambiguation)
