= Wassergass, Pennsylvania =

Unincorporated community in Pennsylvania, U.S.

Coordinates: 40°35′09″N 75°17′29″W

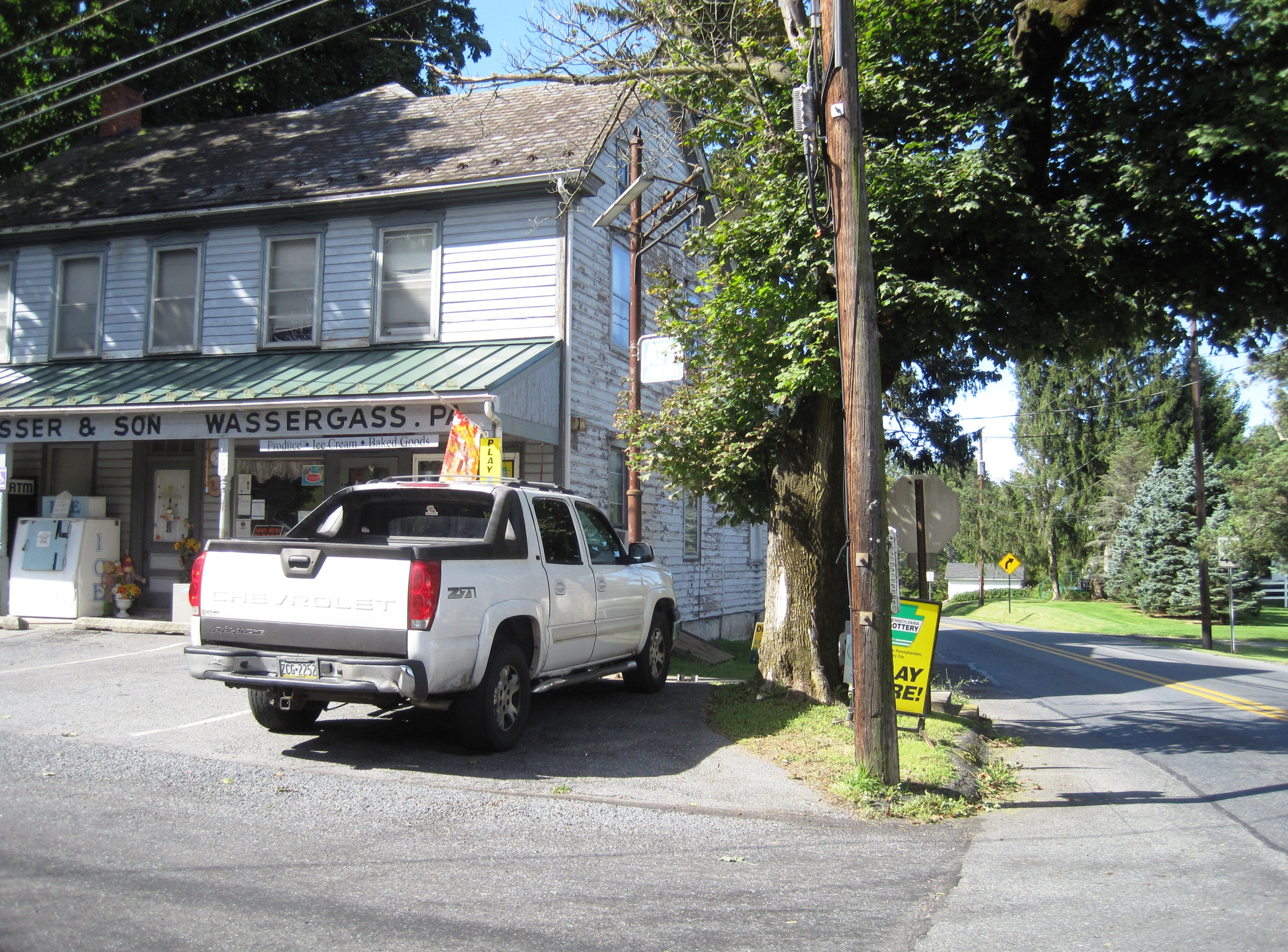
A. L. Bergstresser & Son General Store in Wassergass

Wassergass is an unincorporated community in Northampton County, Pennsylvania. Wassergass is part of the Lehigh Valley metropolitan area, which had a population of 861,899 and was the 68th-most populous metropolitan area in the U.S. as of the 2020 census.

== History ==
The village was originally known as Ironville, which was changed to avoid confusion with Iron Hill, a former village on Hellertown Road outside Bethlehem. The name Wassergass, in use since the 1890s, is German for "water lane", which originated because of a nearby stream. A post office was established in 1892 but remained in operation for only 12 years.
