= Berlin, Wisconsin (disambiguation) =

Berlin, Wisconsin is a city in Green Lake County, Wisconsin.

Berlin, Wisconsin may refer to places in the U.S. state of Wisconsin:

- Berlin (town), Green Lake County, Wisconsin, a town
- Berlin, Marathon County, Wisconsin, a town

== See also ==
- New Berlin, Wisconsin, a city
