= Einkaufaktuell =

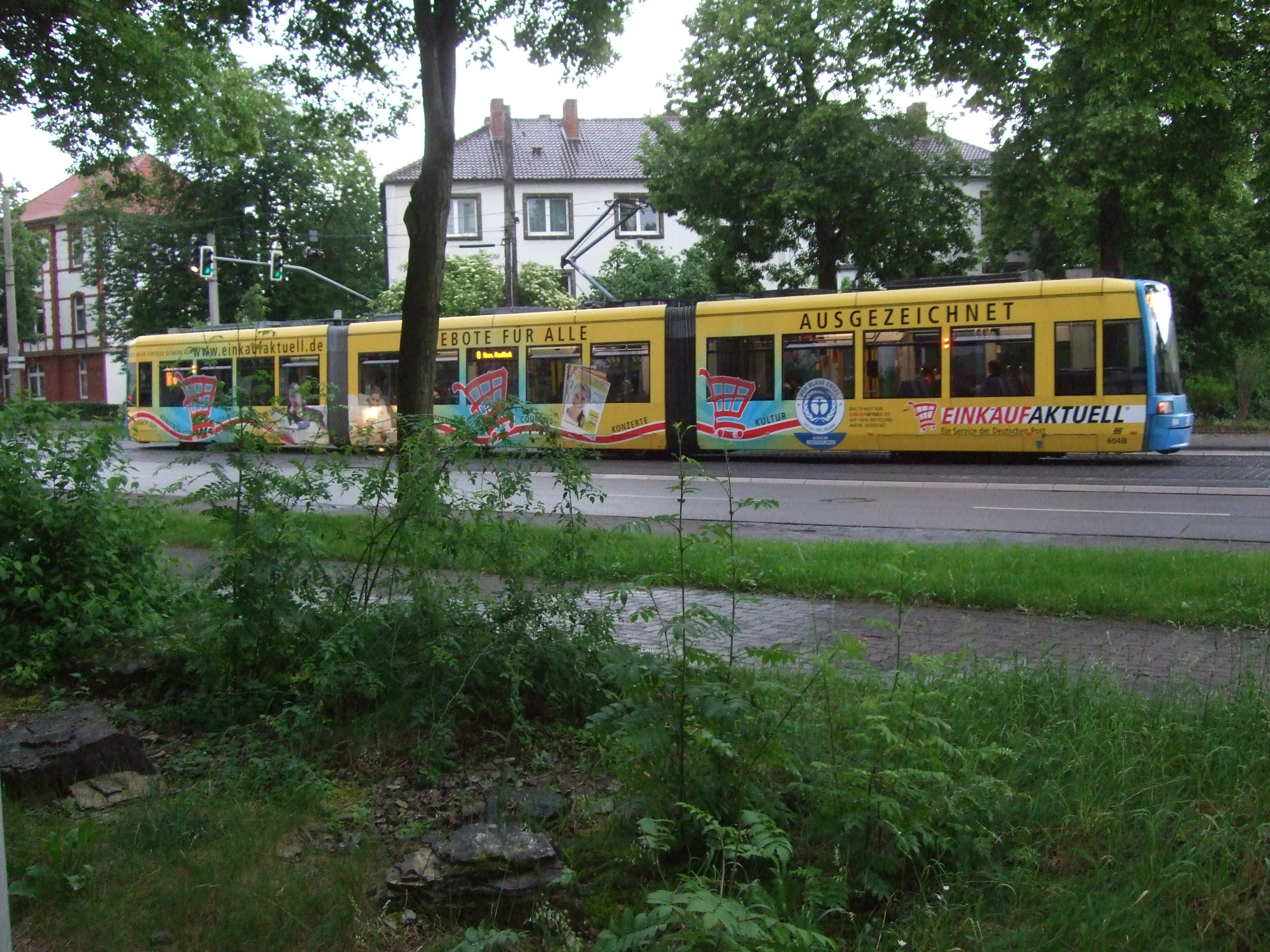
Tram in front of Kassel-Wilhelmshöhe station with advertising for EINKAUFAKTUELL

Einkaufaktuell (branded as EINKAUFAKTUELL) was a German unaddressed direct mail advertising service operated by Deutsche Post. The advertising mail was distributed weekly in certain delivery areas in Germany to all households that were not advertising objectors.

Delivery was usually done on Saturdays, exceptionally also on Fridays. The carrier medium for the advertising product was a TV program guide containing the current TV program for the following week, for selected TV stations that were mainly financed by advertising. Furthermore, the circular contained regional and national insert and advertisement advertising. The unaddressed mail had been distributed since autumn 2002. Distribution of the advertising mailing was discontinued on April 1, 2024.

== Circulation and distribution area ==
The carrier medium is currently printed in a run of around 20 million copies by various print shops, including the Svoboda Press print shop in Prague. Einkaufaktuell is currently (as of August 2010) distributed in 27 different editions in larger cities or metropolitan areas. The distribution takes place in a Polyethylene wrapping. Due to the bundling with advertising brochures, Einkaufaktuell is considered an advertising mail and may not be placed in mailboxes marked "no advertising" ("keine Werbung").

== Environmental impact ==
The Polyethylene packaging weighs 2.3 grams per issue (trial measurement 04/2008); this means that with a print run of 17.6 million pieces, the foil wrapping accounts for a total packaging weight of 40.4 tons per issue. The paper used for each issue (individual weight 3.3 grams) of over 58 tons does not yet include the regionally enclosed advertising supplements. Due to the fact that many households do not separate their advertising mailings into paper and outer packaging, the environmental impact is much higher. The issues of the carrier medium published since March 1, 2008 bear the "Blue Angel" eco-label, as they are made of 100% waste paper.
