= Berliner Straße =

Berliner Straße or Berliner Strasse is the name of several streets:

== Berlin ==
- Berliner Straße (Berlin-Blankenfelde)
- Berliner Straße (Berlin-Französisch Buchholz)
- Berliner Straße (Berlin-Heinersdorf)
- Berliner Straße (Berlin-Hellersdorf)
- Berliner Straße (Berlin-Hermsdorf)
- Berliner Straße (Berlin-Pankow)
- Berliner Straße (Berlin-Spandau)
- Berliner Straße (Berlin-Tegel)
- Berliner Straße (Berlin-Wilmersdorf) with the underground station Berliner Straße
- Berliner Straße in Berlin-Zehlendorf, part of Berlin-Potsdamer Chaussee

=== Former name ===
- Adlergestell in Schmöckwitz/Grünau
- Wernsdorfer Straße in Schmöckwitz/Grünau
- Alt-Friedrichsfelde (Straße) in Friedrichsfelde/Lichtenberg
- Brunsbütteler Damm in Staaken
- Fürstenwalder Damm in Friedrichshagen
- Hauptstraße (Berlin-Lichtenberg) in Lichtenberg
- Karl-Marx-Straße (Berlin) in Neukölln
- Richardstraße (Berlin) in Neukölln
- Konrad-Wolf-Straße in Alt-Hohenschönhausen
- Lehderstraße in Weißensee
- Marienfelder Allee in Marienfelde
- Ostpreußendamm in Lankwitz/Lichterfelde/Steglitz
- Schnellerstraße in Niederschöneweide/Adlershof/Köpenick
- Oberspreestraße in Niederschöneweide/Adlershof/Köpenick
- Straße des 17. Juni in Charlottenburg
- Otto-Suhr-Allee in Charlottenburg

== Other cities ==
- Berliner Straße (Bad Freienwalde)
- Berliner Straße (Cottbus)
- Berliner Straße (Frankfurt am Main)
- Berliner Straße (Mainz)
- Berliner Straße (Offenbach am Main)
- Berliner Straße (Wuppertal)
- Historical name of Świętej Trójcy street and Grunwaldzka street in Bromberg (now Bydgoszcz, Poland)

== Other uses ==
- Urbana Gerila, a former Yugoslav punk rock and new wave band from Belgrade
- Berliner Straße (film set), a film set in the Babelsberg Film Studios
