= Berliner (train) =

The Berliner was the name given to the City Night Line service between Zürich and Berlin Ostbahnhof. It has been succeeded by the "Sirius" service from Ostseebad Binz to Zürich via Berlin.

Here are the stations the Berliner served:

Outward journey	Return journey
Zürich HB	Berlin Ostbahnhof
Baden	Berlin Zoo
Basel SBB	Berlin-Spandau
Basel Bad Bf	Wolfsburg
Freiburg Hbf	Hannover Hbf
Offenburg	Frankfurt (Main) Süd
Karlsruhe Hbf	Mannheim Hbf
Mannheim Hbf	Karlsruhe Hbf
Frankfurt (Main) Süd	Offenburg
Hannover Hbf	Freiburg (Brg) Hbf
Wolfsburg Hbf	Basel Bad Bf
Berlin-Spandau	Basel SBB
Berlin Zoo	Baden
Berlin Ostbahnhof	Zürich HB
