= Berliner Kurier =

Tabloid newspaper in Berlin, Germany

- Type: Daily newspaper
- Owner: Holger Friedrich
- Publisher: Berliner Verlag GmbH
- Editor-in-chief: Hans-Peter Buschheuer
- Founded: 15 June 1949
- Language: German
- Headquarters: Berlin
- Circulation: 120,353 (Q1,2010)
- Website: berliner-kurier.de

The Berliner Kurier is a regional, daily tabloid published by the Berliner Verlag GmbH for the Berlin metropolitan area in Germany. The paper was owned by M. DuMont Schauberg. and got sold in September 2019 to Holger Friedrichs.

== History ==
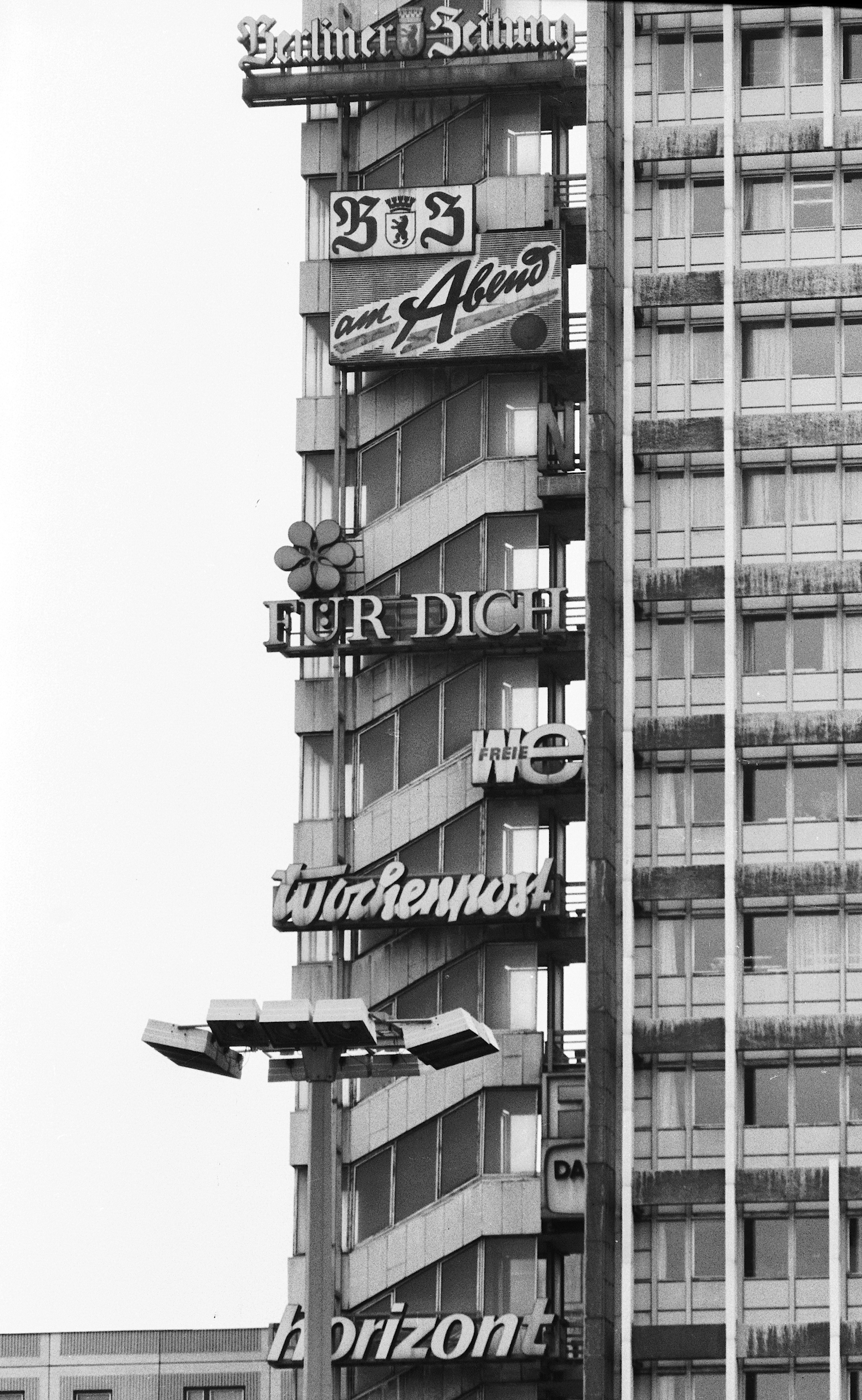
Berliner Verlag building in 1984. The state publishing house edited Berliner Zeitung, BZ am Abend, Für Dich, Freie Welt, Wochenpost, and Horizont.

The first issue of Berliner Kurier was published on July 15, 1949, under the name BZ am Abend (BZ at evening) by Berliner Verlag GmbH. In 1953, BZ am Abend get under the control of the Central Committee of the SED (Socialistic Unity Party), while Berliner Verlag continued to act as publisher. For a long time, it was the only evening and street-selling newspaper in the German Democratic Republic. Until the end of the GDR in 1990, it had a daily circulation of around 200,000 copies.

In January 2015, following the Charlie Hebdo shooting in which the staff of a French satirical magazine were attacked after previously drawing the Islamic prophet Muhammad, the front page of the Berliner Kurier was a cartoon of Muhammad reading Charlie Hebdo in a bath of blood.

During the first quarter of 2010 Berliner Kurier had a circulation of 120,353 copies.
