= SS Berlin =

SS Berlin may refer to one of the following ships

- SS Berlin (1867), a German passenger liner built by Caird & Company and operated by Norddeutscher Lloyd for service between Bremen and Baltimore
- SS Berlin (1891), a British cargo ship operated by the Yorkshire Coal and Shipping company, scrapped as River Ribble, 1933
- SS Berlin (1894), a British passenger liner operated by the Great Eastern Railway company, sank 1907
- SS Berlin (1896), a Danish cargo ship
- SS Berlin (1908), a German passenger liner which saw service as an auxiliary cruiser during World War I, scrapped as SS Arabic, 1931
- SS Berlin (1925), a German passenger liner and World War II hospital ship

== See also ==
- MS Berlin (1924), a German passenger liner, built as the Swedish Gripsholm
