= Berliner Zeitung =

German daily newspaper

- Sample front page
- Type: Daily newspaper (except Sundays)
- Format: Rhenish
- Owner: Holger Friedrich
- Publisher: Berliner Verlag
- Editor-in-chief: Moritz Eichhorn
- Founded: 21 May 1945; 81 years ago
- Language: German
- Headquarters: Berlin, Germany
- Circulation: 148,000 (2010)
- ISSN: 0947-174X
- Website: www.berliner-zeitung.de

The Berliner Zeitung (German: [bɛʁˈliːnɐ ˈtsaɪtʊŋ]; lit. 'Berlin Newspaper') is a daily newspaper based in Berlin, Germany. Founded in East Germany in 1945, it is the only East German paper to achieve national prominence since German reunification. It is published by Berliner Verlag. In Eastgermany, the Berliner Zeitung was the leading daily newspaper in East Berlin and an integral part of the SED’s press monopoly.

Media entrepreneur Holger Friedrich bought Berliner Verlag and Berliner Zeitung in 2019. Since then, the journalistic principle of separating the publishing and editorial sides has been widley abandoned. Friedrich implemented a shift in editorial direction of Berliner Zeitung that is described as pro-Russian and friendly toward the AfD.

== History and profile ==
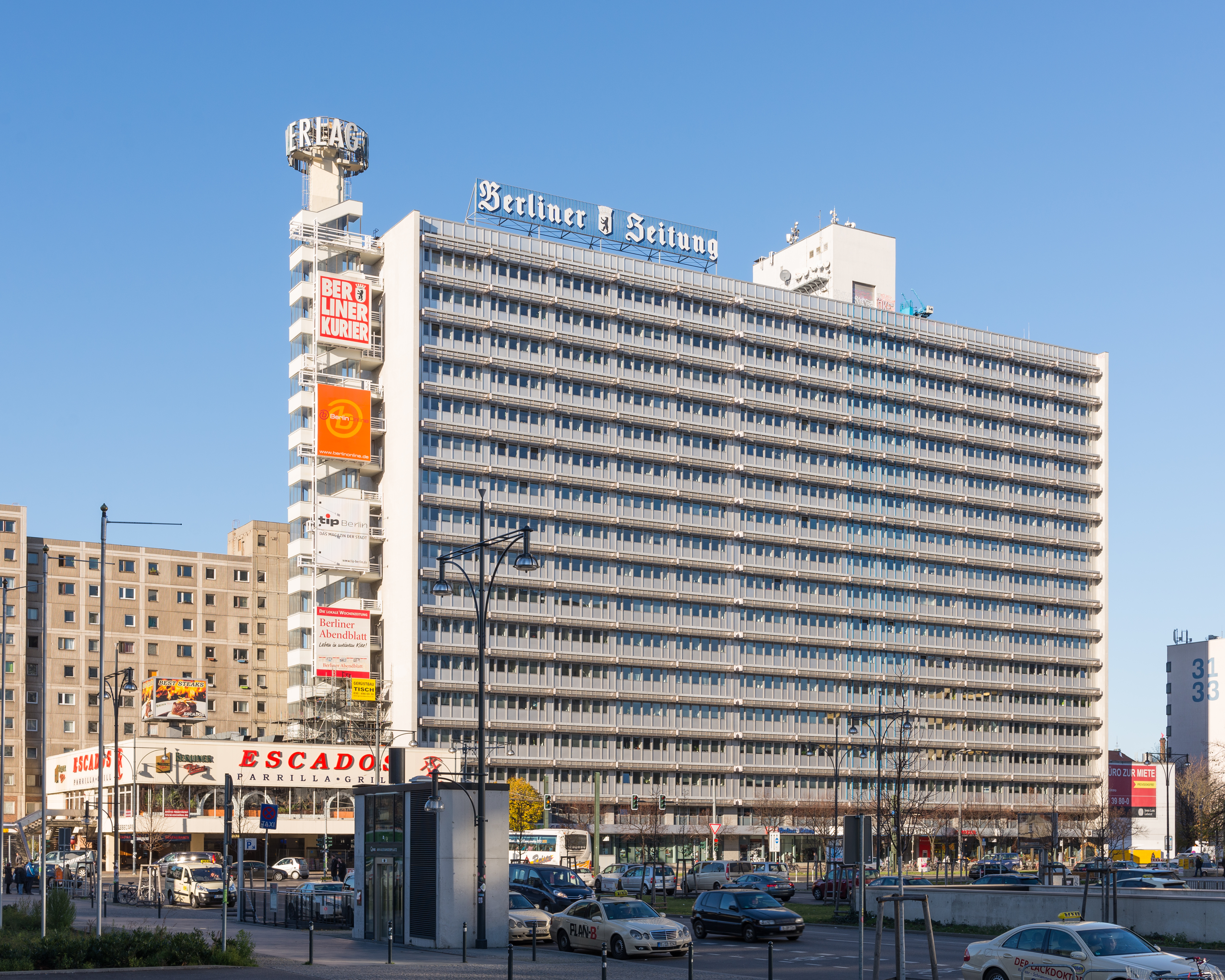
Berliner Zeitung headquarters

=== Beginnings ===
Berliner Zeitung was first published on 21 May 1945 in East Berlin as one of the first newspapers after World War II. The paper, a center-left daily, is published by Berliner Verlag. Initially, the newspaper served as the mouthpiece of the provisional Berlin city administration. After the founding of the SED, it became its organ, subject to close censorship.

=== German reunification ===
After the fall of the Berlin Wall and the German reunification, the paper was still owned by SED. The journalists had tried to manage themselves during the years of reunification - the newspaper's owner, the SED, granted greater freedom under its new name PDS.

Later the newspaper was bought by Gruner + Jahr and the British publisher Robert Maxwell. Gruner + Jahr later became sole owners and relaunched it in 1997 with a completely new design. A stated goal was to turn the Berliner Zeitung into "Germany's Washington Post". The daily says its journalists come "from east and west", and it styles itself as a "young, modern and dynamic" paper for the whole of Germany. It is the only East German paper to achieve national prominence since reunification. In 2003, the Berliner was Berlin's largest subscription newspaper—the weekend edition sells approximately 207,800 copies, with a readership of 468,000. The current editor-in-chief is Brigitte Fehrle.

Gruner + Jahr decided to leave the newspaper business and sold the Berliner Zeitung in 2002 to the publishing group Georg von Holtzbrinck. This sale was blocked by the German antitrust authorities since Holtzbrinck already owned another major Berlin newspaper, Der Tagesspiegel. The Berliner Zeitung was then sold in the fall of 2005 for an estimated 150–180 million euros to the British company Mecom Group and the American company Veronis Suhler Stevenson. The employees criticized this sale vehemently, fearing that journalistic quality could suffer as a result of excessive profit expectations by Mecom boss David Montgomery.

The Berliner Zeitung was the first German newspaper to fall under the control of foreign investors. Andrew Marr, former editor of The Independent, which like the Berliner Zeitung was taken over by David Montgomery, said of the Berliner Zeitung that "[a]nyone who was working at The Independent in the mid to late Nineties will find all this wearisomely familiar. David's obsession at that time was removing as much traditional reporting as possible from the paper and turning it into a tabloid-style scandal sheet for yuppies."

On 23 March 2009, it was announced that the Berliner Verlag would be sold by Mecom to the publisher M. DuMont Schauberg (MDS) in Cologne. The price was about 152 million Euro. Mecom was forced to sell its publishing interests in Germany as well as Norway because of heavy debts.

=== Since the takeover by Holger Friedrich ===
Holger Friedrich and his wife Silke, bouth IT-enterpreneurs, bought the Berliner Verlag in September 2019 from M. DuMont Schaumberg. This company published beside Berliner Zeitung also Berliner Kurier and Berliner Abendblatt. Friedrich wrote in the first number after he bought Berliner Zeitung, that their vision was to make politics and society more interesting again.

According to their own statement, the company was to be transformed into a "technology-driven media house". This was followed by a redesign of the newspaper and website, a relaunch of the weekend edition, a short-lived English online edition, "open source" articles, and an editorial system that also facilitates mobilewelche rolle spilet die berline rzeitung in der ddr

working for the editorial staff.

Publisher Friedrich regularly and seriously interferes with editorial work, several employees said in 2025 to die tageszeitung. According to them, Friedrich participates in editorial meetings, requests certain articles, but blocks others, dictates headlines and headings, and complains directly and in a confrontational tone to the editor when articles don't suit him. In emails obtained by taz, Friedrich gives precise instructions on how to report on certain topics.

Philippe Debionne took over as editor-in-chief of the newspaper on November 1, 2025. He previously worked for Schwäbischer Verlag as editor-in-chief of its newspapers in Mecklenburg-Western Pomerania.

In October 2024, the Berliner Zeitung entered into a cooperation agreement with state-owned China Media Group.

== Reception ==
Since Friedrich took over, the newspaper has been criticized for its stance towards Russia. On the anniversary of Russia's annexation of Crimea, the Berliner Zeitung published a guest article by Sergei Yuryevich Nechayev, the Russian ambassador to Berlin. The diplomat, who wrote two guest articles and one guest commentary for the newspaper in 2021, looked back on the day of the "reunification of Crimea with Russia." On the same day, the Ukrainian ambassador was also allowed to write about the topic. Rene Martins of MDR considers the "Berliner Zeitung's" Russia reporting problematic not only because it considers the ambassador of an autocratically governed state to be a legitimate guest author, but also because the tone of some editorial articles is similarly official as in the texts of the Russian ambassador. The newspaper adopts representations and formulations from Russia's government spokesman Dmitri Peskov - the industry service "Meedia" spoke of "a conscious decision to engage in yard reporting."

Ukrainian Ambassador to Germany Oleksii Makeiev sharply criticized Berliner Zeitung in 2024 and publicly questioned whether the Berliner Zeitung was the "new Radio Moscow." He accused the editorial team of distorting reality and publishing articles that were readily shared by the Russian embassy in Berlin.

== List of editors-in-chief ==
Tenure	Name	Image
May–July 1945	Oberst Alexander Kirsanow	
July 1945–May 1949	Rudolf Herrnstadt	
May–July 1949	Gerhard Kegel	
July–September 1949	Georg Stibi	
1949–1955	Günter Kertzscher	
1955–1957	Erich Henschke	
1957–1961	Theo Grandy	
1961–1962	Joachim Herrmann	
1962–1965	Joachim Herrmann	
1965–1972	Rolf Lehnert	
1972–1989	Dieter Kerschek	
1989–1996	Hans Eggert	
1996–1998	Michael Maier	
1999–2001	Martin E. Süskind	
2002–2006	Uwe Vorkötter	
2006–2009	Josef Depenbrock	
2009–2012	Uwe Vorkötter	
2012–2016	Brigitte Fehrle	
2016–2020	Jochen Arntz	
2020	Matthias Thieme	
2022	Tomasz Kurianowicz	
