= Berlin, Tennessee =

Unincorporated community in Tennessee, US

Berlin
- Unincorporated community
- Location in Tennessee Location in the United States
- Coordinates: 35°31′48″N 86°49′27″W
- Country: United States
- State: Tennessee
- Time zone: UTC-6 (CST)
  - Summer (DST): UTC-5 (CDT)
- ZIP code: 37091
- Area code: 931

Berlin is an unincorporated community in Marshall County, in the U.S. state of Tennessee, that lies upon U.S. Route 431, also known as Franklin Pike. It is approximately 7 miles northwest of Lewisburg and a mile from the county line of Maury County.

== History ==
During the beginning of the American Civil War, Berlin was nearly self-sufficient with its own blacksmith, stable, watermill, tanyard, grocery, and saloon, housing nearly 121 families at the time. Since the Civil War, Berlin has been in decline, with now only nearly a couple dozen of residents.

South Berlin was one of the busier stops on the Duck River Valley Narrow Gauge Railway. It operated between 1877 and 1945.

In 1925, the Berlin Rock was made a historical marker for its use as a rostrum for a multitude of political figures in Tennessee. As of that year, the Berlin Rock sat in Lewisburg as one of Marshall County's few historical markers. The following figures had spoken using the rock podium before its marking in 1925:

- Presidents: James K. Polk, Andrew Johnson
- Governors: Robert Love Taylor, Alfred A. Taylor, Benton McMillan, James B. Frazier, James C. Jones
- Senators: Alfred O. P. Nicholson, Edward Carmack
- Congressman: George W. Jones
- Judges: Terry H. Cahal, Harvey Watterson, James H. Thomas, Barclay Martin
