= Cappeln =

- Municipality
- Coat of arms

- Location of Cappeln within Cloppenburg district
- Interactive map of Cappeln
- Location within Germany Location within Lower Saxony
- Coordinates: 52°48′44″N 08°06′52″E
- Country: Germany
- State: Lower Saxony
- District: Cloppenburg

Government
  - Mayor (2021–26): Marcus Brinkmann

Area
  - Total: 76.20 km^{2} (29.42 sq mi)
- Elevation: 46 m (151 ft)

Population (2025-12-31)
  - Total: 7,534
  - Density: 98.87/km^{2} (256.1/sq mi)
- Time zone: UTC+01:00 (CET)
  - Summer (DST): UTC+02:00 (CEST)
- Postal codes: 49692
- Dialling codes: 04478
- Vehicle registration: CLP
- Website: www.cappeln.de

Cappeln (German pronunciation: [ˈkapl̩n]) is a municipality in the district of Cloppenburg, in Lower Saxony, Germany. It is situated approximately 7 km southeast of Cloppenburg.

Cappeln consists of the following rural communities:

- Cappeln including Dingel
- Tenstedt including Siehenfelde, Osterhausen, Darrenkamp and Gut Schwede
- Schwichteler with Nordenbrok and Schwichteler station
- Bokel with Wißmühlen
- Mintewede
- Elsten and Elstermoor
- Sevelten
- Warnstedt
- Nutteln/Tegelrieden

== History ==
In 1159 Cappeln became independent from nearby Emstek and founded its own parish. The name derives from the word "chapel". The old church (built in 1150) was only demolished in 1900 to make room for the current St. Peter and Paul church.

From 1914 to 1965 a local railway linked Cappeln to Cloppenburg and Vechta, first the only station was in Schwichtler.

== Sons and daughters ==
- Günter Dreyer (1943-2019), German egyptologist

== Architecture ==
- St. Peter und Paul's Church
- Pastorat, built in 1711
- Stud farm Vorwerk
- St. Mary's Church (Sevelten)
- Saint Francis of Assisi Church (Elsten)
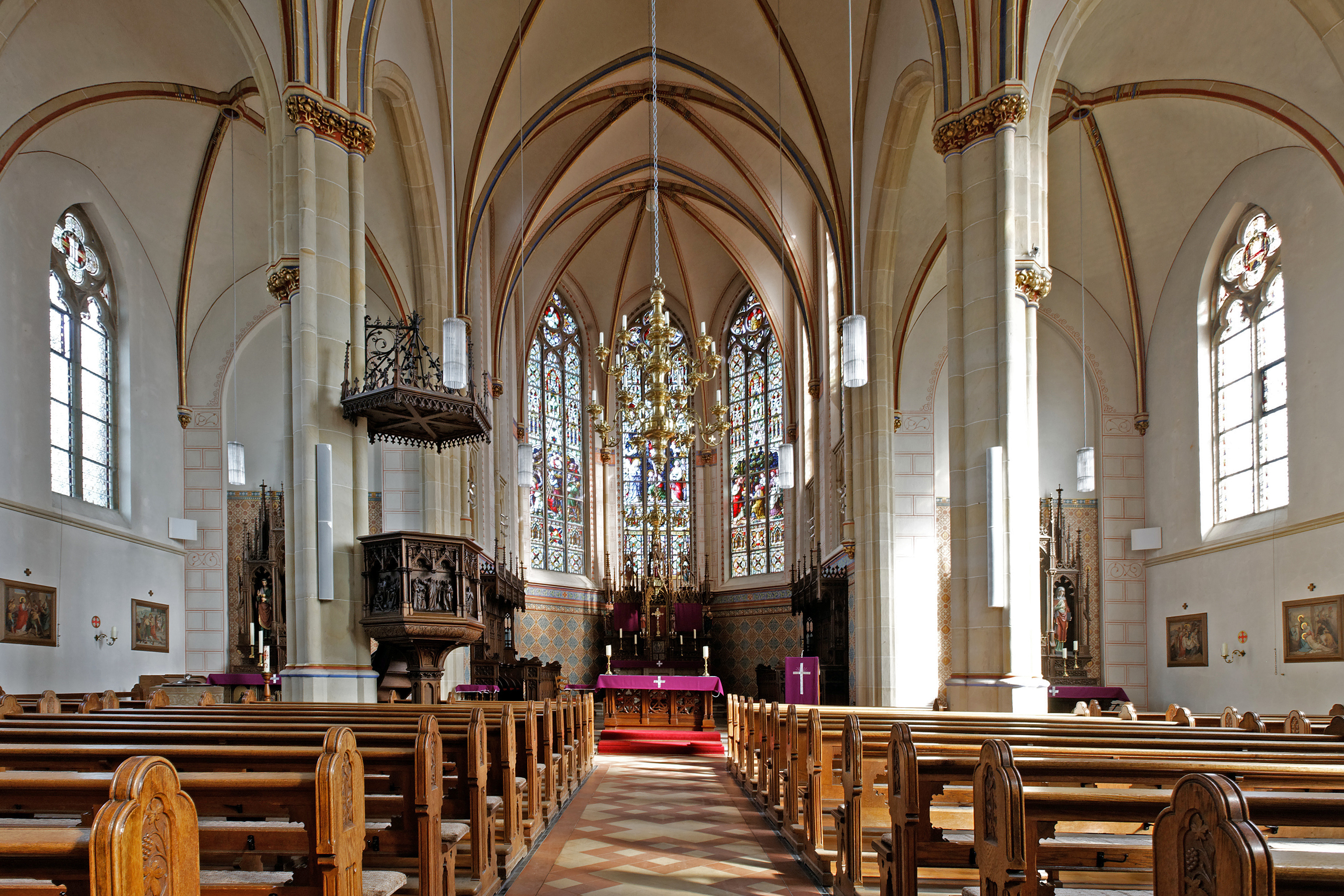
In St. Peter und Paul

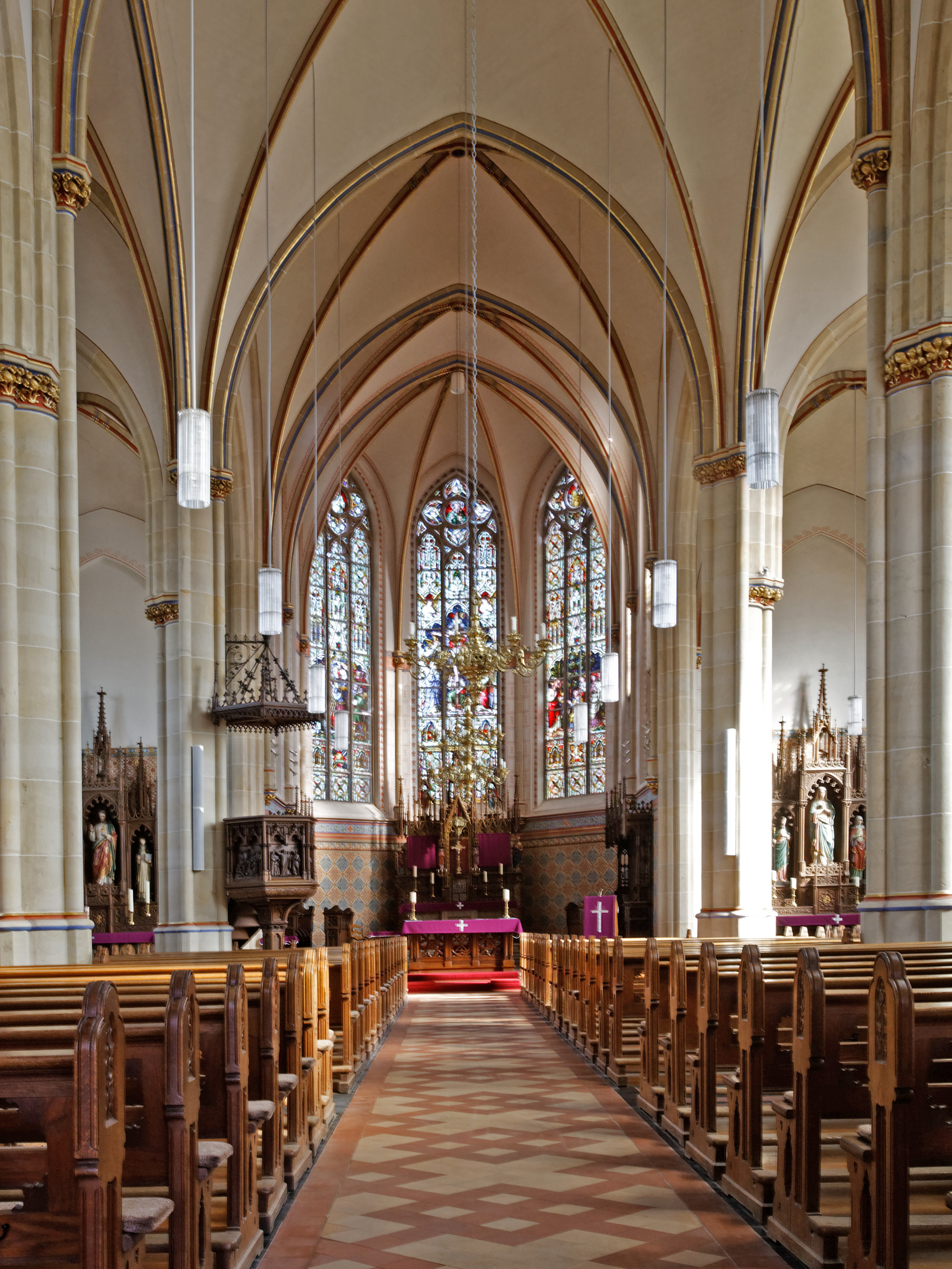
In St. Peter und Paul
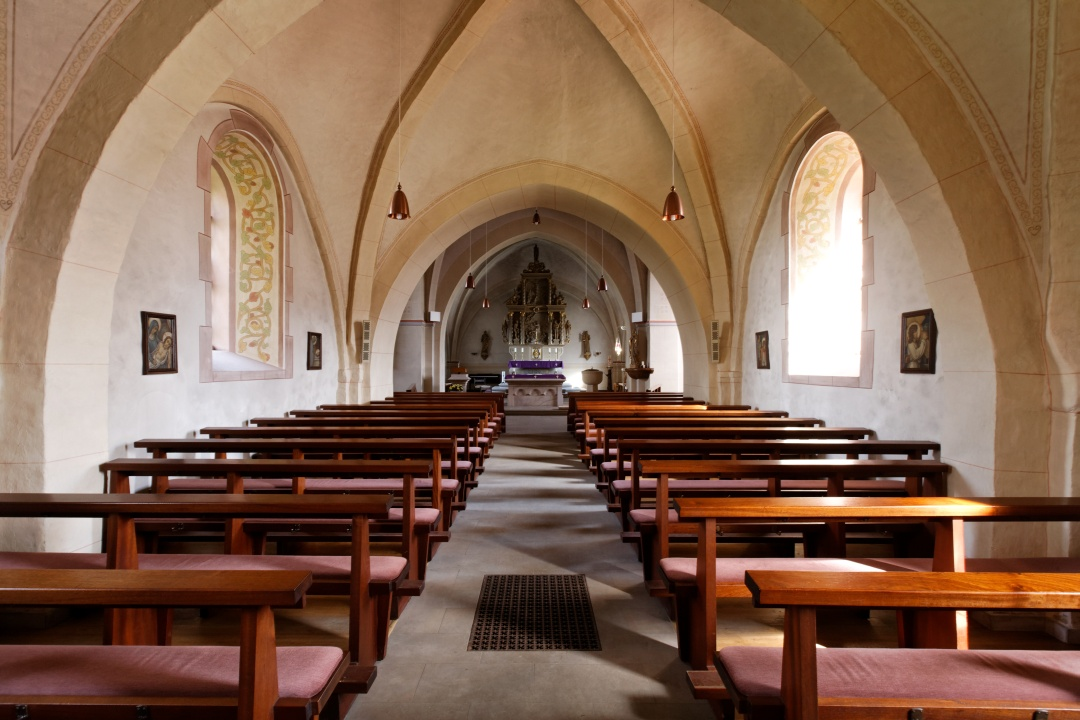
Sevelter Kirche

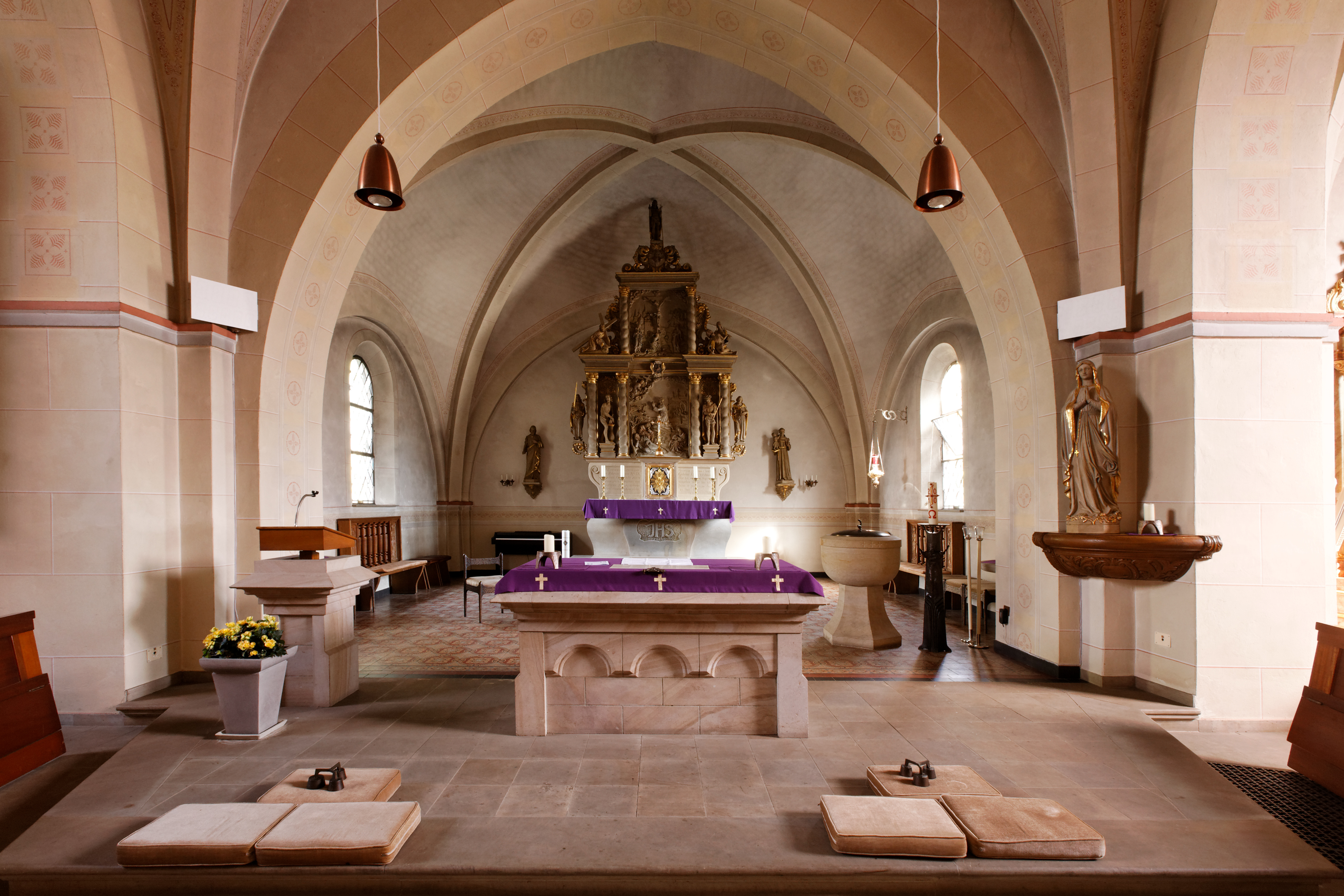
Sevelter Kirche
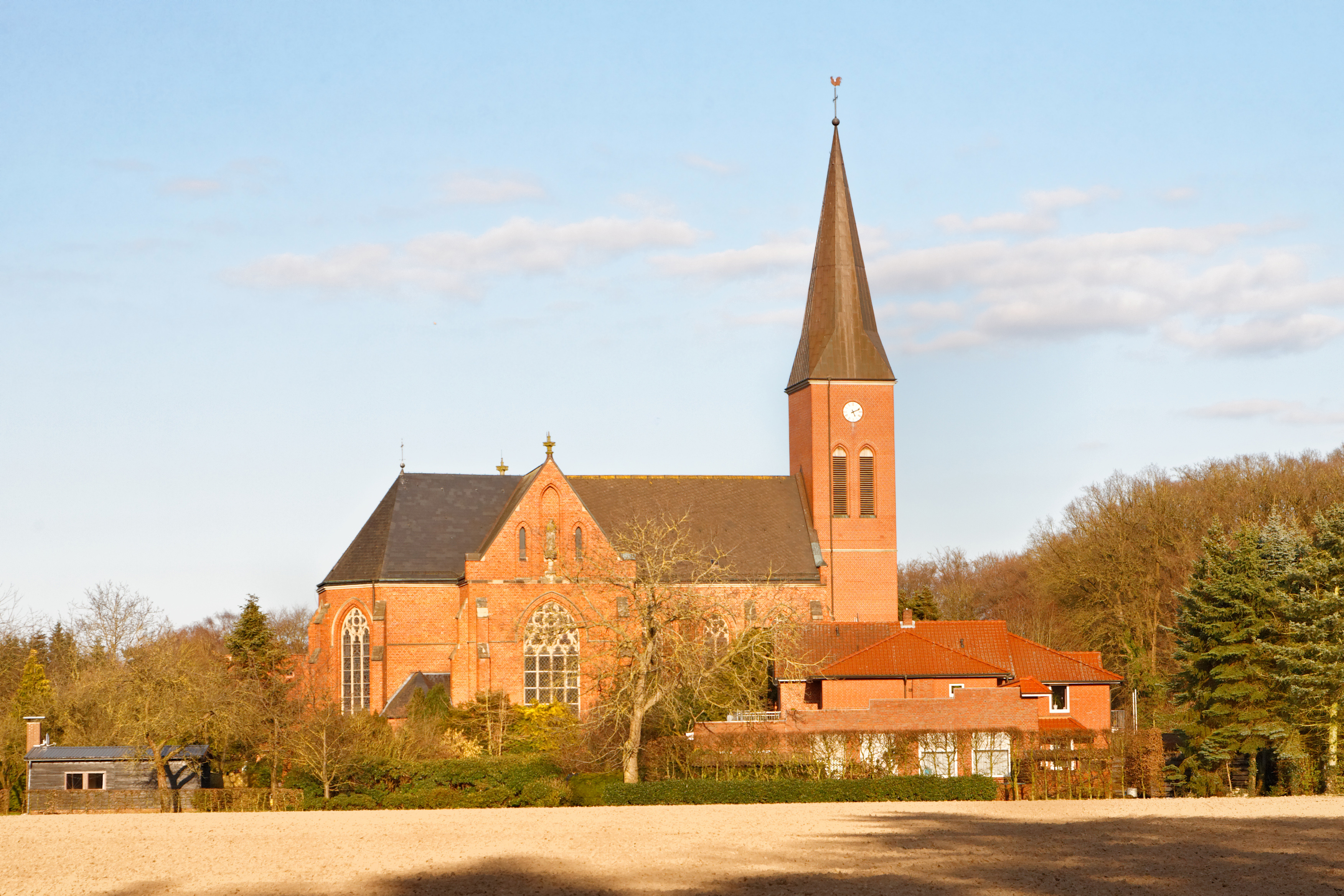
Saint Francis of Assisi Church (Elsten)
