= Berlin, Michigan =

Berlin, Michigan may refer to

- Marne, Michigan, originally Berlin, in Ottawa County
- Berlin Township, Ionia County, Michigan
  - Berlin Center, Michigan, within that township
- Berlin Township, St. Clair County, Michigan
- Berlin Charter Township, Michigan, in Monroe County
