= The Berliner (magazine) =

English-language magazine in Berlin

The July–August edition of the Exberliner

The Berliner (formerly Exberliner) is an English-language magazine published in Berlin that was founded in 2002 by Ioana Veleanu, the editor of The Village Voice, Maurice Frank of Deutsche Welle and Nadja Vancauwenberghe, an AFP correspondent in Moscow.

The magazine is published monthly (except for a summer double issue), and is generally available at newsstands around the city or by subscription. The magazine offers listings, reviews, journalistic articles, opinion columns, and a cultural guide, which are also continually updated online.

The magazine was launched as a free newspaper in 2002 named The Berliner but was forced to change the name, which was already trademarked. The magazine then relaunched a few months after its initial release as Exberliner.

In 2021, the magazine became part of the Tip Berlin Media Group, owners of Tip. The magazine marked its twentieth anniversary in 2022. In 2024, after over two decades as Exberliner, the magazine was renamed back to its original title, The Berliner.

In February 2023, Nadja Vancauwenberghe, the last remaining founding member of The Berliner, was dismissed from her long-held role as Editor-in-Chief.
