= Berliner Woche =

German weekly advertising magazine

- Editor: Helmut Herold
- Categories: Advertising magazine
- Founded: May 1983
- Company: Funke Mediengruppe
- Country: Germany
- Based in: Berlin
- Language: German
- Website: www.berliner-woche.de

Berliner Woche (until September 2003: Berliner Wochenblatt/Hallo Berlin Wochenblatt) is a weekly advertising magazine in Berlin. The magazine, financed by advertising revenues, is published every Wednesday in 32 different local editions for the districts of Berlin. The total circulation is over one and a half million copies. Two local editions are published under the traditional title Spandauer Volksblatt.

== History and profile ==
The first issue was published in May 1983 in the district of Neukölln. The Spandauer Volksblatt had already existed as a daily newspaper since March 1946. Axel Springer Verlag took over the title in 1993 and continued the paper as an advertising magazine. All local editions are published by Berliner Wochenblatt Verlag GmbH, a subsidiary of Funke Mediengruppe (until 30 April 2014: Axel Springer SE).

The editorial focus is on reporting from the twelve Berlin administrative districts and the 96 districts. On average, all local editions are read by 1.799 million readers.
