= Otoe, Nebraska =

- Village
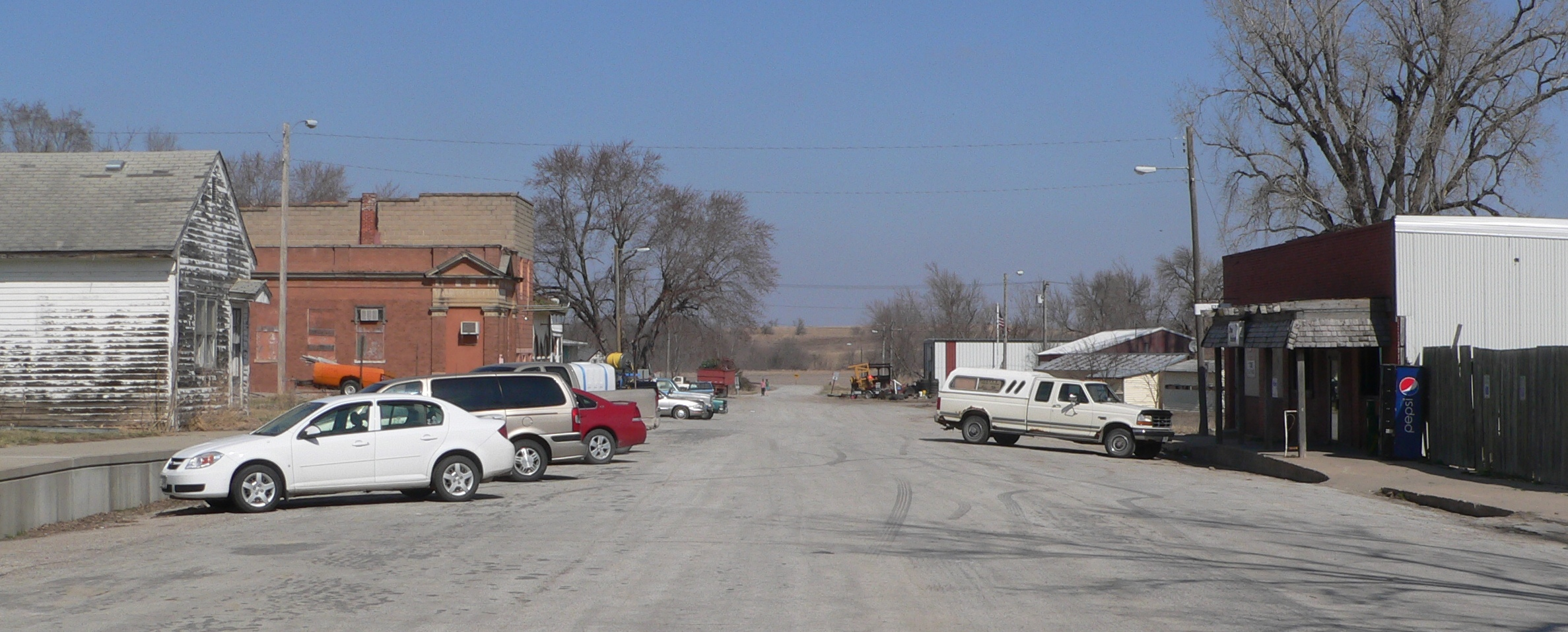
- Downtown Otoe

- Location of Otoe, Nebraska
- Coordinates: 40°43′29″N 96°07′14″W
- Country: United States
- State: Nebraska
- County: Otoe

Area
  - Total: 0.16 sq mi (0.41 km^{2})
  - Land: 0.16 sq mi (0.41 km^{2})
  - Water: 0 sq mi (0.00 km^{2})
- Elevation: 1,132 ft (345 m)

Population (2020)
  - Total: 161
  - Density: 1,010.6/sq mi (390.18/km^{2})
- Time zone: UTC-6 (Central (CST))
  - Summer (DST): UTC-5 (CDT)
- ZIP code: 68417
- Area code: 402
- FIPS code: 31-37630
- GNIS feature ID: 2399595

Otoe is a village in north central Otoe County, Nebraska, United States. The population was 161 at the 2020 census.

== History ==
The village was established in 1880 on the proposed line of the Missouri Pacific Railroad from Kansas City to Omaha. The town was originally named Berlin; many of the early inhabitants were German Lutherans. In 1896, when the population reached 200, the town incorporated. It survived and rebuilt after a tornado in 1913 destroyed most of its businesses.

The entry of the United States into World War I was followed by anti-German sentiment, which extended to a town that bore the name of Germany's capital. A 1918 series of fires that destroyed a block of the town's main street was attributed to anti-German crusaders. In October 1918, less than a month before the war's end, the town's name was changed to its current Otoe. Berlin Precinct was left unchanged, however.

Passenger rail service to Otoe was discontinued in 1932; despite this setback, the town continued to grow, reaching its maximum historical population of 298 in the 1940 census. Following World War II, the population began to decline. In 1958, the high school was closed; in the 1960s, the railroad line through Otoe was abandoned.

== Geography ==
According to the United States Census Bureau, the village has a total area of 0.16 square miles (0.41 km^{2}), all land.

== Demographics ==
Historical population
Census	Pop.	Note	%±
1900	150		—
1910	196		30.7%
1920	261		33.2%
1930	263		0.8%
1940	298		13.3%
1950	230		−22.8%
1960	225		−2.2%
1970	204		−9.3%
1980	197		−3.4%
1990	196		−0.5%
2000	217		10.7%
2010	171		−21.2%
2020	161		−5.8%
U.S. Decennial Census; 2012 Estimate

=== 2010 census ===
As of the census of 2010, there were 171 people, 67 households, and 45 families residing in the village. The population density was 1,068.8 inhabitants per square mile (412.7/km^{2}). There were 80 housing units at an average density of 500.0 per square mile (193.1/km^{2}). The racial makeup of the village was 95.3% White, 1.2% Native American, 2.3% from other races, and 1.2% from two or more races. Hispanic or Latino of any race were 2.3% of the population.

There were 67 households, of which 28.4% had children under the age of 18 living with them, 44.8% were married couples living together, 13.4% had a female householder with no husband present, 9.0% had a male householder with no wife present, and 32.8% were non-families. 28.4% of all households were made up of individuals, and 12% had someone living alone who was 65 years of age or older. The average household size was 2.55 and the average family size was 3.13.

The median age in the village was 36.6 years. 25.1% of residents were under the age of 18; 10.5% were between the ages of 18 and 24; 19.2% were from 25 to 44; 26.8% were from 45 to 64; and 18.1% were 65 years of age or older. The gender makeup of the village was 55.6% male and 44.4% female.

=== 2000 census ===
As of the census of 2000, there were 217 people, 83 households, and 60 families residing in the village. The population density was 1,372.8 inhabitants per square mile (530.0/km^{2}). There were 94 housing units at an average density of 594.6 per square mile (229.6/km^{2}). The racial makeup of the village was 99.54% White, and 0.46% from two or more races. Hispanic or Latino of any race were 0.46% of the population.

There were 83 households, out of which 37.3% had children under the age of 18 living with them, 60.2% were married couples living together, 6.0% had a female householder with no husband present, and 27.7% were non-families. 26.5% of all households were made up of individuals, and 9.6% had someone living alone who was 65 years of age or older. The average household size was 2.61 and the average family size was 3.13.

In the village, the population was spread out, with 31.8% under the age of 18, 5.1% from 18 to 24, 26.3% from 25 to 44, 18.9% from 45 to 64, and 18.0% who were 65 years of age or older. The median age was 36 years. For every 100 females, there were 110.7 males. For every 100 females age 18 and over, there were 102.7 males.

As of 2000 the median income for a household in the village was $33,125, and the median income for a family was $36,875. Males had a median income of $34,375 versus $20,833 for females. The per capita income for the village was $12,461. None of the families and 2.8% of the population were living below the poverty line, including no under eighteens and 4.0% of those over 64.
