= Schluersburg, Missouri =

Unincorporated community in Missouri, U.S.

Coordinates: 38°37′50″N 90°51′35″W

Schluersburg is an unincorporated hamlet in St. Charles County, in the U.S. state of Missouri.

== History ==
A post office was established at Schluersburg in 1862, and remained in operation until 1908. According to tradition, the community took its name from a town of the same name in Germany.
