= Genevra, California =

Unincorporated community in California, United States

Genevra
- Unincorporated community
- Location in California Genevra (the United States)
- Coordinates: 39°04′12″N 122°05′30″W
- Country: United States
- State: California
- County: Colusa
- Elevation: 98 ft (30 m)

Genevra (formerly, Berlin and Genevra Station) was an unincorporated community in Colusa County, California, United States. The town was once the location of a depot on the Southern Pacific Railroad, as well as a blacksmith shop, store, post office, and warehouse, as well as plans for a school, a large hotel, and 15 to 20 houses. In 1890, between 80 and 100 residents lived in the community, which was at one time on California State Highway 7 between Arbuckle and Williams. In later years, the community declined.

== Geography ==
Genevra lies at an elevation of 98 feet (30 m). The community lies 11 miles (18 km) from Colusa, the county seat. It is located along the Woodland Line of the Southern Pacific Railroad.

== History ==
=== 19th century ===
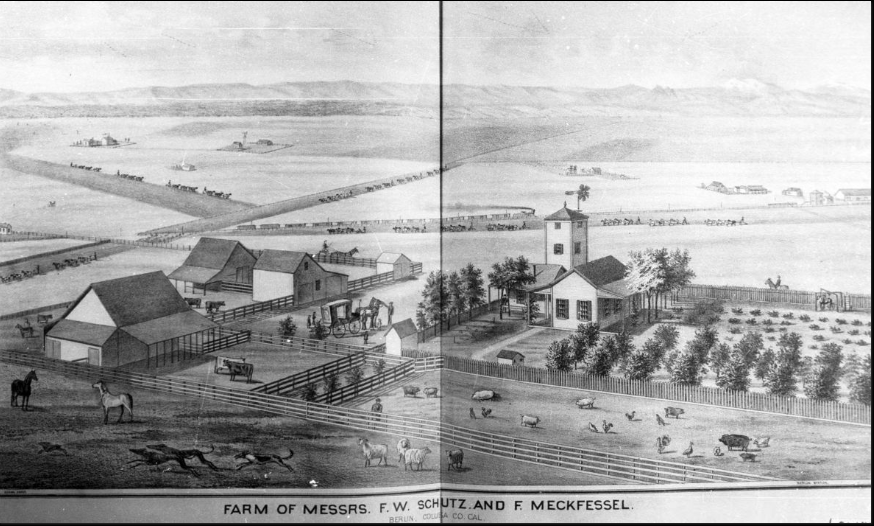
Schultz (Schutz) and Meckfessel farm, Berlin, California, 1880

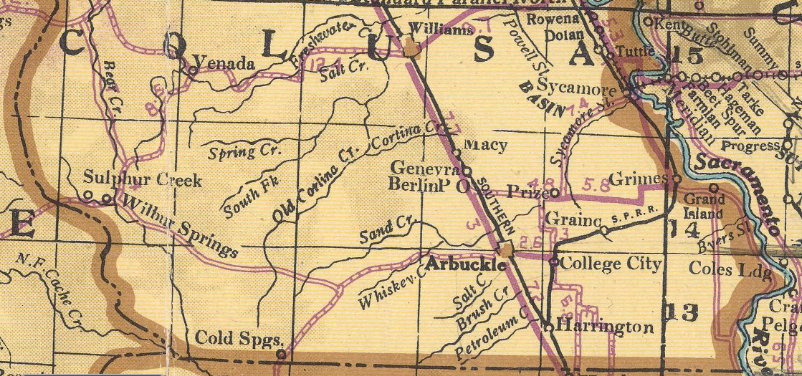
Southern Colusa County, 1927, showing the location of Genevra (Berlin), between Williams and Arbuckle

The place was named Berlin in the 1870s by officials of the Southern Pacific Railroad on whose tracks it was established. The post office was established in 1876, with F.A. Wholfrom named as postmaster.

In 1881, there were plans to plat a townsite in Berlin, with a reporter at the Sacramento Daily Record Union writing, "There is a scheme now on foot that will give Berlin (Colusa county) a business boom this fall, that will bring her up to favorable comparison with other railroad towns in Colusa county. I refer to the recent organization of the McAsh and Schultzfessel Improvement Company, of Berlin. The object of this company is the laying out of a new town on the site now occupied by Berlin, the building of a large and commodious brick hotel, and public school-house, erecting fifteen or twenty first-class dwelling houses to rent, likewise to put up a depot building of same style and dimensions as the one at Maxwell station. Said building to be presented or sold to the Central Pacific Railroad Company[...]".

In 1891, Berlin was one of the towns on the rail line between Arbuckle and Williams, having what was described at that time as a "large warehouse" and being a shipping point for grain. At that time, the community had a post office, store, and a blacksmith shop, in addition to the warehouse buildings, which constituted the main places of business. There was also a railroad depot, a water tank, and a pump house. There were between 80 and 100 residents in 1890.

Among the early residents of Berlin was Frederick W. Schultz Jr. (b. 1872), the president and founder of the Arbuckle-Rochdale Company. Schultz was born in Berlin and lived there (and in a number of other California towns) for many years. A 1913 biography stated that he was well-liked in Berlin, and that his home there was "one of the finest places in Colusa County". Berlin was served by the Webster School District; Schultz's father, Frederick Sr., served as a clerk for the school district, which had enrolled over 300 students in 1881.

=== 20th century ===
In 1914, Berlin was connected to the California State Highway system. State Route 7 passed through Berlin, with a section of the road (Section A) having been run from the southern boundary of Colusa County to Berlin, and being laid out on May 27, 1914. The cost was $108,550. Section B of the highway would run from Berlin to Colusa Junction, while Section C would complete the route to the northern boundary of the county. The highway was said to be a "wide, good road" in 1915.

The place was renamed from Berlin to Genevra during World War I. According to one source, the name change occurred when officials at the Southern Pacific Railroad replaced the name originally given by the Northern Railway. The name of the community was changed at the request of area farmers, who wanted a name which reflected the values of the United States. According to one local history, "During the war years anything German was taboo so the railroad changed the name Berlin to Geneva [sic]; however, the post office retained the name Berlin" A 1913 California tourism guide mentions both names: "the [county] road follows the general course of the railway. From Arbuckle the route runs through Genevra (Berlin, 4) and Macy(1) to Williams (5)."

By the early 20th century, Berlin/Genevra was in decline, with one county historian writing, "Sites, Lodoga, Leesville, Sulphur Creek, Venado, Berlin, Colusa Junction, Delevan and Sycamore are very small places, all of which, except Colusa Junction and Sulphur Creek, have post offices, and most of which were at one time more prosperous than they are today." The population of the community was 25 in 1927.

In 1928, residents of the area contemplated building a grain elevator in the community; an announcement of the proposal appeared in Building and Engineering News. The Berlin post office closed in 1934, due to lack of patrons. The building was later razed.

By the 1930s, the highway that passed through Genevra on the route from Arbuckle to Williams was now numbered US Route 99. The population was 25 in 1940.

Between 1957 and 1964, US Route 99 was converted to freeway. Route 99 officially became Interstate 5 that year. A partial rerouting of the area roads took place: "Upon entering Arbuckle, US [route] 99W/LRN 7 used 5th Street. US 99W/LRN 7 then followed Frontage Road north from Arbuckle through Genevra and Macy, and passed through Williams via 7th Street". While Genevra still appears on state and county maps, the site is a ghost town.

== See also ==
- Waikosel, California
