= Berlin Township =

Berlin Township may refer to:

- Berlin Township, Bureau County, Illinois
- Berlin Township, Ionia County, Michigan
- Berlin Charter Township, Michigan, in Monroe County
- Berlin Township, St. Clair County, Michigan
- Berlin Township, Minnesota
- Berlin Township, New Jersey
- Berlin Township, Cass County, North Dakota, in Cass County, North Dakota
- Berlin Township, Sheridan County, North Dakota, in Sheridan County, North Dakota
- Berlin Township, Wells County, North Dakota, in Wells County, North Dakota
- Berlin Township, Delaware County, Ohio
- Berlin Township, Erie County, Ohio
- Berlin Township, Holmes County, Ohio
- Berlin Township, Knox County, Ohio
- Berlin Township, Mahoning County, Ohio
- Berlin Township, Pennsylvania

== See also ==
- Berlin (disambiguation)
