= Berlino =

Mascot character

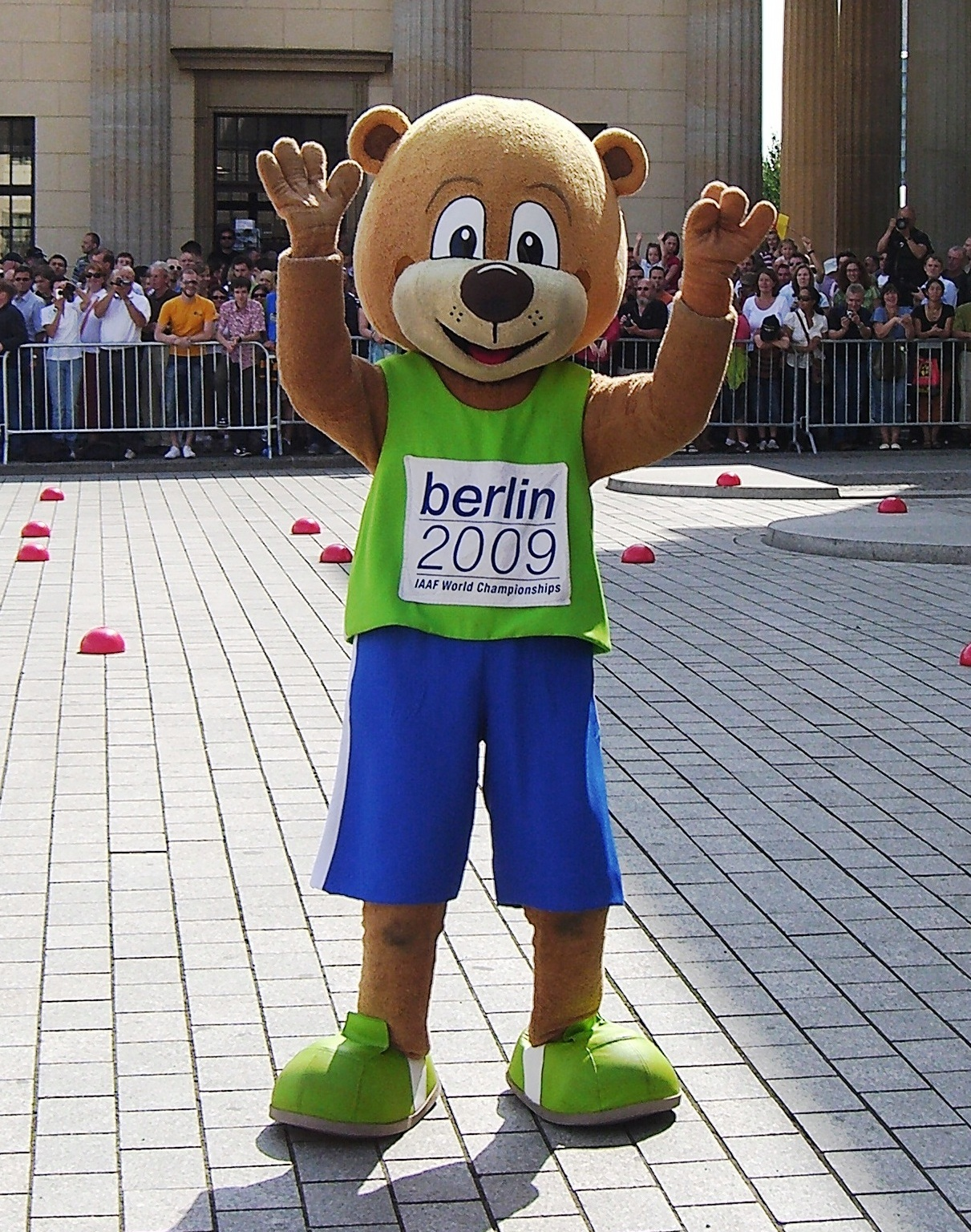
Mascot "Berlino"

Berlino, an anthropomorphic bear, was the mascot of the 2009 World Championships in Athletics and 2018 European Athletics Championships held in Berlin, Germany, noted for his hyperactivity and celebrations with various athletes during the Championships.

== Overview ==
Up until now, Berlino appears to be mute. However, this condition does not seem to prevent him from giving interviews to the media.

Berlino has been referred to as the "star" of the 2009 Championships and been noted by athletes, such as Usain Bolt by wearing a T-shirt with "ICH BIN EIN BERLINO" ("I am a Berlino", referring to John F. Kennedy's famous West Berlin speech) written on it during warm up for the 200 meter final.

The iconic image of the games is the famous photograph of Berlino and Usain Bolt down on one knee, twinned in mutual respect, sharing a mimed lightning-bolt pose to celebrate victory and a new world record.

In an interview, published after the World Championships in Berlin, Usain Bolt said: "Berlino and I have become friends. We exchanged telephone numbers."

While celebrating winning the gold in 400 meter hurdles, Melaine Walker took a piggy-back off Berlino, who promptly ran into a stack of hurdles. The diverse videos of this have been watched over 400,000 times (26.08.2009) and have been called "a YouTube classic."

He was also involved in some controversy during the men's 10,000m final in which he ran part of the race down the back straight with the athletes cheering them on. This annoyed some traditionalists and it was rumoured that the IAAF told him to reel in the enthusiasm after this act.

Smaller versions of Berlino - Berlino teddies as well as Berlino key rings, both produced in China - were offered via Internet and in Berlin Tourist shops during the 2009 World Championships in Athletics in August 2009. After being delivered in the beginning of August 2009, the Berlino teddies at first sold slow. Due to the increasing popularity of the mascot during the games, Berlino soon became a bestseller and - before the end of the games - was out of stock.

Berlino later made a guest appearance at the UKA Aviva British Grand Prix, in Gateshead, on 31 August 2009, alongside the British mascot, Spike.

Tournament officials refused to publicly disclose who played the part of Berlino. However, the Guardian Observer reported that it was 33-year-old Berlin actor Oliver Seiffert.

In 2018 Berlino reappeared as the official mascot at the Berlin Olympic Stadium for the 24th European Athletics Championships being hosted in the city.

== Notable incidents ==
- Racing Usain Bolt around the track after his new 200 metres world record. Lockeres Jogging mit Usain Bolt. - Fotostrecken - Mediacenter - Tagesspiegel
- Striking the lightning-bolt victory pose with Usain, both on one knee with one raised arm. 19 Clubs auf einem Ticket - Zeitung Heute - Tagesspiegel
- Presenting his undershirt with words: "Ich bin ein Bolt" after Usain Bolt presented his own T-shirt with "Ich bin ein Berlino" written on it. Bolt ist ein Berlino - und Berlino ist ein Bolt. Champion und Maskottchen haben sich angefreundet. - Tagesspiegel Der Weltrekordler Bolt zollte dem Maskottchen fast schon kennedyesk Respekt. - Fotostrecken - Mediacenter - Tagesspiegel
- Picking up Polish athlete Anna Rogowska and swinging her around after she clinched gold in the women's pole vault.
- Leaping on top of javelin champion Steffi Nerius of Germany.
- Being picked up by men's discus champion Robert Harting, who threw Berlino over his shoulders after winning gold. ...und wirbelte es durch die Luft. - Fotostrecken - Mediacenter - Tagesspiegel
- Racewalking under the Brandenburg Gate with the 50 km medalists.
- Running down the home straight alongside competing athletes in the men's 10,000 metres.
- Ripping his vest off Harting style, celebrating with the German hammer thrower Betty Heidler after winning the silver medal.
- Giving 400m hurdles champion Melaine Walker of Jamaica a piggy back ride, and while doing so crashing into a stack of hurdles.
- Handkissing German heptathlete Jennifer Oeser after she had won the silver medal.
- Being picked up by Polish hammer throw world champion Anita Włodarczyk.

== See also ==
- Flag of Berlin
- Coat of arms of Berlin
- Berolina, personification of Berlin
