= Paradise Township, Pennsylvania =

Paradise Township is the name of some places in the U.S. state of Pennsylvania:

- Paradise Township, Lancaster County, Pennsylvania
- Paradise Township, Monroe County, Pennsylvania
- Paradise Township, York County, Pennsylvania
