= Berlin Bear =

Berlin Bear may refer to:

- Berlin Bear (German: Berliner Bär), shown on the coat of arms of Berlin
- Berlin Bear sculptures, created by Renée Sintenis, used as the basis for the
  - Golden Bear, an award at the Berlinale
- Buddy Bears, life-size fiberglass bear sculptures developed by Klaus and Eva Herlitz
