= Swigart's Mill =

- U.S. National Register of Historic Places
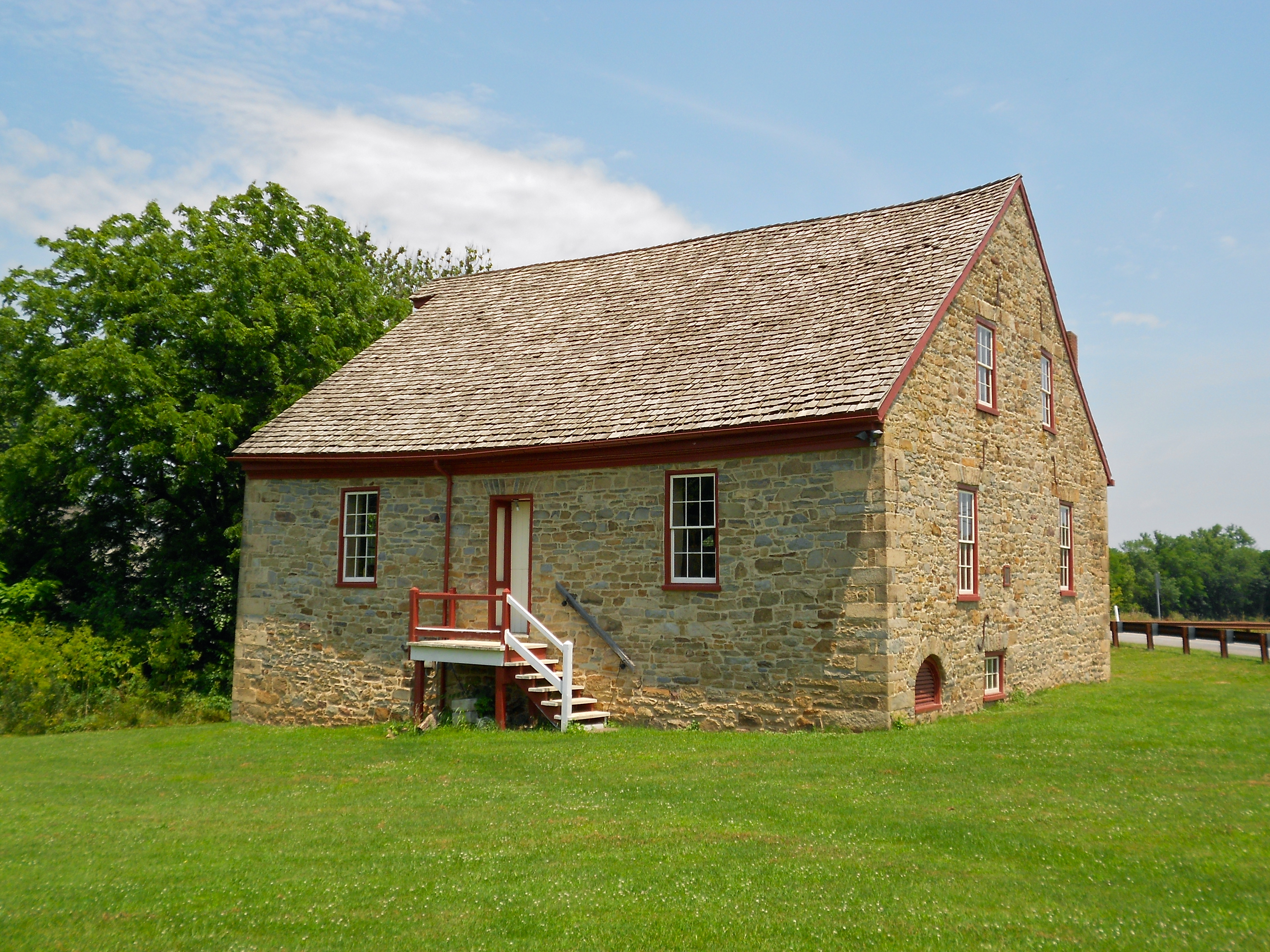
- View from the southeast

- Location within Pennsylvania Location within the United States
- Location: North of Hanover on Berlin Road, Paradise Township, Pennsylvania
- Coordinates: 39°56′5″N 76°58′19″W
- Area: 1 acre (0.40 ha)
- Built: 1794
- Built by: Nagle, John
- NRHP reference No.: 80003649
- Added to NRHP: July 23, 1980

Swigart's Mill, also known as Beaver Creek Mill, is a historic grist mill located at Paradise Township, York County, Pennsylvania. It was built in 1794, and is a 2 1/2-story, stone building measuring 45 feet, 6 inches, by 40 feet, 8 inches. It is three bays by three bays and has a gable roof. The mill operated until about 1920.

Just across Beaver Creek to the west is the town of East Berlin, Pennsylvania and the East Berlin Historic District, which are in Adams County. The mill was added to the National Register of Historic Places in 1980.

Swigart's Mill slideshow
