= East Berlin Historic District =

Historic district in Pennsylvania, United States

- U.S. National Register of Historic Places
- U.S. Historic district
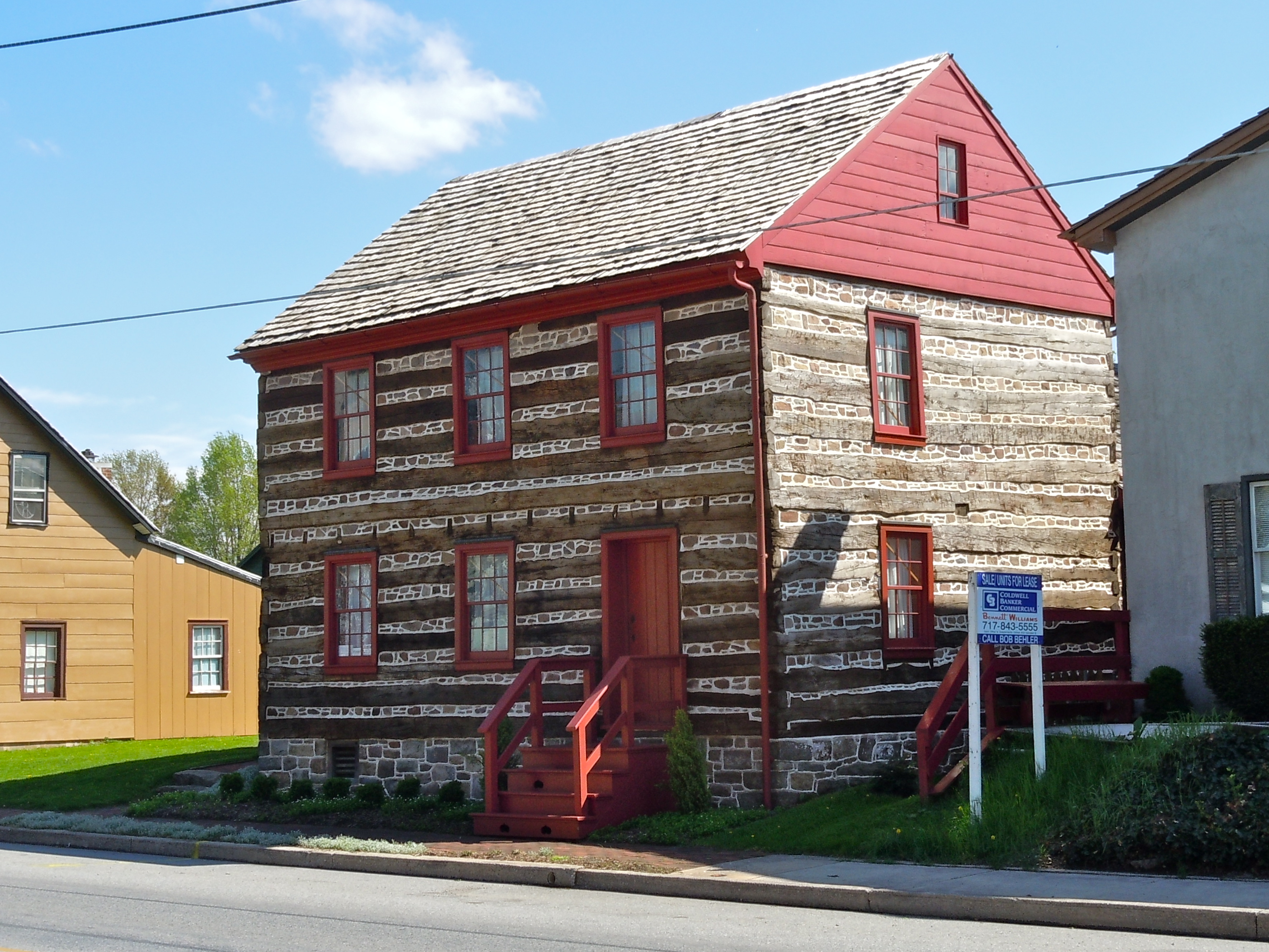
- East Berlin Log Cabin, April 2011

- Location within Pennsylvania Location within the United States
- Location: Portions of King, Harrisburg and Abbottstown St., East Berlin, Pennsylvania
- Coordinates: 39°56′17″N 76°58′56″W
- Area: 40 acres (16 ha)
- Architect: Multiple
- Architectural style: Late Victorian, Georgian, Federal
- NRHP reference No.: 85002693
- Added to NRHP: September 30, 1985

East Berlin Historic District is a national historic district located at East Berlin in Adams County, Pennsylvania, United States. The district includes 177 contributing buildings in the central business district and surrounding residential areas of East Berlin. They primarily date from the third quarter of the 18th to the early-20th century. It includes a notable collection of 18th century log and stone dwellings. Notable buildings include 426 W. King Street (c. 1780), 414 W. King Street, 412 W. King Street (1790), 400 W. King Street (1897), 210 W. King Street (c. 1860), 200–202 W. King Street, 110 W. King Street, 105–107 W. King Street, 127 W. King Street, 529 W. King Street, 115–117 E. King Street, 119–121 E. King Street, 104 Fourth Street (East Berlin Jaycees Hall), and Church School House.

It was listed on the National Register of Historic Places in 1985.

== Gallery ==
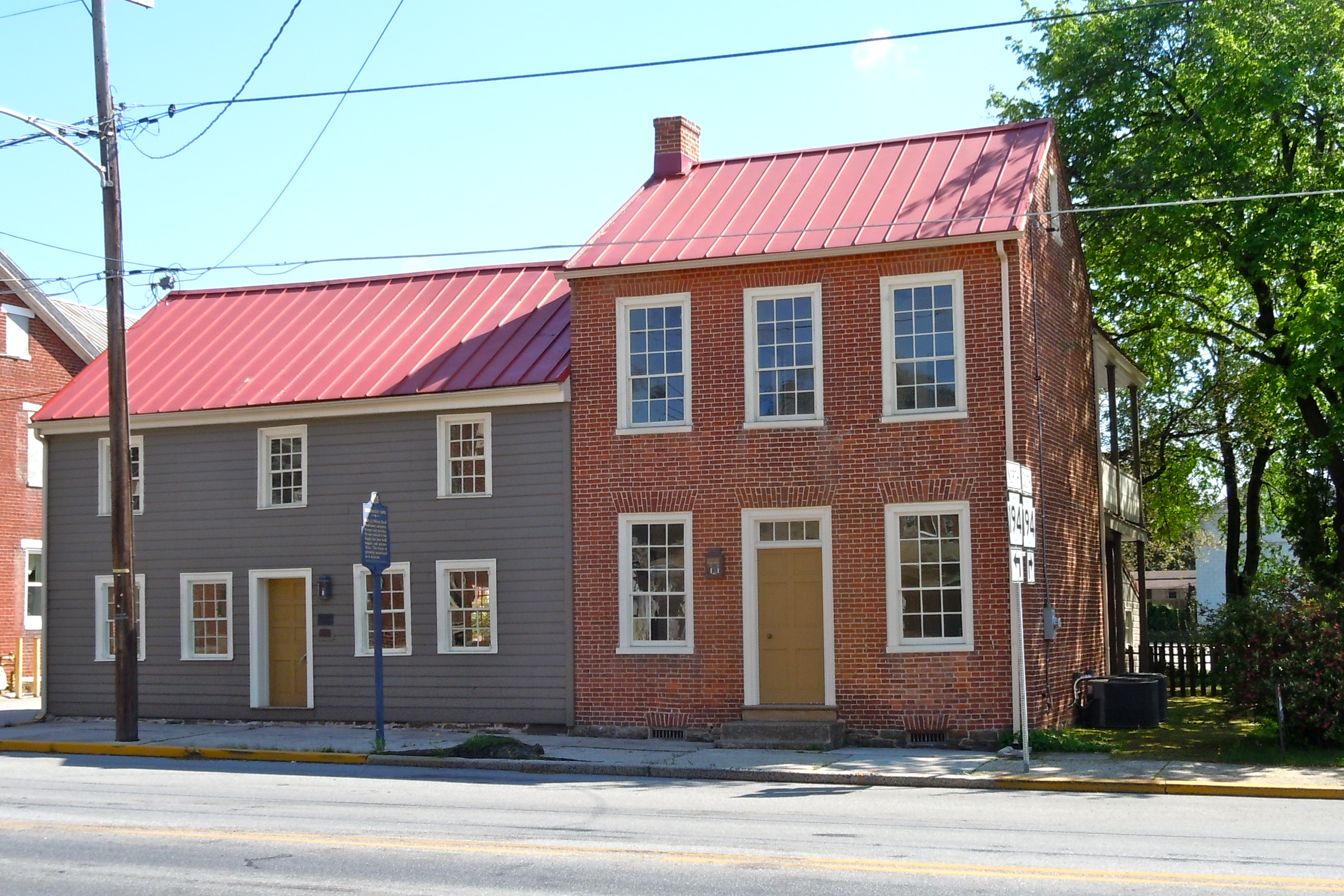
David Studebaker house

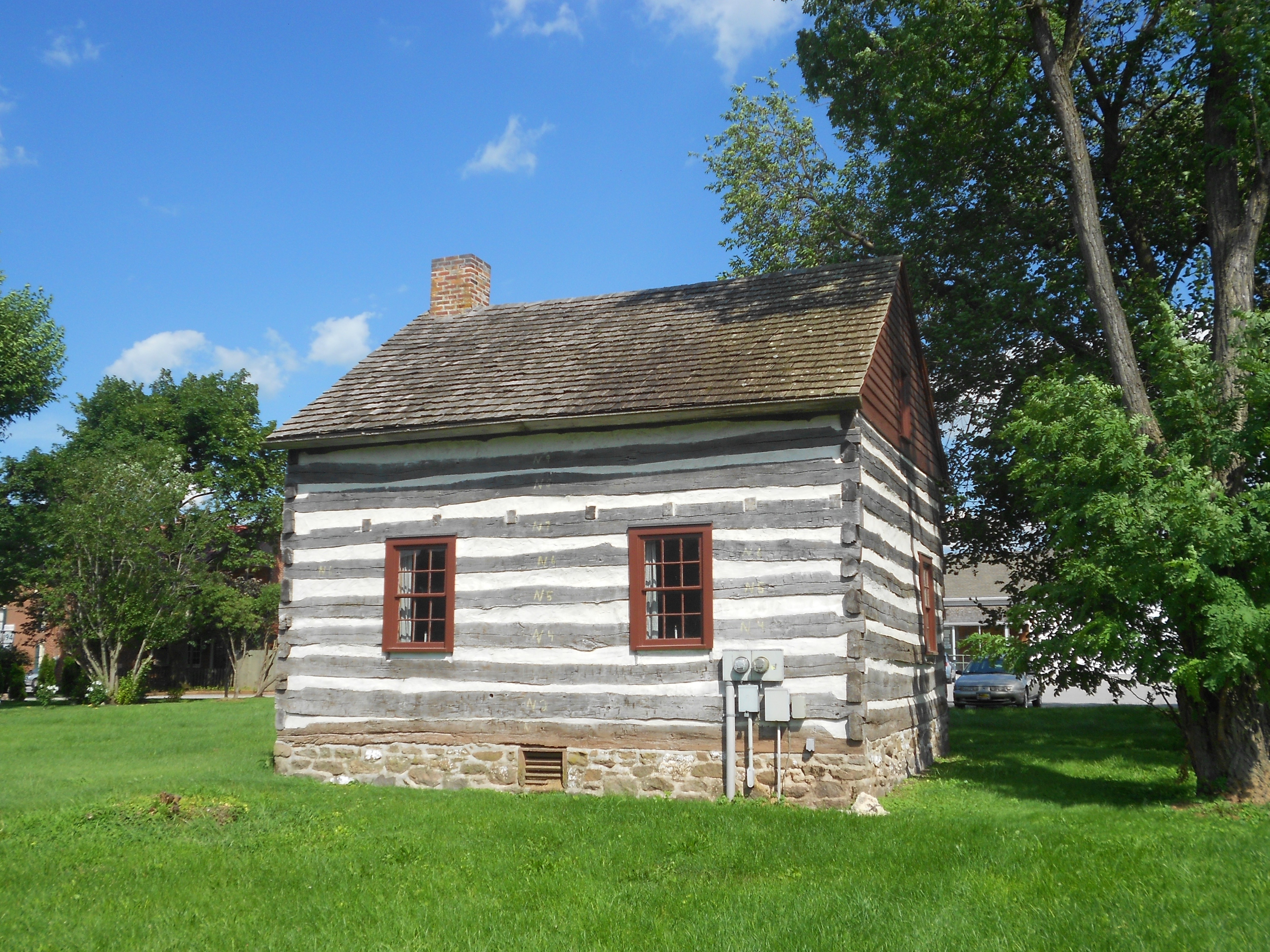
Old log cabin that was moved to a site behind the post office

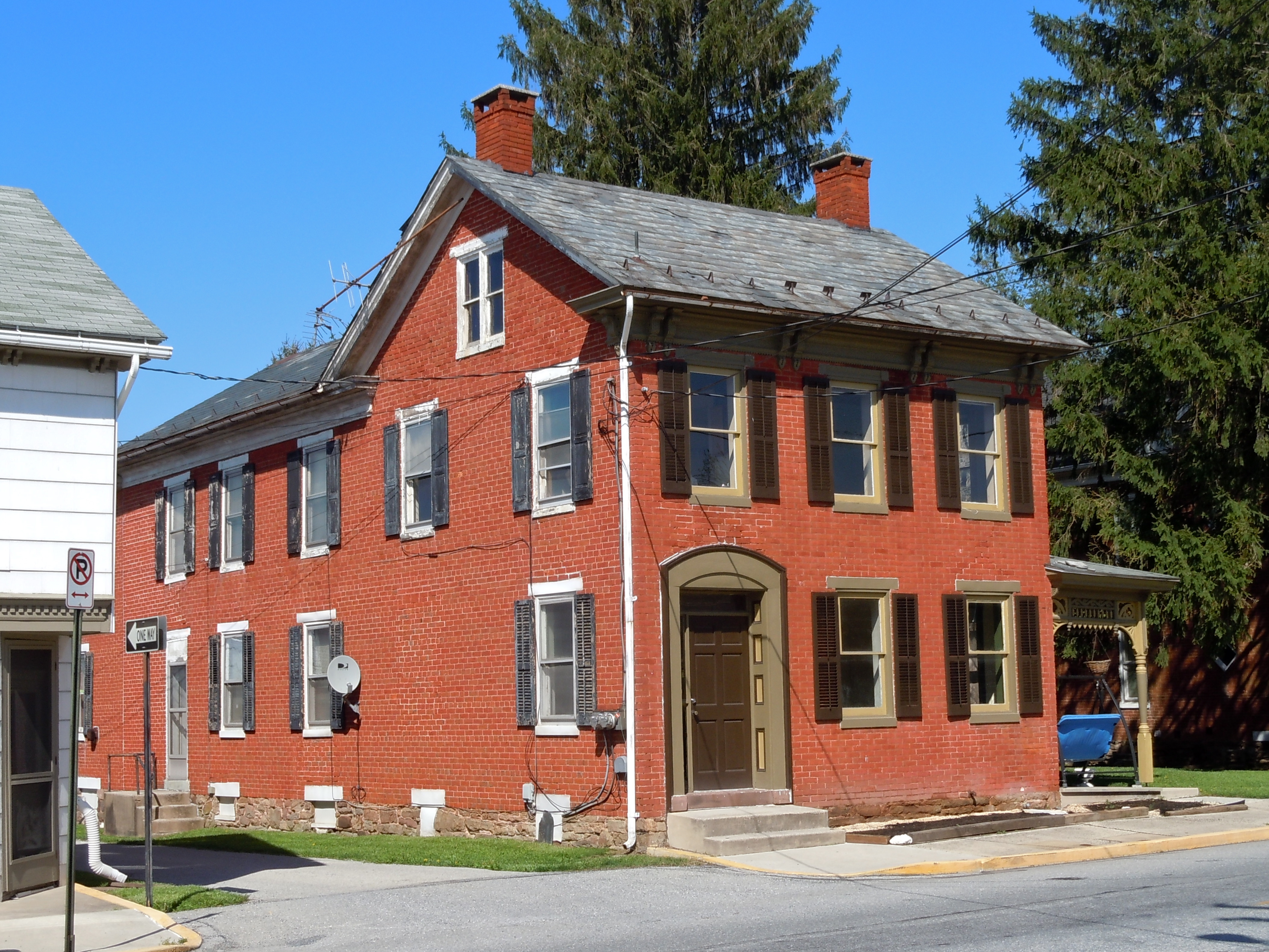
House on E. North Street

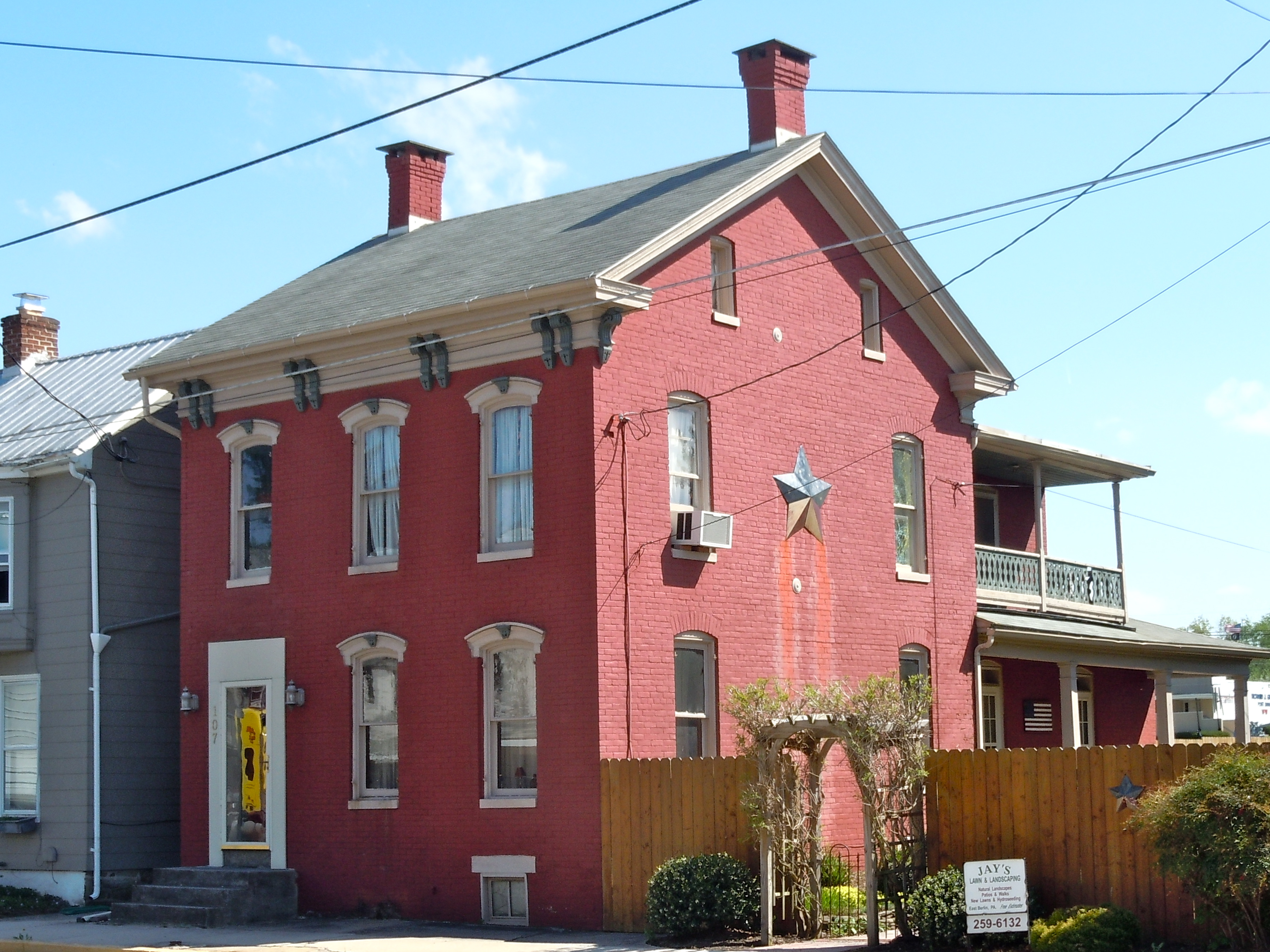
107 E. King Street

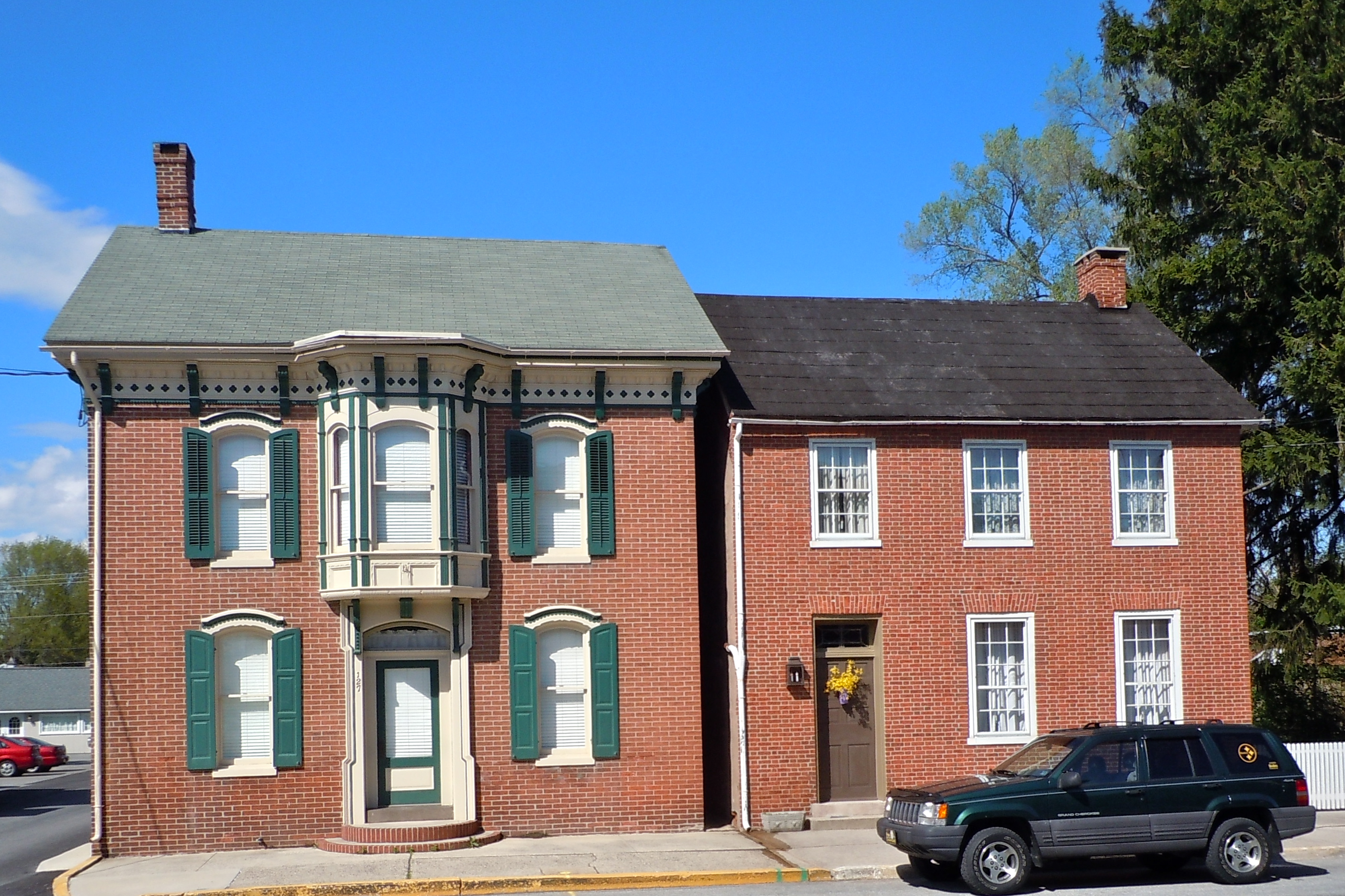
125-127 W. King Street

== See also ==
- Swigart's Mill
