= Coat of arms of Berlin =

Versions
- Escutcheon-only version
- Armiger: City of Berlin
- Crest: A city coronet Or with five leaves and a gate
- Shield: Argent a bear rampant Sable langued and armed Gules
- Use: The state logo may be used by the general public while the coat of arms proper is only eligible for use with authorities.

The coat of arms of Berlin is used by the German city state as well as the city itself. Introduced in 1954 for West Berlin, it shows a black bear on a white shield. On top of the shield is a special crown, created by the amalgamation of the mural crown of a city with the so-called people's crown (Volkskrone), used in Germany to denote a republic. Berlin's various boroughs use their own emblems.

The bear has been used as a charge in the Berlin coat of arms since 1709, formerly alongside the eagles of Brandenburg and Prussia. A bear occurs on seals, coins and signet rings from as early as the late 12th century (but not as heraldic charge before 1709), presumably due to a canting association with the city's name.

== History ==
The oldest preserved and known seal of Berlin is from 1253. It depicts the Brandenburg Eagle spreading its wings in a clover-shaped archway. The text on the seal is "Sigillum de Berlin Burgensium" (seal of Berlin's citizens). It supposedly was the seal of Berlin's first mayor Marsilius.

A later seal dated to 1280 shows bears as supporters of the Brandenburg coat of arms. The bear appears to have risen in popularity during the 17th century, with an early depiction on a coat of arms in a signet ring dated 1603, and it was adopted as a heraldic charge in 1709. The shield was now divided in three parts, showing the bear below the eagles of Brandenburg and Prussia. Heraldist Adolf Matthias Hildebrandt in 1883 designed a number of proposals for a new coat of arms. One of these was the simplified argent a bear rampant sable with a mural crown in the crest. This was in use as minor coat of arms from 1920, and was adopted as the only coat of arms of West Berlin in 1954, while East Berlin continued to use the design of 1935.

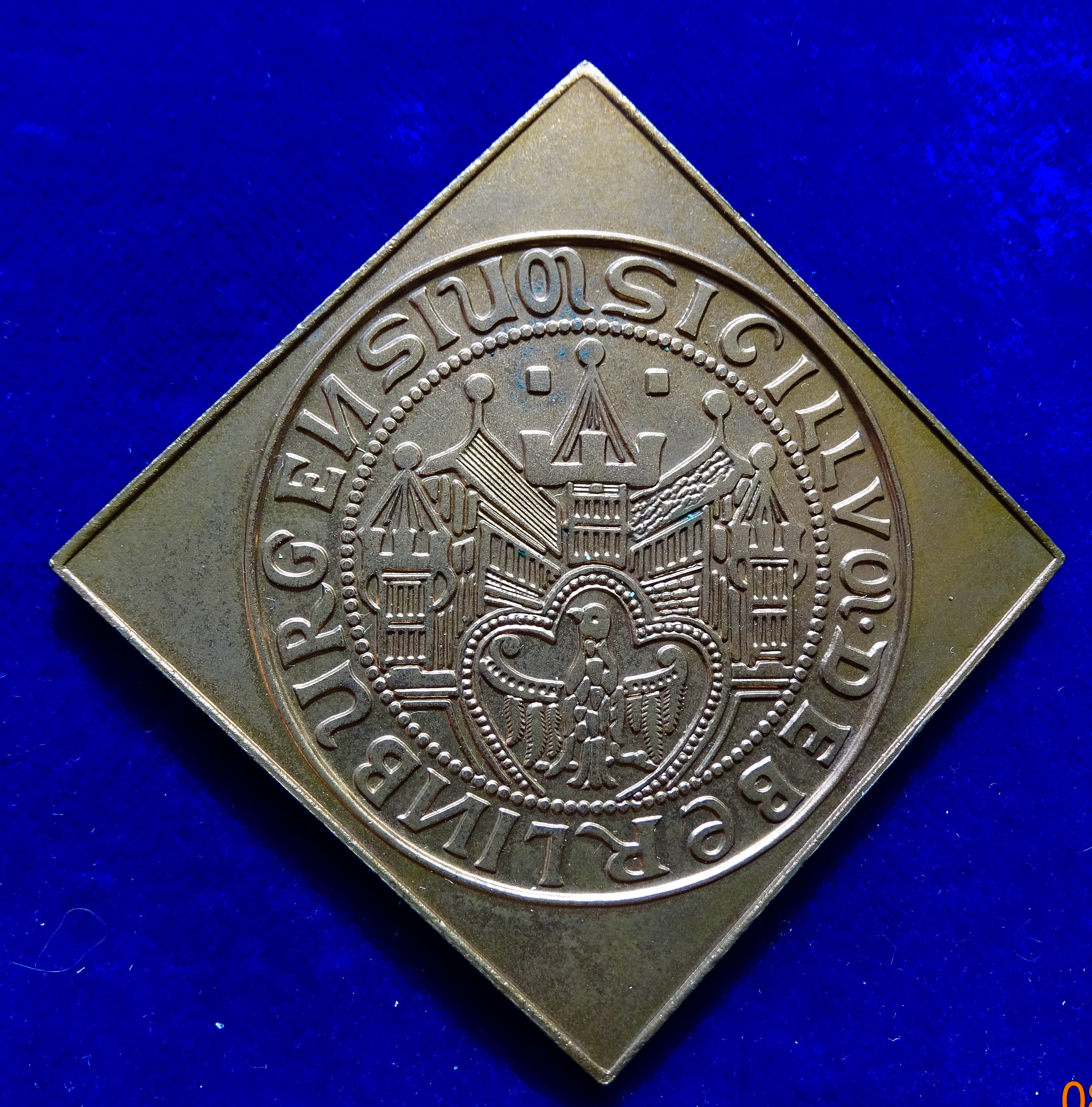
The oldest known Berlin town seal of 1253 copied to the obverse of a Klippe medal by Deutscher Kulturbund, the cultural association of the GDR.

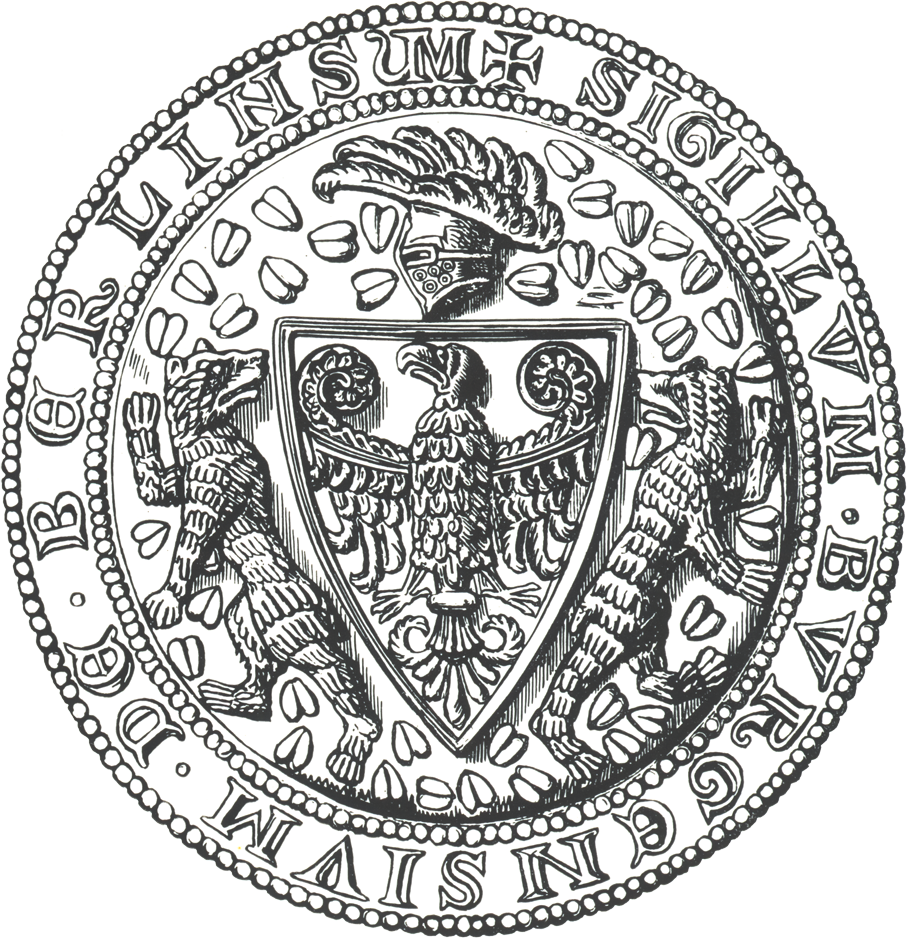
Guild Seal of Berlin, 1280

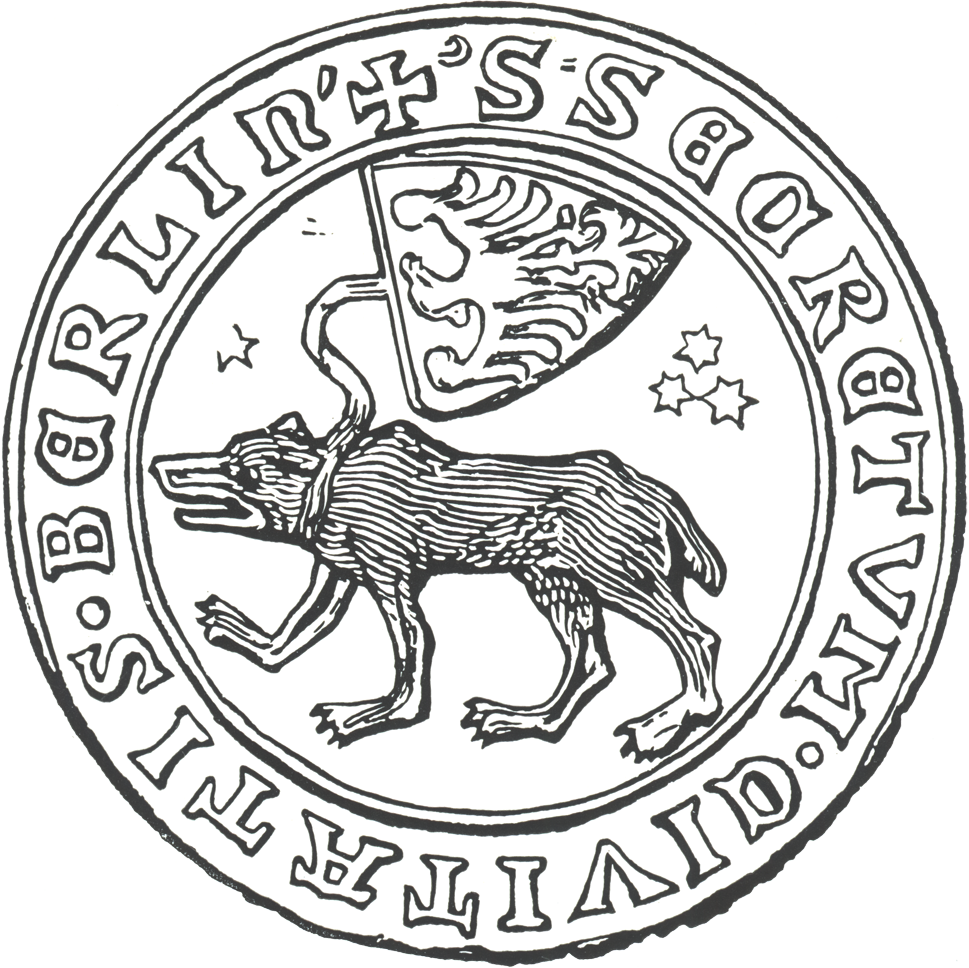
Seal of 1338

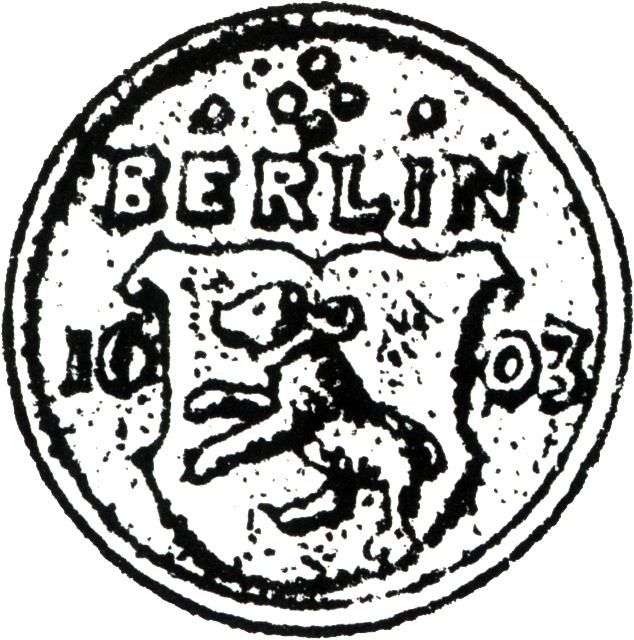
Signet ring of Berlin, 1603

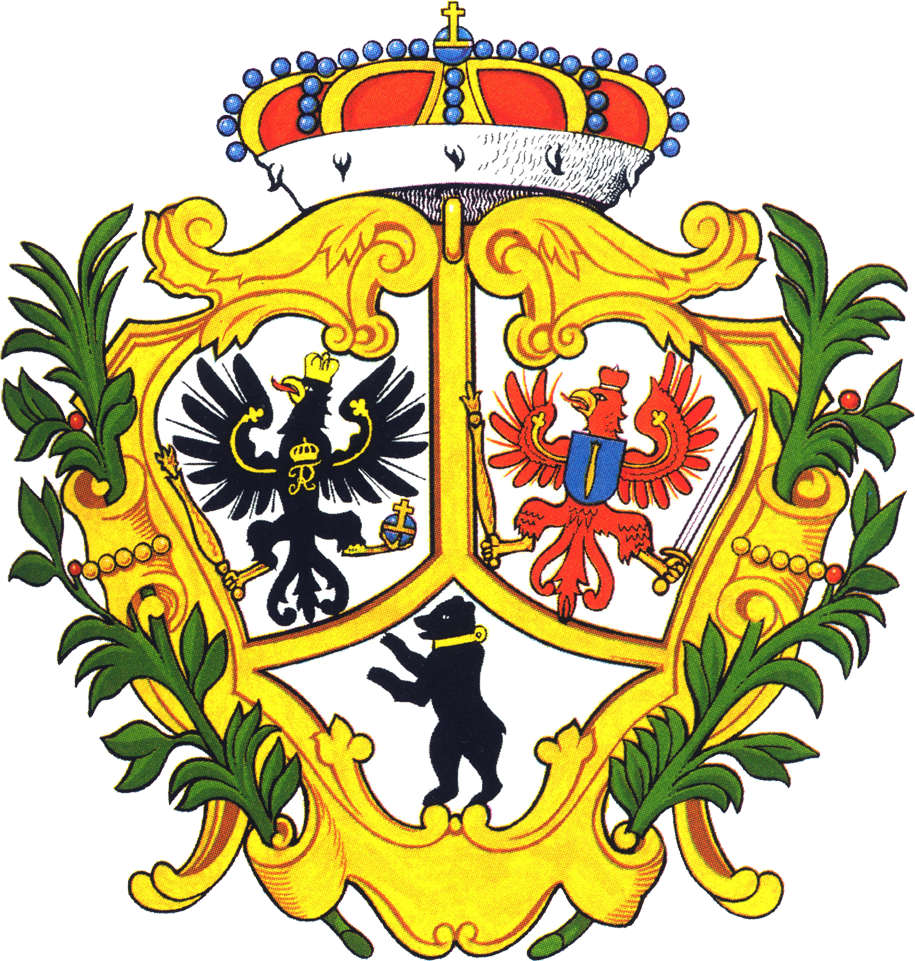
The arms of Berlin, 1709

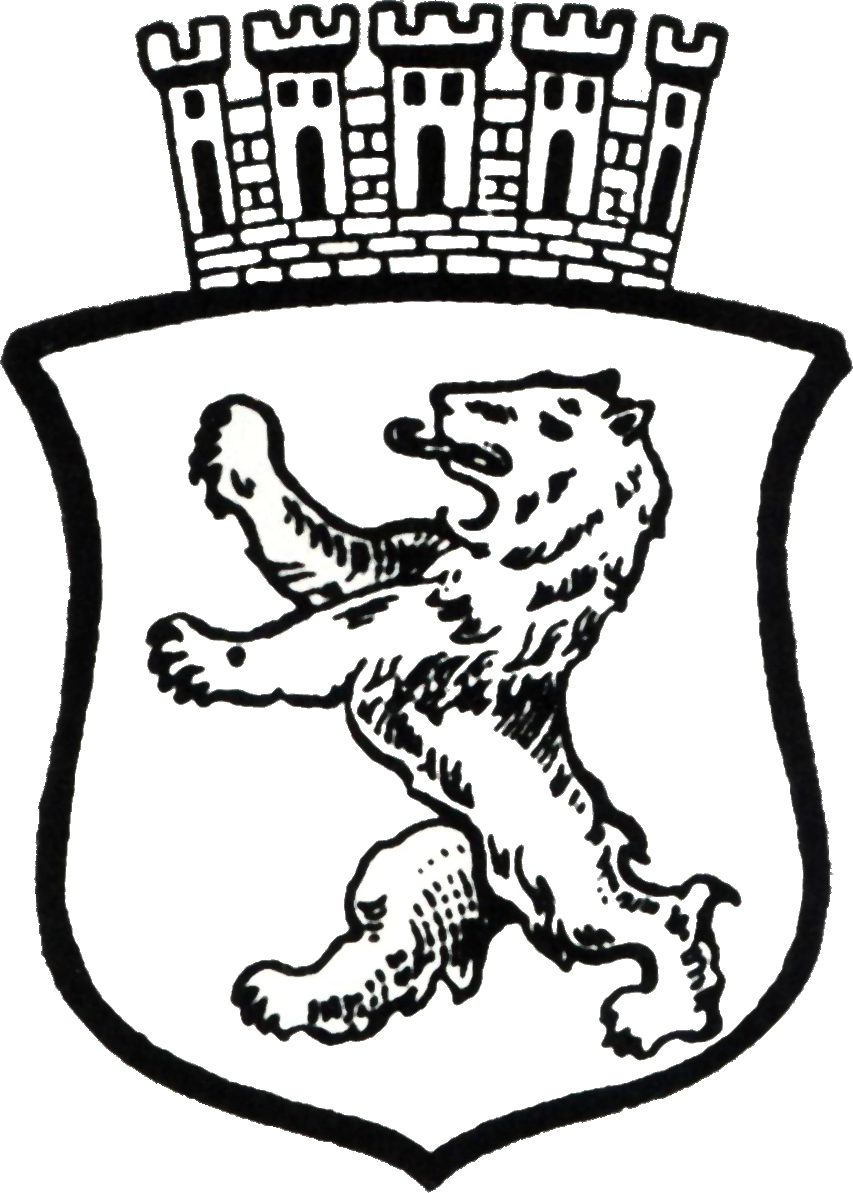
Lesser coat of arms (1883)

Coat of arms of the city of Berlin as rendered by Hugo Gerhard Ströhl, Deutsche Wappenrolle, 1897

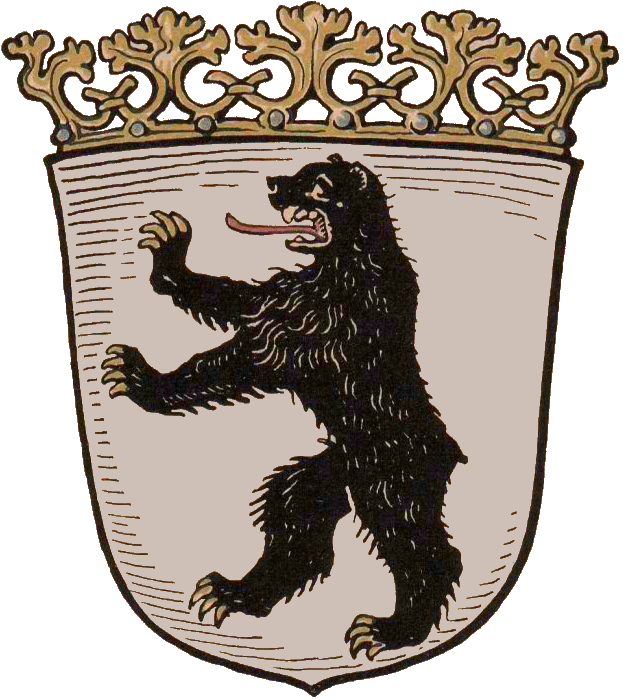
Coat of arms of Greater Berlin 1920–1934

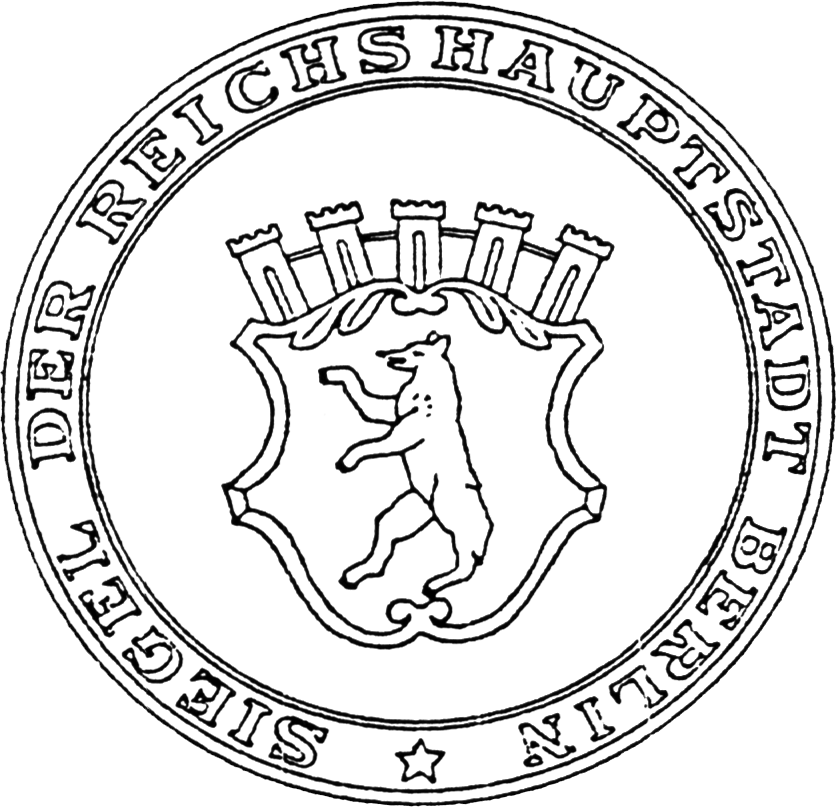
Seal of Berlin as the capital of the Weimar Republic

Coat of arms 1935–1954 and of East Berlin, 1954–1990.

Coat of arms of West Berlin, 1954–1990.

== State logo ==
To enable civilians and non-governmental institutions to express their affinity with Berlin, the Senate of the Interior and Sports provided a logo which features the arms' shield without the crown in black and white or coloured versions.

== Legal status ==
The coat of arms was laid down in a law of 1954:

§ 1 (1) The coat of arms shows on a silver (white) shield, a black bear rampant with tongue and claws in red. On the shield rests a golden five leaved crest coronet, whose tiara of brickwork is provided with a gate in the center. ... § 4 Decisive for the design of the state's coat of arms, the state's flag... are the patterns, added to this law. According to the state's coat of arms, an artistic design is reserved to special purposes.

— Federal Government, Law on the State Symbols of the State of Berlin of 13 May 1954 (GVBl. S. 289)

== Urban symbol ==
The bear has come to be used as the mascot of Berlin, and was used almost excessively by local authorities, so that Hans Brendicke, editor of the journal of the Historical Society of Berlin, in 1896 remarked on the ubiquity of badly designed bears in Berlin. A member of the Historical Society went on to collect a total of 273 different representations of bears in Berlin. Hildebrandt in 1915 again complained about the excesses of variation in the bear, especially deviation from the Prussian tincture of black on white.

The bear has remained the city's mascot, and in 2001 has been developed into the so-called Berlin Buddy Bears, fiberglass sculptures of bears first introduced in 2001, have been used to promote the qualities of "tolerance" and Weltoffenheit (cosmopolitanism) associated with the city.

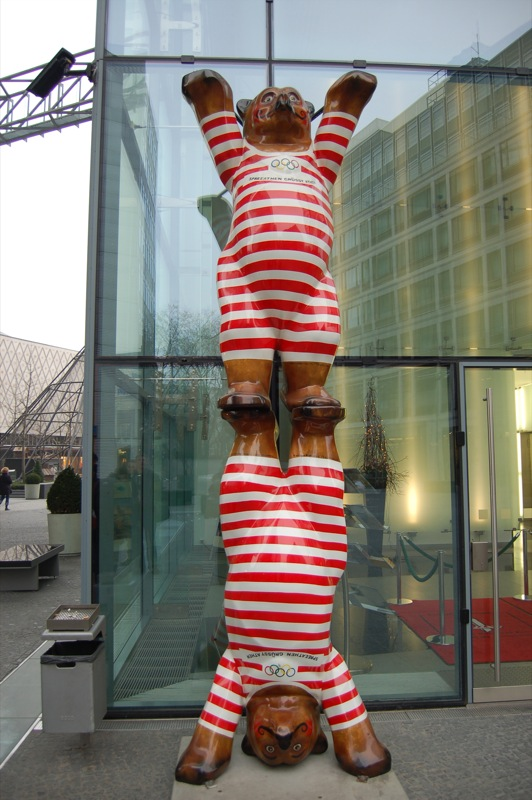
The Berlin Buddy Bear

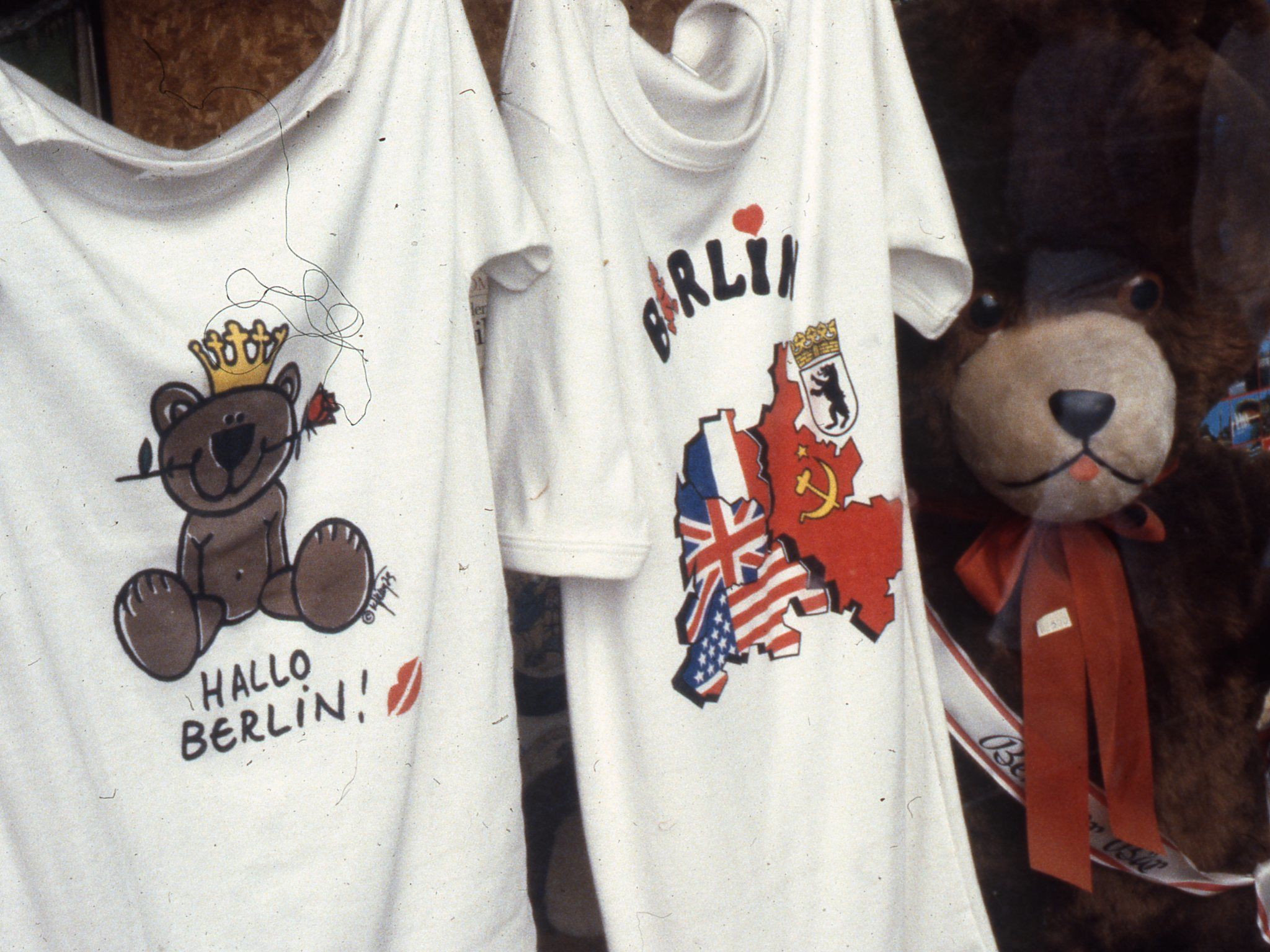
Bear themed T-shirts, from 1984.

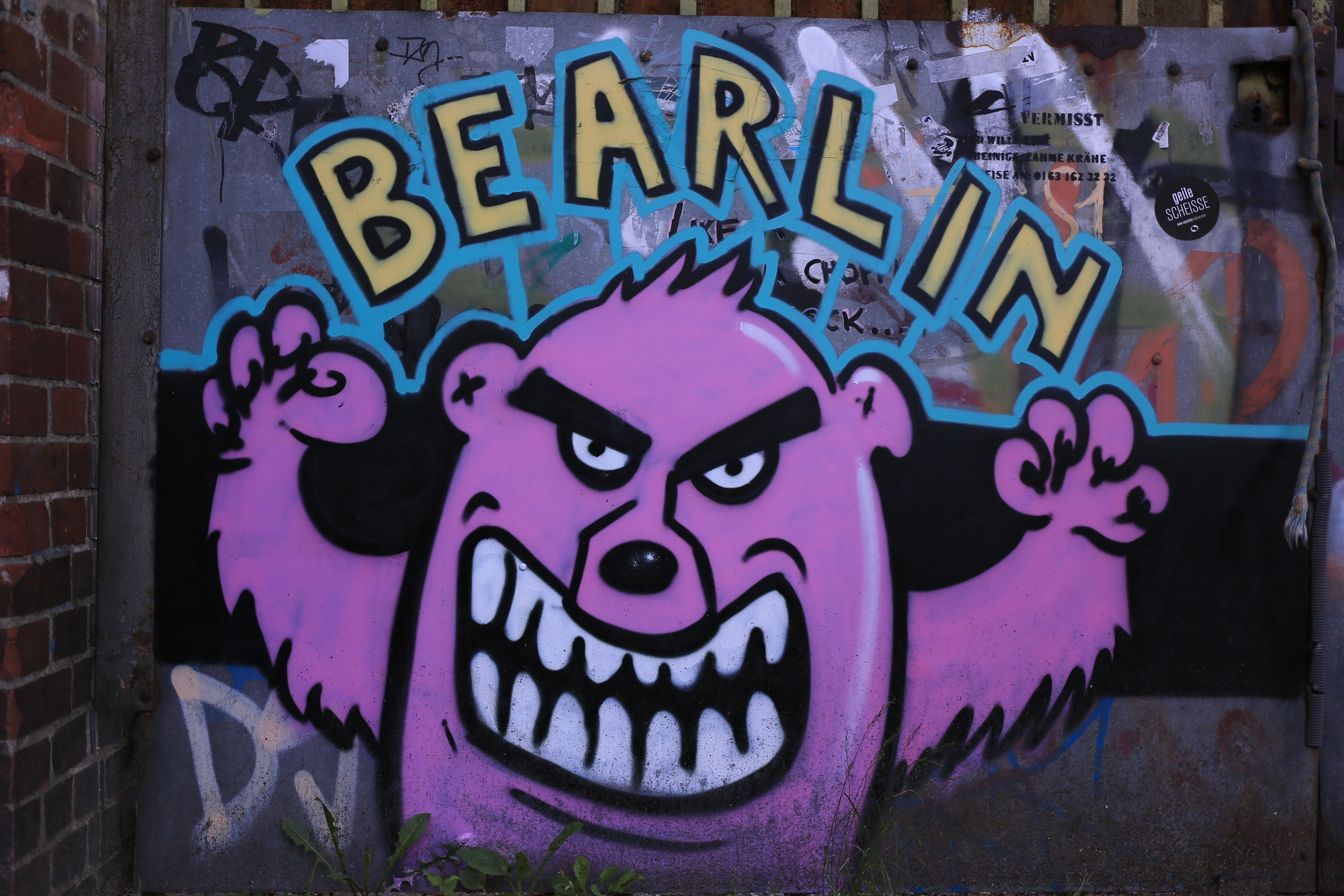
Graffiti in Berlin

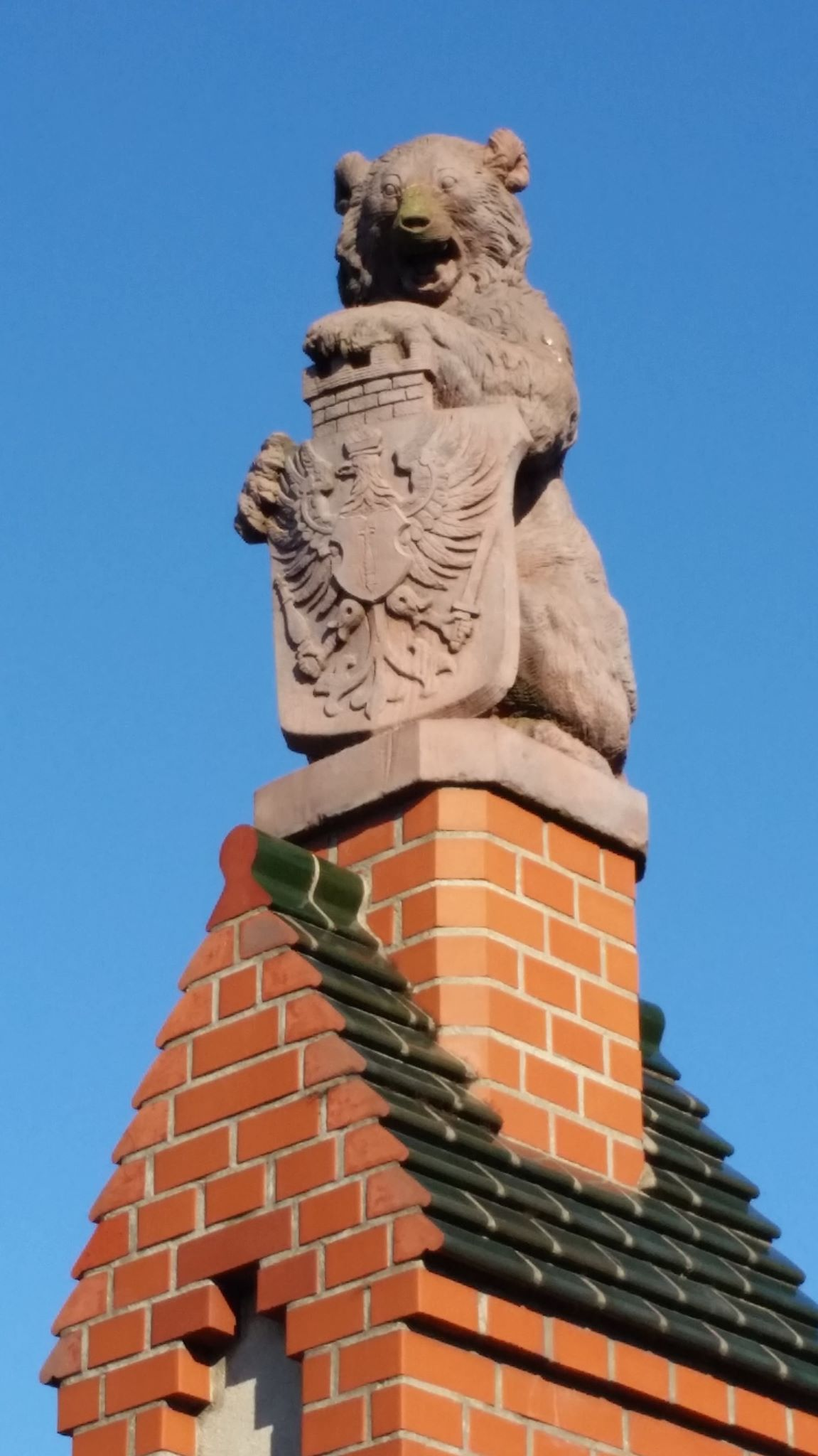
Statue of bear carrying the coat of arms of the Margraviate of Brandenburg, Berlin

== See also ==
- Berlin Bear (disambiguation)
- Berolina, personification of Berlin
- Coat of arms of Bern
- Flag of Berlin
- Origin of the coats of arms of German federal states
