= Berolina =

Female personification of Berlin

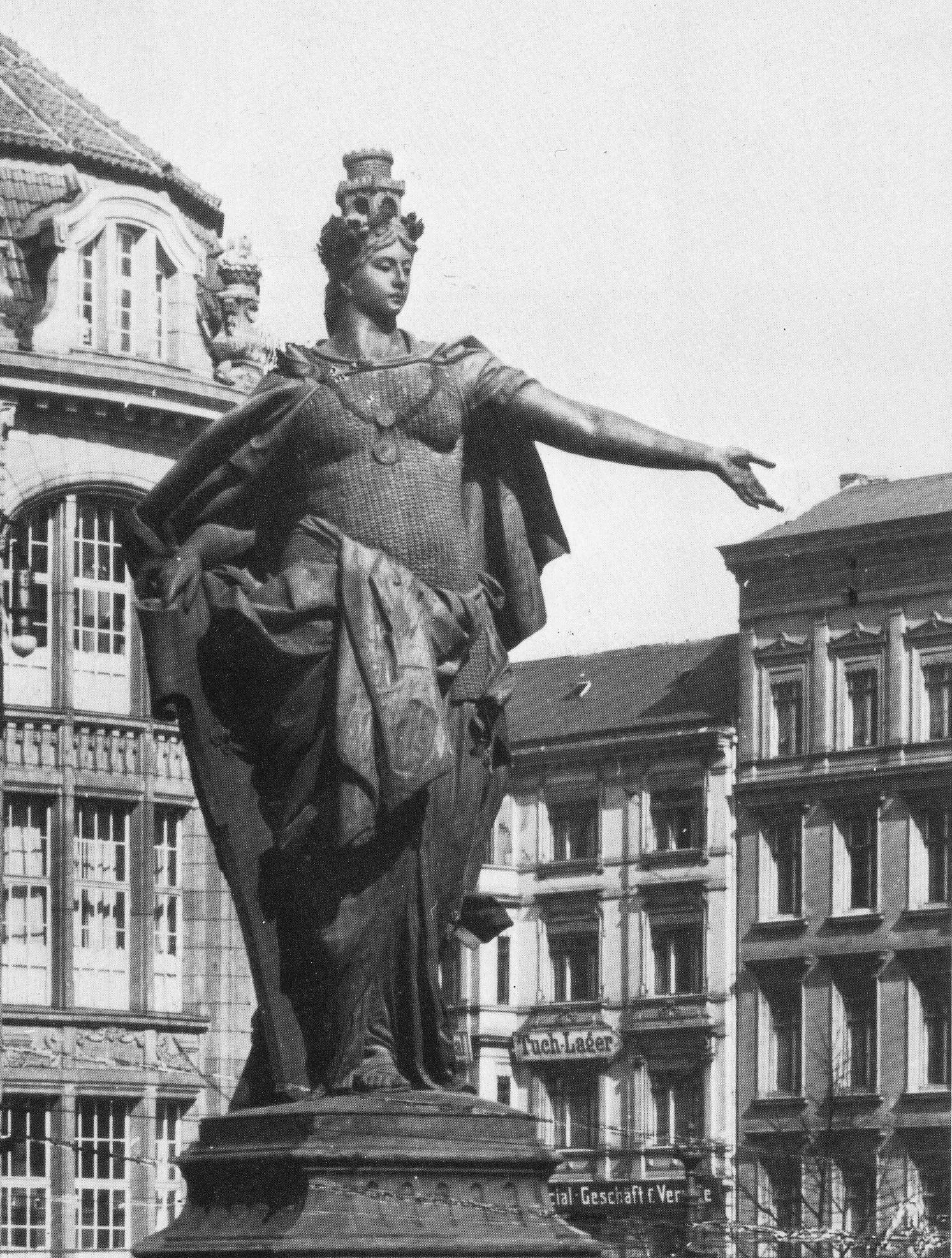
Berolina statue in Alexanderplatz, c. 1900

Berolina is the female personification (Note: The traditional Latin name of Berlin is the neuter Berolinum.) of Berlin and the allegorical female figure symbolizing the city. One of the best-known portraits of Berolina is the statue that once stood in Alexanderplatz.

== Statue ==
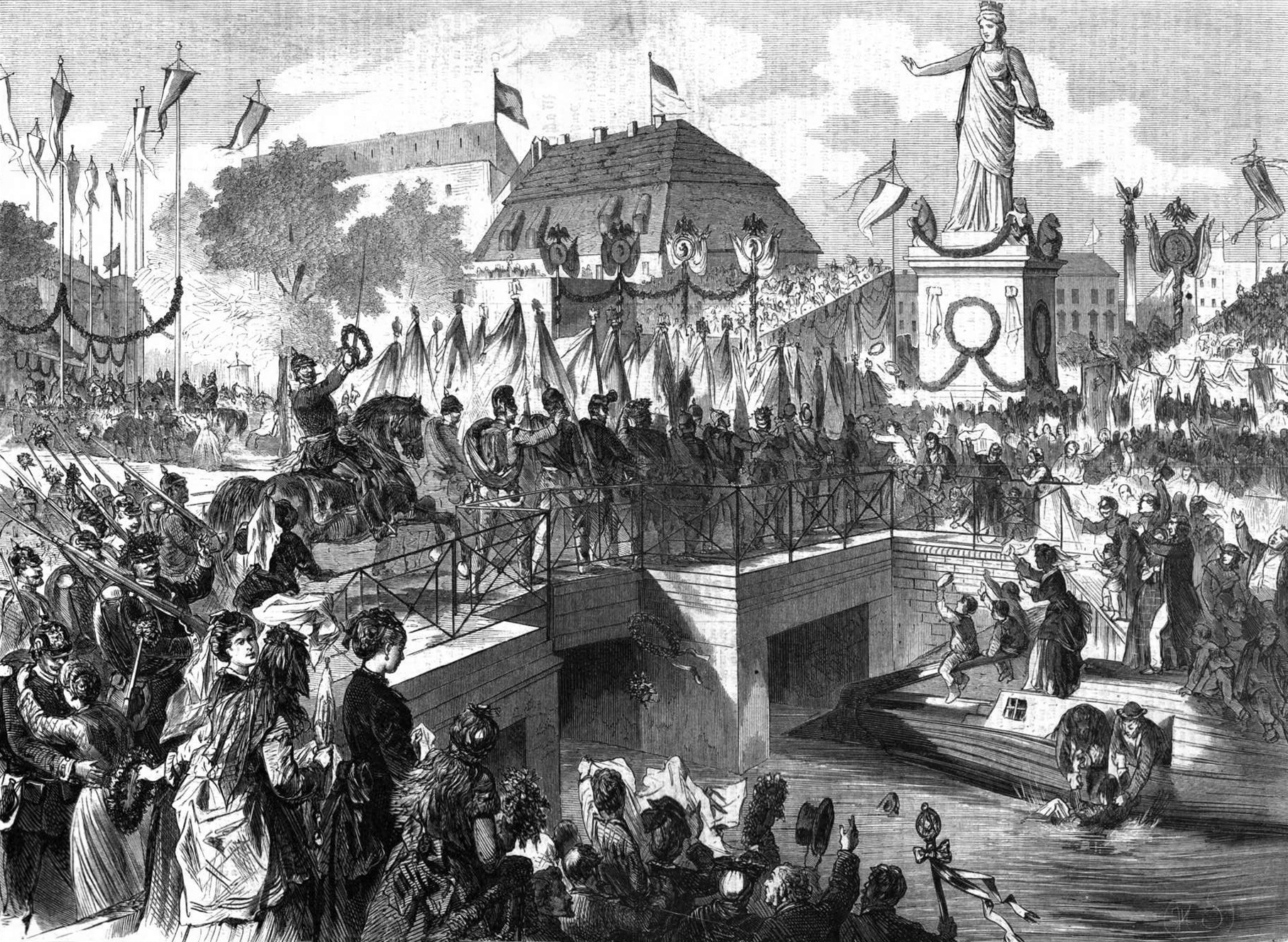
First Berolina statue in Belle-Alliance-Platz, 1871

In 1871, emperor William I ordered an 11 m (36 ft) Berolina statue in Belle-Alliance-Platz (today's Mehringplatz), to glorify the homecoming victorious troops of the Franco-Prussian War.

Another statue was designed in 1889 by the sculptors Emil Hundrieser (1846–1911) and Michel Lock (1848–1898) as a decorative element for the state visit of King Umberto I of Italy. The Berolina figure was produced in plaster and was placed on Potsdamer Platz. The statue of 7.55 m (24.8 ft) showed a woman with a crown of oak leaves. The inspiration allegedly was from a painting in the Rotes Rathaus city hall that featured cobbler's daughter Anna Sasse.

Later, in 1895, the gypsum figure by Hundrieser was copper-melted and unveiled in Alexanderplatz on December 17. Weighing five tonnes, it was placed in front of the site where Hermann Tietz erected his department store in 1904.

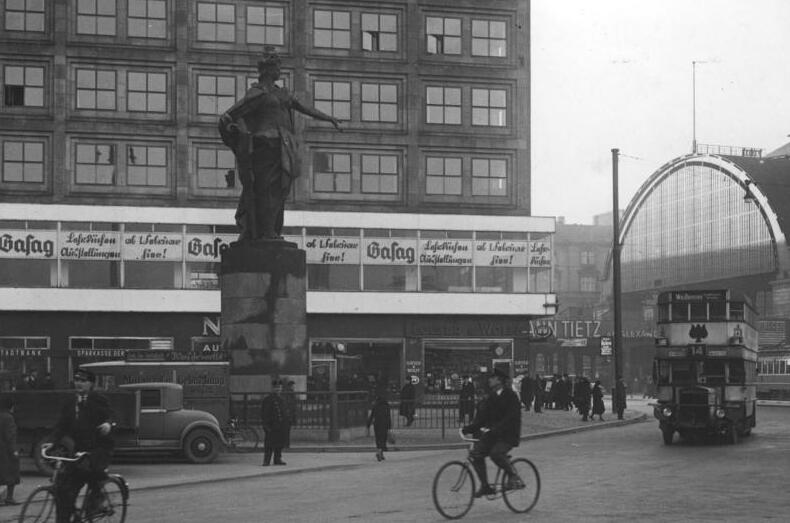
Berolina in 1937, on the right Alexanderplatz station

The statue was damaged in the barricade fights of the German Revolution of 1918–19. It had to be removed during the construction of the U5 underground line in 1927, but was set up again in 1933. The nearby Berolinahaus, built in 1929–32 according to plans by Peter Behrens, was named after the statue. Finally dismantled on 26 August 1942, it was probably melted down in 1944 for war purposes. A model is preserved at the Märkisches Museum.

In 2000, an association named Wiedererstellung und Pflege der Berolina e.V. ('Recreation and Maintenance of Berolina eV') was created with the aim to rebuild the statue.

== Name ==
Many Berliner companies are named "Berolina". A leading German film studio of the 1950s was called Berolina Film. In the past, there were several radio and television broadcasts in which references were made to the city's personification. Today, it is the popular name of central Berlin Police radio. A housing cooperative also bears the Berolina name.

In 1980s, the "Berolina" music awards were organized, sponsored by the TV networks ARD, ZDF and ORF, and hosted on television by Thomas Gottschalk on 27 August 1987 with a total of 15 musicians and bands.

Several songs, poems, and plays are named "Berolina"; as for example, works by Kurt Tucholsky, Günter Neumann, Ulli Herzog, and Alexander von Bentheim.

The Main belt asteroid 422 Berolina, is also named after the city.

== Photogallery ==
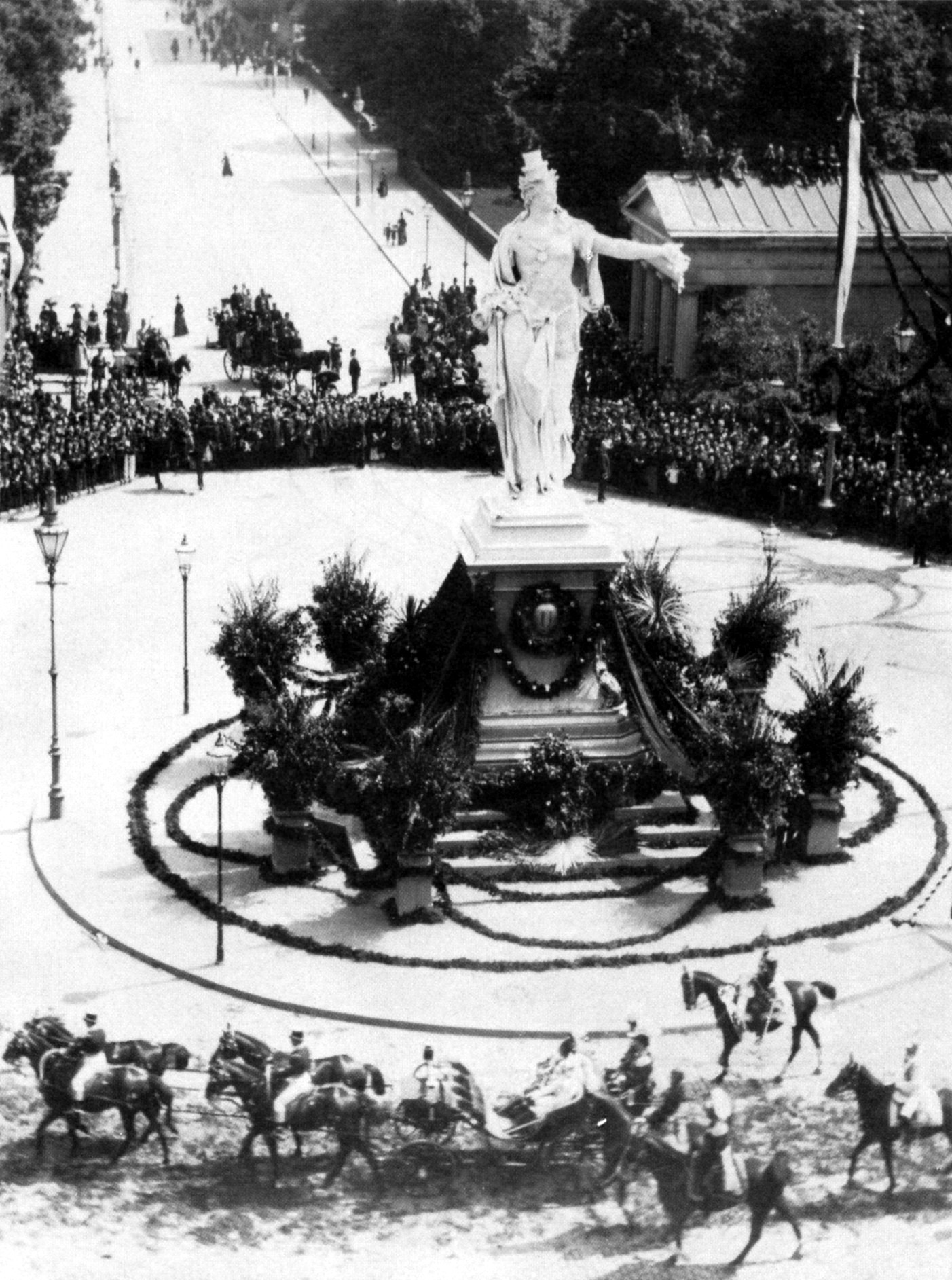
Berolina in Potsdamer Platz, 1889

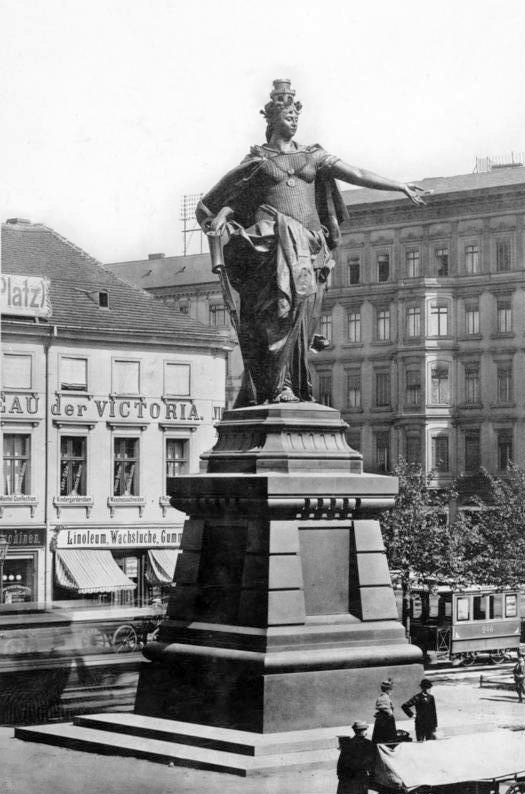
Berolina in Alexanderplatz, 1900

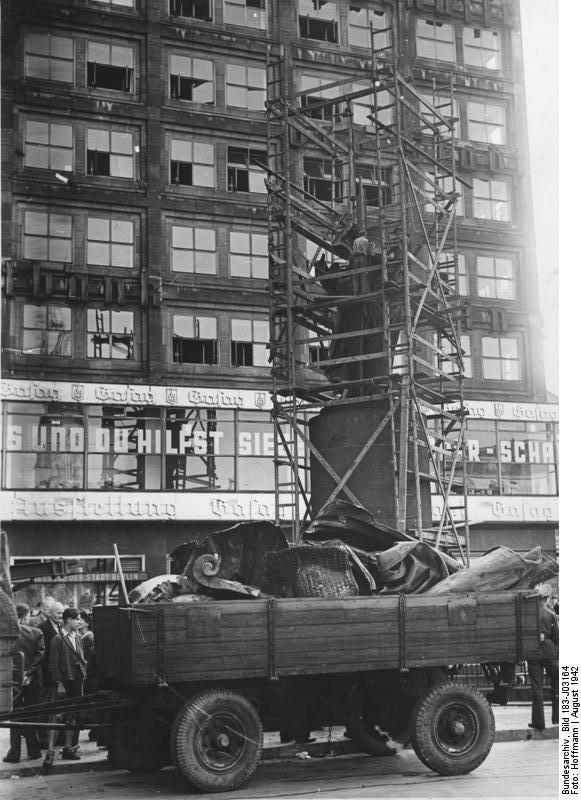
The statue in 1942

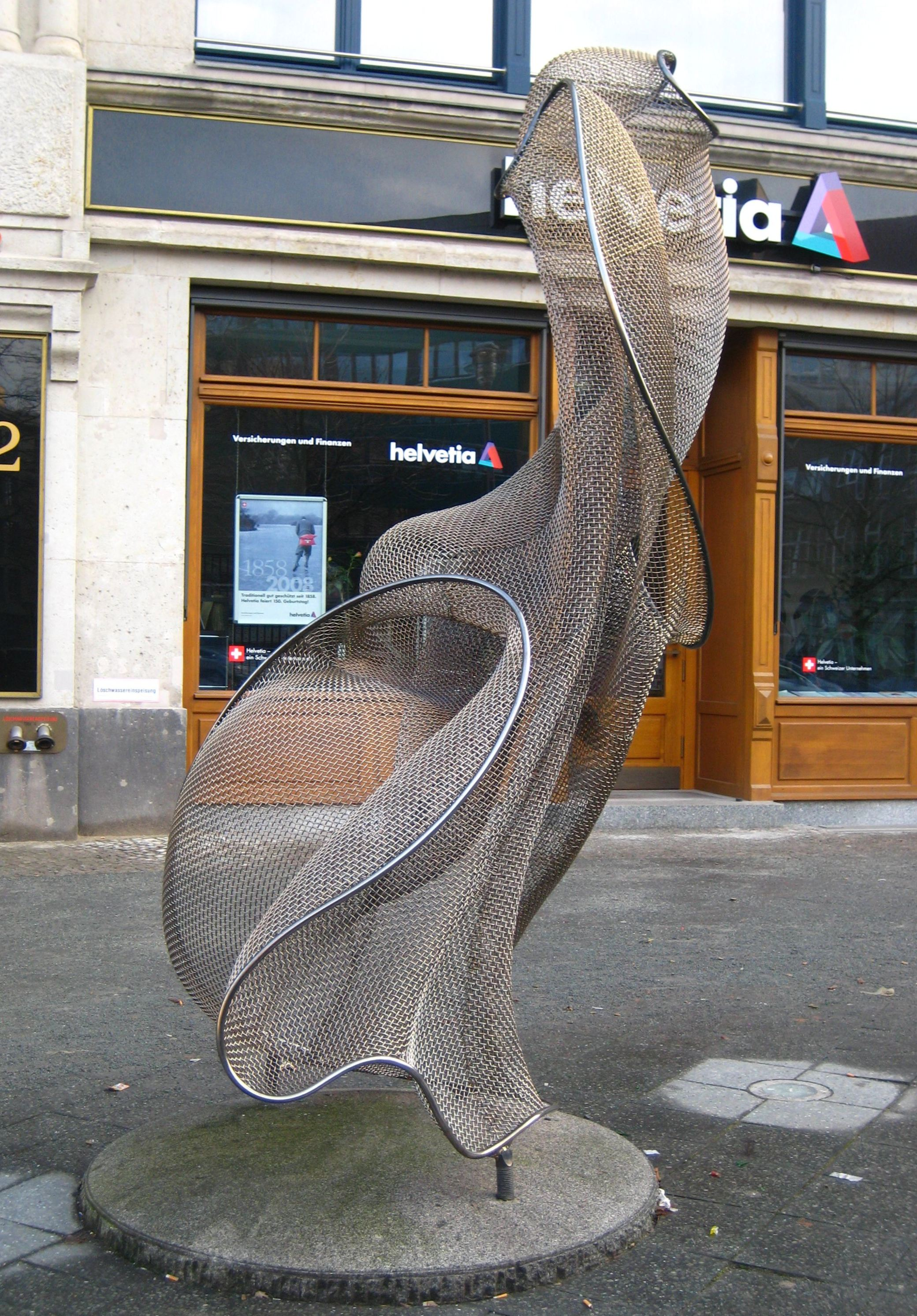
Dancing Berolina, sculpture of Axel Anklam, in Hausvogteiplatz (2004)

== See also ==
- Bavaria, personification of the Land of Bavaria
- Berlino, mascot for the 2009 World Championships in athletics
- Berolina (train), which ran between Warsaw and Berlin
- Deutscher Michel, personification of German people
- Flag and Coat of Arms of Berlin
- Germania, national personification of Germany
- Hammonia, personification of Hamburg
