= Michel Lock =

German sculptor (1848–1898)

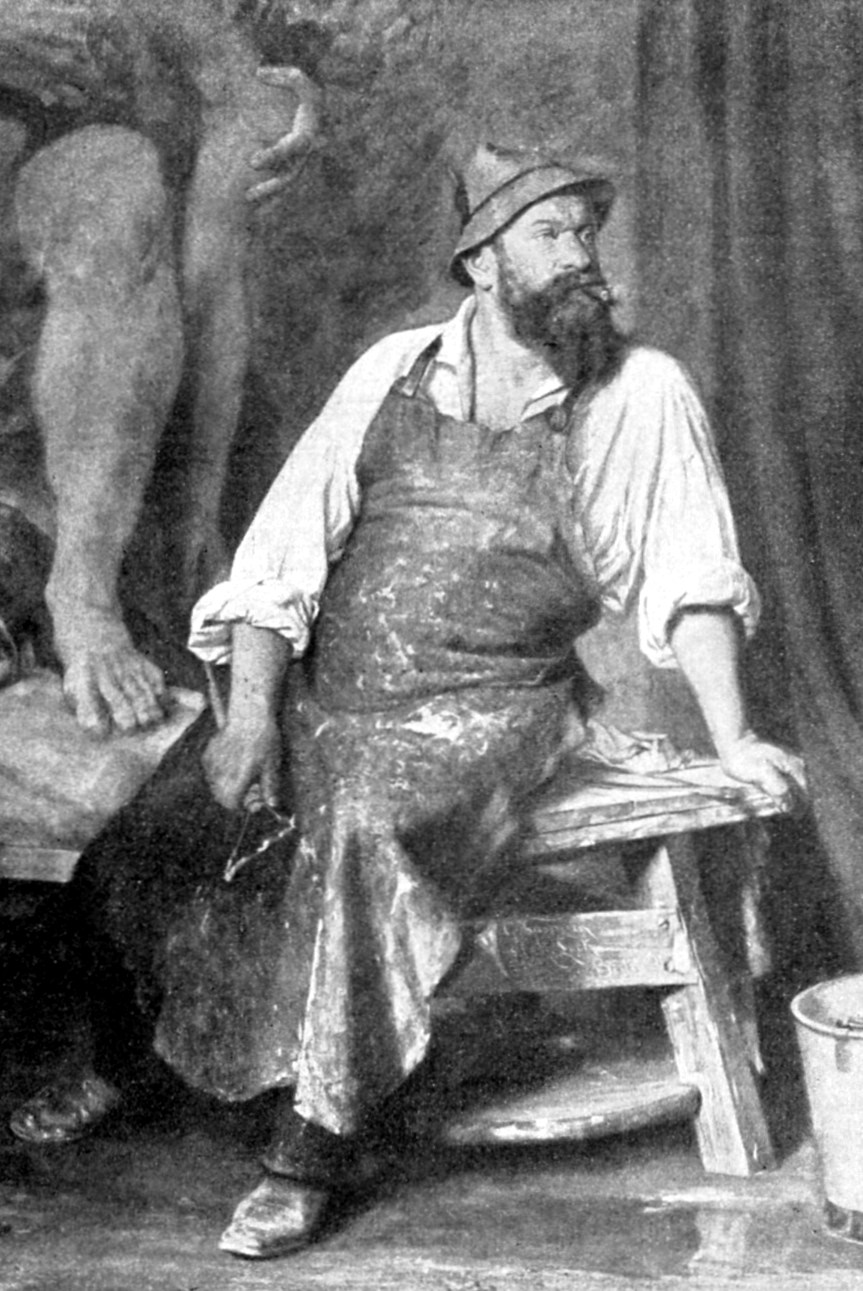
Michel Lock in his studio; portrait by Georg Sassnick

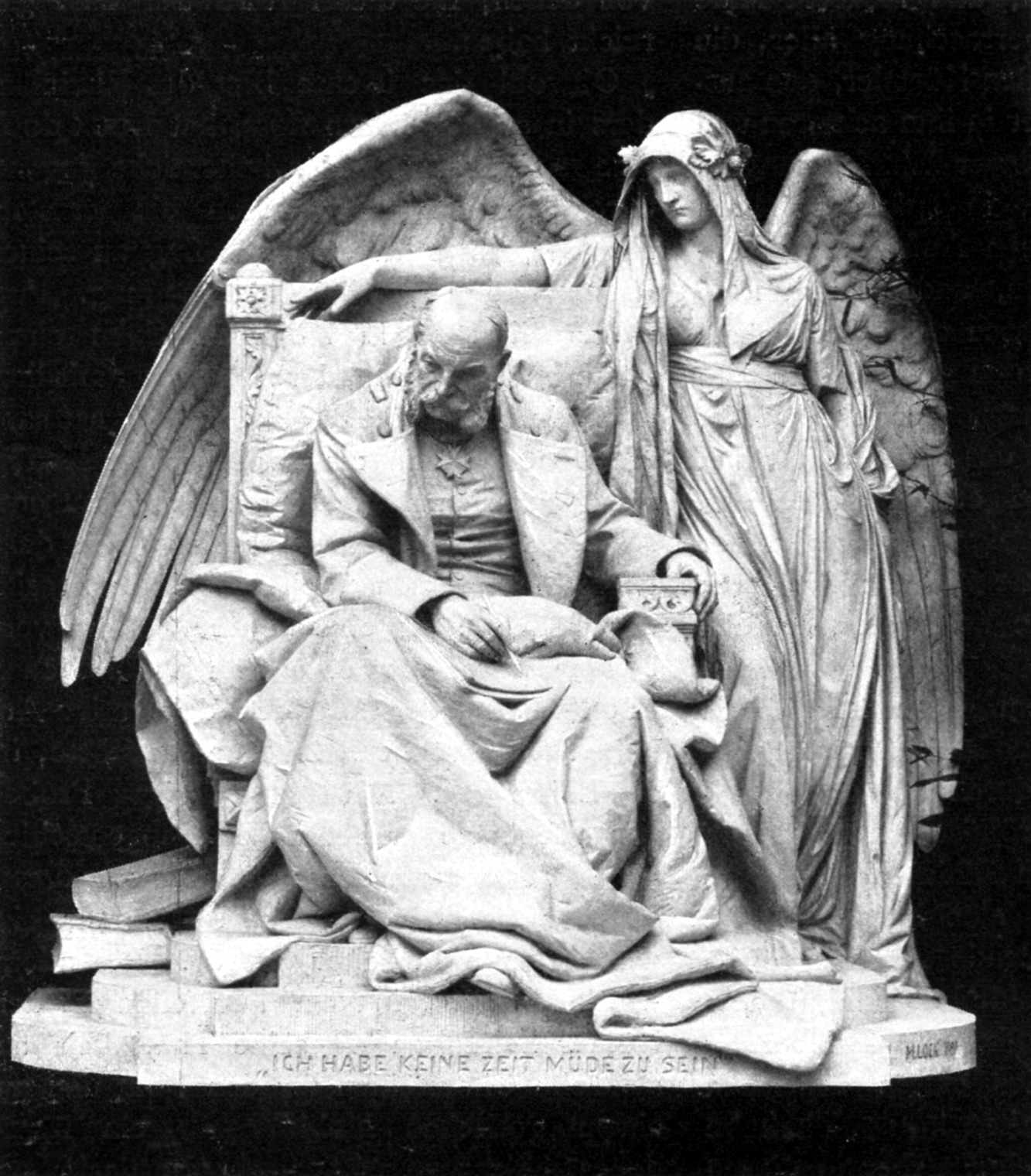
"I have no time to be tired"

Michel Lock, originally Hubert Michael Lock (27 April 1848, Cologne - 20 February 1898, Berlin) was a German sculptor.

== Life and work ==
His father was a merchant. He had sixteen siblings, and began an apprenticeship as a wood carver at the age of twelve. Most of his works were small decorative sculptures for churches. After completing his traditional wanderjahre, he returned to Cologne and worked for the sculptor, Wilhelm Albermann; creating ornamental works for the homes of the wealthy.

In 1866, he relocated to Hannover, and found employment in the workshops of Carl Dopmeyer, where he was allowed to create his first independent works. In 1868, when he was twenty, he accepted an invitation from a plasterer named Rössemann, and went to Berlin. When Rössemann died in 1871, Lock was hired by the firm of "Zeyer & Drechsler", as a supervisor for their forty assistants. He had a falling out with them three years later, and decided to take a study trip to Italy.

When he returned, he went back to Berlin, doing modelling and stonework for the new Nationalgalerie. He was permitted to use the workshop in his spare time, so he had another opportunity to create independent works. By 1877, he was able to establish his own studio; taking commissions for work on public and private buildings. In 1884, his statue of Daedalus, holding Icarus in his arms, received a gold medal at an exhibition in Brussels. He was awarded two more gold medals, in 1890 and 1896; both at the Große Berliner Kunstausstellung. Some of his larger works were done in collaboration with Emil Hundrieser; notably a figure of Berolina, created for a state visit by King Umberto I of Italy.

His most familiar work is "Ich habe keine Zeit müde zu sein" (I have no time to be tired, 1891), which depicts Kaiser Wilhelm I, in his armchair, with the Angel of Death by his side. The title is taken from one of Wilhelm's favorite sayings. After Lock's death, a full-sized marble copy was created by Franz Tübbecke (1856–1937) and displayed at the Hohenzollern Museum in Monbijou Palace. It was lost when the palace was destroyed in World War II.
