= Paradise Township, York County, Pennsylvania =

Township in Pennsylvania, US

Coordinates: 39°52′20″N 76°57′29″W

- Township
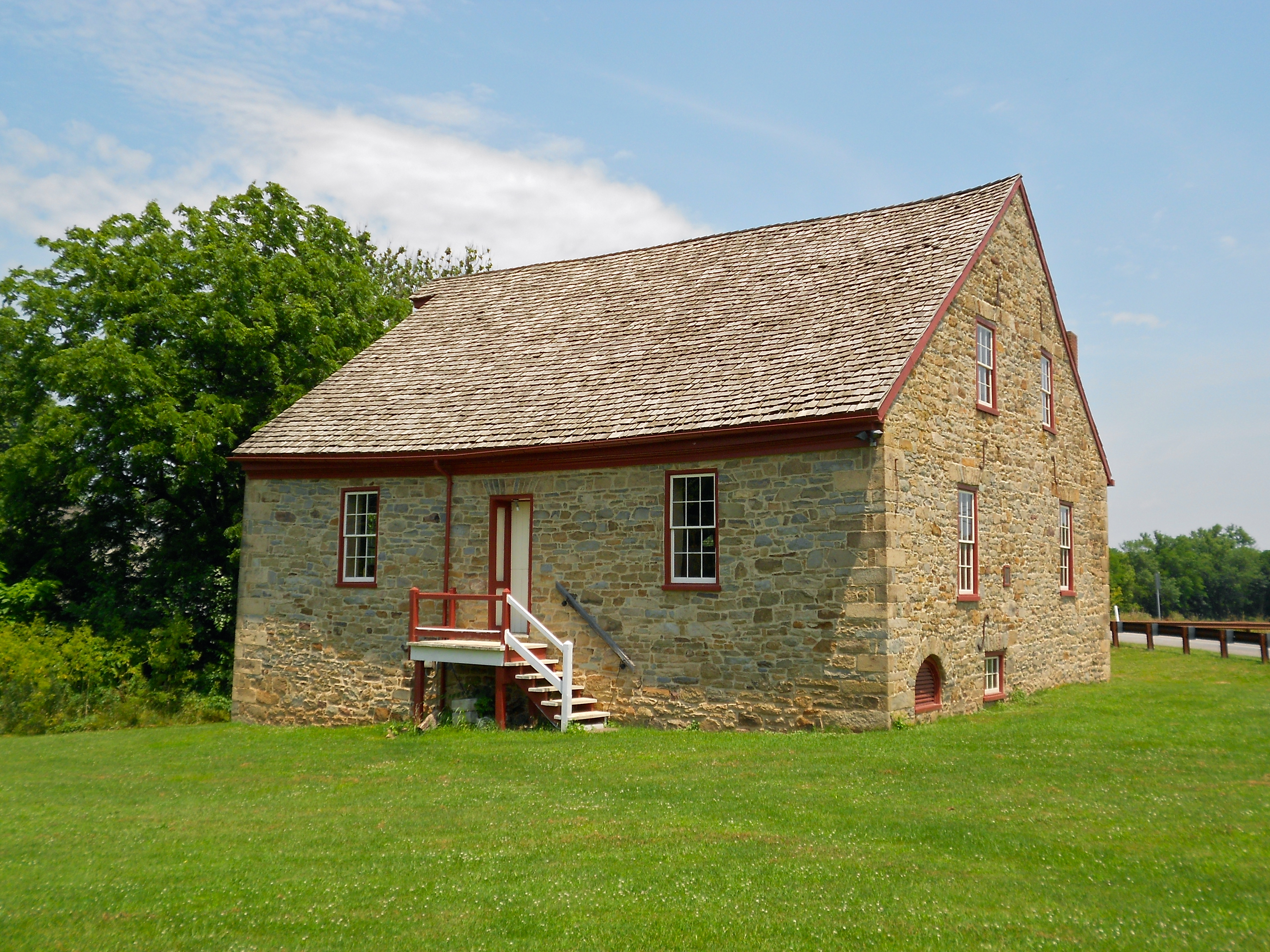
- Swigart's Mill, built 1794

- Location in York County and the state of Pennsylvania.
- Country: United States
- State: Pennsylvania
- County: York
- Settled: 1738
- Incorporated: 1747

Government
  - Type: Board of Supervisors

Area
  - Total: 20.25 sq mi (52.45 km^{2})
  - Land: 20.25 sq mi (52.44 km^{2})
  - Water: 0.0077 sq mi (0.02 km^{2})

Population (2020)
  - Total: 3,970 ▲
  - Estimate (2023): 4,016
  - Density: 193.2/sq mi (74.61/km^{2})
- Time zone: UTC-5 (Eastern (EST))
  - Summer (DST): UTC-4 (EDT)
- Area code: 717
- FIPS code: 42-133-57872
- Website: https://www.paradisetwpyorkco.com/

Historical population
Census	Pop.	Note	%±
1930	1,164		—
1940	1,212		4.1%
1950	1,476		21.8%
1960	1,778		20.5%
1970	2,165		21.8%
1980	2,715		25.4%
1990	3,180		17.1%
2000	3,600		13.2%
2010	3,766		4.6%
2020	3,970		5.4%
2023 (est.)	4,016		1.2%
U.S. Decennial Census

Paradise Township is a settlement in York County, Pennsylvania, United States. As of the 2020 census, the township population was 3,970.

== History ==
The Swigart's Mill was added to the National Register of Historic Places in 1980.

== Geography ==
According to the United States Census Bureau, the township has a total area of 20.2 square miles (52.2 km^{2}), all land.

== Demographics ==
At the 2000 census there were 3,600 people, 1,313 households, and 1,042 families living in the township. The population density was 178.6 inhabitants per square mile (69.0/km^{2}). There were 1,359 housing units at an average density of 67.4 per square mile (26.0/km^{2}). The racial makeup of the township was 98.28% White, 0.50% African American, 0.08% Native American, 0.42% Asian, 0.03% Pacific Islander, 0.33% from other races, and 0.36% from two or more races. Hispanic or Latino of any race were 0.61%.

Of the 1,313 households 34.6% had children under the age of 18 living with them, 69.8% were married couples living together, 5.7% had a female householder with no husband present, and 20.6% were non-families. 16.2% of households were one person and 6.1% were one person aged 65 or older. The average household size was 2.71 and the average family size was 3.04.

The age distribution was 26.0% under the age of 18, 5.9% from 18 to 24, 31.3% from 25 to 44, 26.3% from 45 to 64, and 10.6% 65 or older. The median age was 38 years. For every 100 females there were 106.5 males. For every 100 females age 18 and over, there were 102.9 males.

The median household income was $48,517 and the median family income was $51,914. Males had a median income of $36,537 versus $25,023 for females. The per capita income for the township was $19,389. About 3.8% of families and 4.3% of the population were below the poverty line, including 3.9% of those underage 18 and 8.8% of those age 65 or over.
