= Klippe (coin) =

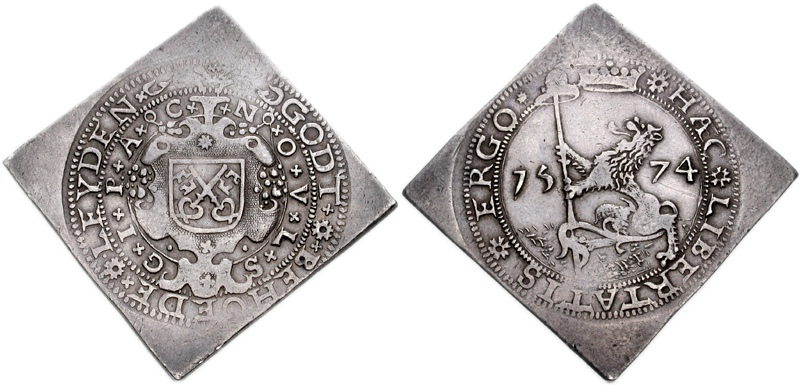

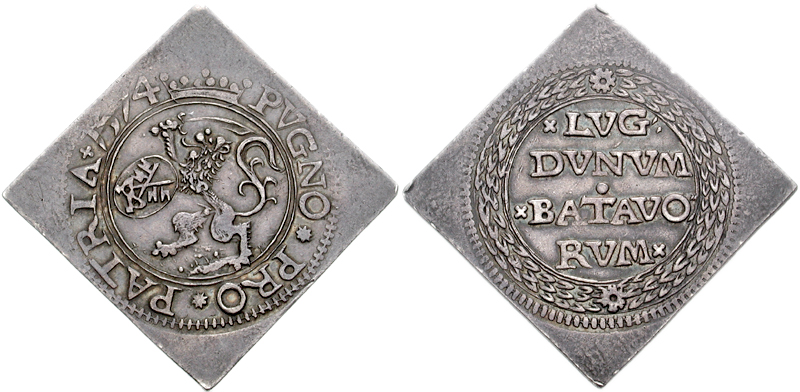

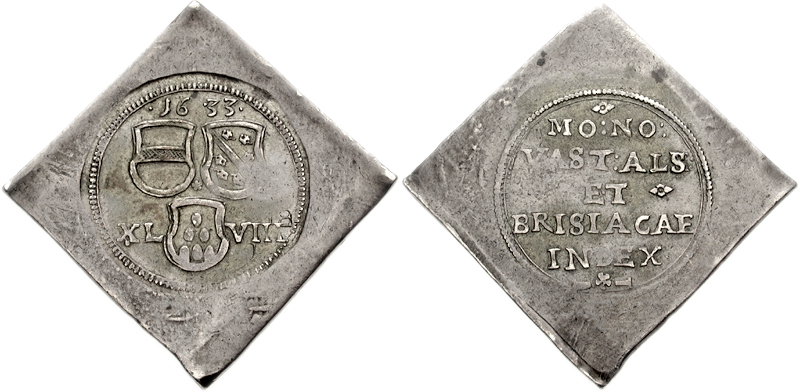

A klippe is a square coin minted on more easily produced square flans either using round or square dies. These coins were originally issued under unfavourable conditions, such as a city under siege. Such emergency coins were issued in Vienna in 1529, while the city was besieged by the troops of the Ottoman Empire. However, by the seventeenth century, klippe were also commonly produced as presentation pieces, and medals. As well, some klippe coins were made as a regular strikes, such as the many variations of the city of Salzburg in Austria, where klippe coins were made in silver and gold for many centuries.
